= Battle for the Donbas (1919) =

Military campaign of the Russian Civil War

Coordinates: 48°N 37.8°E

Battle for Donbas
- Part of the Southern Front of the Russian Civil War
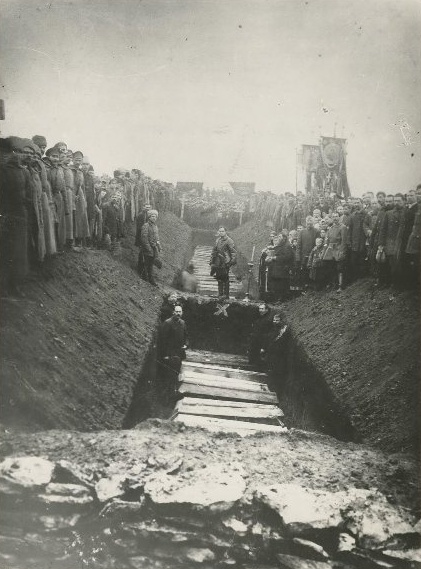
- Burial of miners massacred by the Volunteer Army
Date	12 January – 31 May 1919 (4 months, 2 weeks and 5 days)
Location	Donbas
Result	Russian White victory

Belligerents
South Russia; Don Republic; Kuban Republic	Russian SFSR; Ukrainian SSR; Makhnovshchina

Commanders and leaders
Anton Denikin; Vladimir May-Mayevsky; Andrei Shkuro; Viktor Pokrovsky; Pyotr Krasnov	Jukums Vācietis; Vladimir Gittis; Innokentiy Kozhevnikov; Tichon Hvesin; Pavel Knyagnitsky; Anatoly Skachko; Nestor Makhno

Units involved
Armed Forces of South Russia: Don Army; Volunteer Army; 1st Kuban Cossack Division; 1st Terek Cossack Division	Southern Front: 8th Army; 9th Army; Ukrainian Front: 2nd Ukrainian Soviet Army; 13th Army

Strength
26,000	40,000–50,000

Casualties and losses
Heavy	Heavy

The Battle for Donbas was a military campaign of the Russian Civil War that lasted from January to May 1919, in which White forces repulsed attacks of the Red Army on the Don Host Oblast and occupied the Donbas region after heavy fighting.

After the army of the Ukrainian People's Republic was pushed out of Kharkiv and Kyiv and the Ukrainian Socialist Soviet Republic was established, in March 1919 the Red Army attacked the central part of Donbas, which had been abandoned by the Imperial German Army in November 1918 and subsequently occupied by the White Volunteer Army. Its aim was to control strategically located and economically important territories, which would enable a further advance towards Crimea, the Sea of Azov and the Black Sea. After heavy fights, fought with variable luck, the Red Army took over key centers in this area (Yuzivka, Luhansk, Debaltseve, Mariupol) until the end of March, when it lost them to the Whites led by Vladimir May-Mayevsky.

On April 20, the front stretched along the Dmitrovsk-Horlivka line, and the Whites actually had an open road towards Kharkiv, the capital of the Ukrainian SSR. Until 4 May, their attacks were resisted by Luhansk. Further successes of the Armed Forces of South Russia in May 1919 were favored by the conflict of the Reds with the anarchists of Nestor Makhno (who were still their allies in March) and the rebellion of the Bolshevik ally, Otaman Nykyfor Hryhoriv.

The battle for Donbas ended at the beginning of June 1919 with a complete victory for the Whites, who continued their offensive towards Kharkiv, Katerynoslav, and then Crimea, Mykolaiv and Odesa.

== Background ==
In November and December 1918, part of Donbas was seized by Don Cossacks under the command of Pyotr Krasnov, after the withdrawal of the Imperial German Army and with the consent of the Ukrainian hetman Pavlo Skoropadskyi. On 19 November 1918, Krasnov entered Luhansk, and at the beginning of December his troops took Mariupol, Yuzivka and Debaltseve. He also organized the administration of the Don Republic in Luhansk and Slavo-Serbia.

At this time, the Red Army prepared their own offensive into Ukraine, which began in the first days of January 1919 with the capture of Kharkiv. By the end of the month, Soviet troops, joined by local partisan units that had previously participated in the uprising against the Hetmanate, and armed workers' detachments from the cities, took over Poltava and Katerynoslav. It became clear to the command of the Volunteer Army that Krasnov's Cossacks would not be able to stay in Donbas or stop the Red march southwards towards the Black Sea, especially after Krasnov had once again concentrated most of his forces around Tsaritsyn and made a third unsuccessful attempt to capture the city. This posed a threat to the White-controlled Taganrog and Rostov-on-Don. For the White movement, the loss of Donbas would also mean the loss of highly industrialized areas of great economic importance. Therefore, in December 1918, Anton Denikin gave up his plans to join the siege of Tsaritsyn and to lead a further offensive up the Volga in order to cut off the Reds from the Caspian Sea and take Astrakhan from them, and consequently to join his own forces with those of Alexander Kolchak in the middle Volga. Instead, he started shifting forces to the defense of Donbas and Crimea. By the end of March, Denikin transferred 18,000 soldiers to the areas north and west of Rostov-on-Don.

The defeats of the Don Cossacks forced them to submit to the command of the Volunteer Army. On 19 February 1919, Krasnov handed his command over to Afrikan Bogaewsky and agreed that the Don Cossacks, together with the Volunteer Army, Terek Cossacks, and Kuban Cossacks, were to be included in the Armed Forces of South Russia.

== Battle ==
The 8th Army (part of the Southern Front) and an independent group of troops under the command of Innokentiy Kozhevnikov, later transformed into 13th Army (part of the Ukrainian Front), composed of the 3rd and 4th Ukrainian insurgent divisions, then reorganized as the 41st and 42nd Rifle Divisions. Kozhevnikov's forces were deployed along the Hundorovska-Mityakinskaya-Luhansk line, further north of Debaltseve, south of Bakhmut and south towards the railway station Volnovakha. The section between Volnovakha and the quay of the Sea of Azov was supported by anarchist units of Nestor Makhno, as the 3rd Brigade of the 1st Zadneprovsk Ukrainian Soviet Division of the 2nd Ukrainian Soviet Army.

=== Red offensive (March–April) ===
In March, Kozhevnikov's group made the first attempt to oust the Whites from Donbas. The Red Army struck the central part of Donbas with Mykitivka, Yenakiieve, Yuzivka, Bakhmut and Luhansk. Particularly fierce fighting took place in the area of Debaltseve, a key railway junction that the Red Army took over on 16 March. Due to the lack of progress of Kozhevnikov's troops, the commander of the Southern Front Vladimir Gittis shifted part of the 8th Army to the west as support, against the intentions of the commander-in-chief of the Red Army Jukums Vācietis. However, the transfer of troops was stopped in the last days of March due to spring thaws and damage to the railway network. On 28 March, troops of the 13th Army entered Yenakiieve, Mykitivka, Makiivka and Horlivka, and on 3 April they seized Yuzivka, Yasynuvata and Starobesheve. On 1 April, the Dnieper Division under the command of Pavel Dybenko captured Mariupol and pushed as far as to be within of 30–40 km from Taganrog. However, on 6 and 7 April, White cavalry divisions under the command of Andrei Shkuro and Vladimir May-Mayevsky broke the defense of the Reds in the central part of Donbas and again took control of Yuzivka, Volnovakha, Mariupol, Makiivka, Yasynuvata, Yenakiieve and Horlivka. Volnovakha was recaptured by the Red Army after another bloody battle on 24 April, two days later the Reds again controlled Mariupol, and on 28 April, they also captured Yuzivka. In the cities occupied by the Bolsheviks, councils and executive committees were formed, and regional congresses of councils were held.

From March 19 to 27, the forces of Soviet Ukraine and Makhnovshchina led by Nestor Makhno fought with the Donetsk units of the Volunteer Army led by Mikhailo Vinohradov in Mariupol. On March 19, the first offensive of the Dnieper Division took place, during which Nestor Makhno's troops forced the Volunteer Army to flee to the city after a long firefight and spreading panic amongst the Volunteer Army troops. On March 21, after receiving an order for the brigade to advance east, Makhno reasoned he could not immediately take Mariupol and retreated from it. His troops were subsequently redeployed and the city was occupied by the 8th and 9th Regiments. Despite being surrounded on three sides by Makhno's forces, the city's capture was complicated by the presence of Entente warships. The second offensive which began on March 25 and lasted until March 27 completed the capture of the city. Makhnovist guerrillas were welcomed as they entered the city and subsequently a committee was formed for the underground military-revolutionary Bolshevik Communist Party as well as a commissariat for the Soviet People's Militia.

Following the defeat of the Volunteer Army, 1st Zadneprovsk Ukrainian Soviet Division head Pavel Dybenko telegraphed the USSR Soviet People's Commissar from Mariupol on the battles' outcomes. In his telegraph, he praised the Artillery Half-Regiment and 8th and 9th Regiments for their reputedly valiant service in combat, particularly commending the leadership of 8th Regiment Commander Nikolai Krylenko and 9th Regiment Commander Vladimir Takhtamyshev. According to Dybenko, during the battles, the regiments successfully repelled the combined Volunteer Army and French squadron, storming their fortifications and pushing them out into the Azov Sea. Hundreds of Volunteer Army Cossacks reportedly surrendered with their weapons during the advance as the 1st Zadneprovsk Division's forces approached Taganrog. In the aftermath of Mariupol's capture, over 3,500,000 pounds of coal were seized while two minesweepers were also taken and redeployed as part of the Soviet Navy. During the offensive, the division lost 18 troops while another 172 were reported wounded. Due to the Ukrainian Soviets' success in Mariupol, Nestor Makhno was awarded the Order of the Red Banner.

As a result of the fighting, industrial plants and railway lines operating in Donbas were largely destroyed or stopped production. A significant part of the workers and their families left the region fleeing the hostilities. At the end of March, the Congress of Councils of the newly created Donetsk Governorate chose an executive committee headed by Fyodor Sergeyev and developed a plan for the reconstruction of industry in Donbas. In April 1919 the de facto capital of the province became Bakhmut, then, when it was decided to expand the province's borders, its authorities were moved to Luhansk.

=== White counteroffensive (April–June) ===
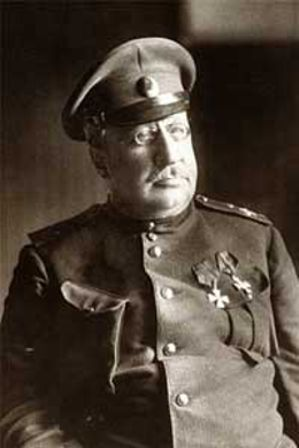
Vladimir May-Mayevsky achieved a series of victories over the Red forces during the fighting for Donbas.

At the end of April 1919, the Whites began a counteroffensive, reinforced by the use of tanks. 60 of the tanks were provided by the Allies as part of the first batch of weapons, together with 200,000 firearms and 500 million pieces of ammunition, as well as 6,200 machine guns and 168 aircraft. In the first clashes in which it was used, the new weapons raised panic among the Reds. Tanks repeatedly approached the red positions without any problems, inflicting serious losses on them, with some Red troops running away at the mere sight of them. Thanks to the use of tanks, May-Mayevsky's troops again took control of Yuzivka, Yasynuvata, Krynychna and Debaltseve. May-Mayevsky successfully used the existing communication network in Donbas, especially the railway lines, to efficiently move between towns. At the head of the forces numbering from 3 to 6 thousand soldiers successfully repelled the attacks of Red Army groups that were over three times or even ten times stronger, in a series of spectacular victories over the red forces. Another factor that contributed to the success of the Whites was the conflict between the command of the Red Army and the Makhnovshchina, who formally submitted to the Soviet command, but did not wish to extend the Bolshevik power to the territory under their control. Nestor Makhno himself did not even maintain contact with the command of the Southern Front of the Red Army, with which he should theoretically have coordinated his actions due to his proximity, nor with the staff of the 13th Army. In May and June 1919, Andrei Shkuro's White troops broke through the Makhnovist defense lines without much difficulty. At that time, Leon Trotsky proclaimed Makhno an outlaw. In the rear of the main front of the fighting between the Red and Whites, clashes between the Bolshevik forces and the Makhnovists took place. In May 1919, the otaman Nykyfor Hryhoriv, allied with them so far, also revolted against the command of the Red Army and the Ukrainian Bolsheviks. His 20,000 troops occupied much of the provinces of Katerynoslav and Kherson for three weeks, thus binding the considerable Red forces. Fighting with the Makhnovists and Hryhorivites exposed the right flank of the 13th Army, which had to withdraw after White tank attacks.

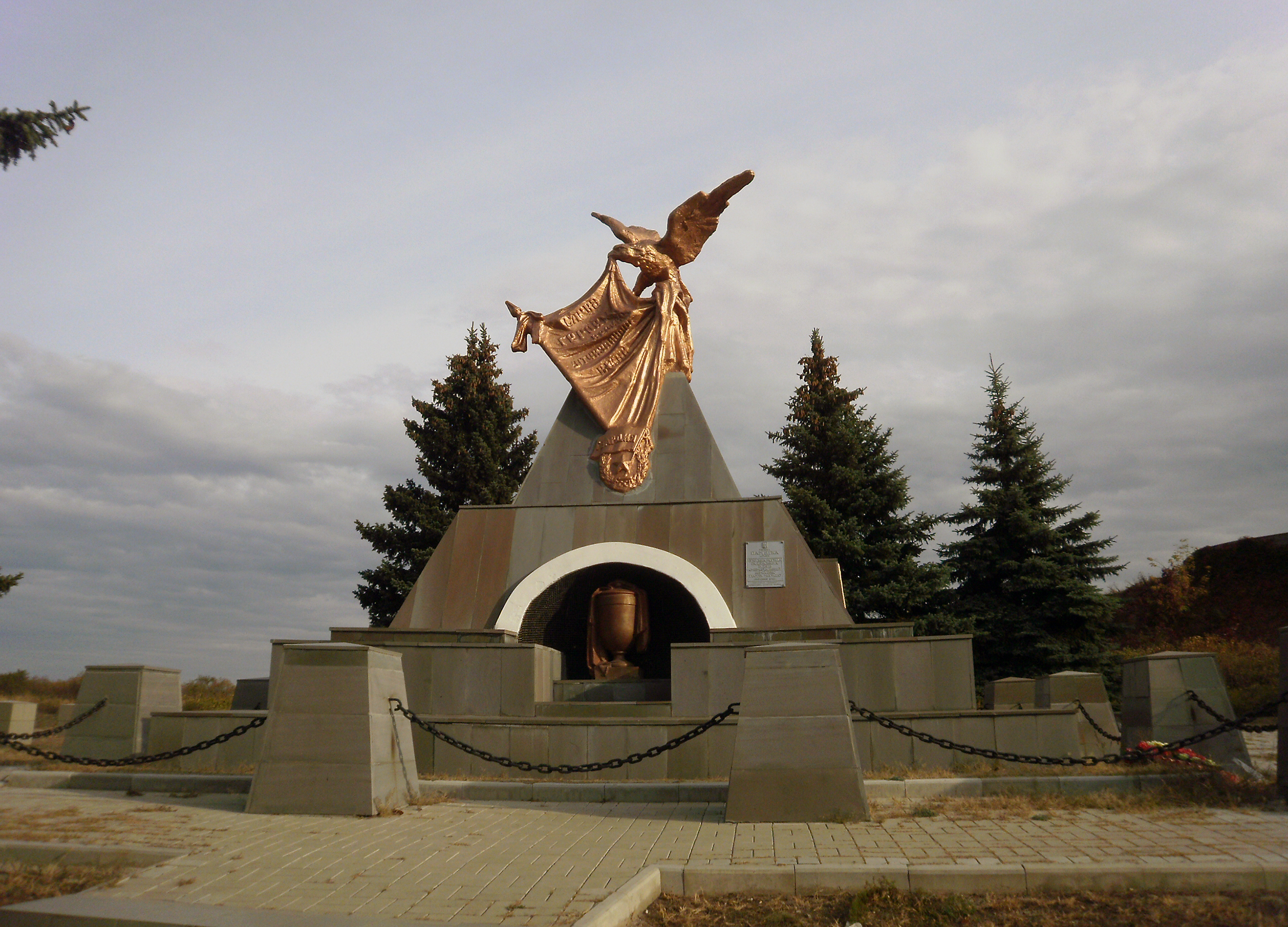
Monument to the defense of Luhansk at the turn of April and May 1919 in Ostraya Mogila.

On 20 April, the front stretched along the Dmitrovsk-Horlivka line, and the Whites even had an open road towards the Ukrainian Soviet capital of Kharkiv. Then Mykitivka, Bakhmut and Sloviansk were seized. On 21 April, Andrei Shkuro's troops arrived at Luhansk, defended by units of the 8th Army, the 1st Moscow Workers' Division and Jānis Lācis's 15th Rifle Division. The mobilization of workers was announced in the city, and a military-revolutionary committee headed by Sergei Lapin was formed. 9,000 volunteers, including workers from Luhansk and Alchevsk, as well as some peasants from nearby villages, joined the 15th Rifle Division. On 30 April, the city's defenders went on a counter-offensive in the area of Ostra Mogila and threw the attackers 30 km from the city, but on 4 May they failed to repel another attack and Luhansk was captured by the Whites.

On 8 May, Vladimir Lenin called the Council of People's Commissars of the Ukrainian SSR for a special mobilization in defense of Donbas. He suggested transferring to this region some of the units that fought at the same time in western and central Ukraine, but his orders were not implemented.

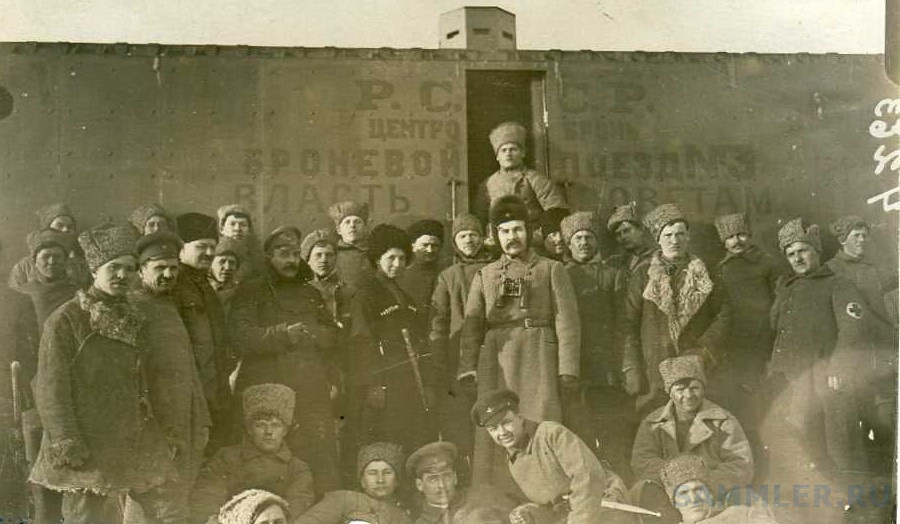
Innokentiy Kozhevnikov, commander of the 13th Army (in the center, with binoculars), surrounded by the crew of an armored train. To the left of him Lyudmila Mokievskaya-Zubok, the only woman in history in command of an armored train; who died in early March in the battle for Debaltseve.

In theory, at the end of April 1919, the Reds still outnumbered the Whites in Donbas, they also had more cannons and machine guns. At the same time, however, the Whites, unlike their opponents, were able to make excellent use of cavalry, and their commanders on the Southern Front significantly exceeded the skills of the red commanders. In particular, Innokentiy Kozhevnikov, Anatoly Skachko (commander of the 2nd Ukrainian Soviet Army between April and June 1919), Tichon Hvesin (commander of the 8th Army from March 1919) and Pavel Knyagnitsky (commander of the 9th Army from November 1918 to June 1919) lacked commanding competences and experience. In addition, in mid-June 1919, the commander of the 9th Army, Nikolai Vsevolodov, defected to the side of the Whites. For the previous few months, while performing the duties of the chief of staff in the same operating union, he had been passing on information about the Red plans to their opponents. Relations between the Red commanders, including former officers or non-commissioned officers of the Imperial Russian Army, and the political commissars and soldiers remained difficult, causing problems with discipline to continue. The combat value of the Red units, which until then had only conducted partisan operations and only shortly before the march on Donbass were organized into the 13th Army, was much lower than the value of experienced units under the command of May-Mayevsky. In the opinion of Nikolai Kakurin, already in mid-April, the weakened 13th Army was not capable of offensive actions. Another factor that contributed to the success of the Whites in Donbas was that the Reds fought on many fronts at the same time - against the interveners in the north, against the Baltic states, in Ukraine, and in March–April also against Alexander Kolchak's Spring offensive in Siberia. It was the latter direction that was considered to be the priority and it received most of the resources.

At the beginning of June 1919, the battle of Donbas ended with a complete victory for the Whites, who continued their offensive into the Left-Bank and Sloboda Ukraine. At the end of the month, the Volunteer Army smashed the Fortified Region, which was being hastily built by the Reds, and on 27 June they captured Kharkiv. After this defeat, Vacietis ordered the forces involved so far in the fighting on the left-bank to withdraw to a "safe zone", i.e. to those governorates in European Russia where Bolshevik power was still secure.

The Whites controlled Donbas until the end of 1919, when after the defeat of Denikin's advance on Moscow, the Red Army again captured this area in the course of Donbas operation.

== See also ==
- Bibliography of the Russian Revolution and Civil War
- Outline of the Russian Revolution and Civil War
- Index of articles related to the Russian Revolution and Civil War
- The "Russian" Civil Wars, 1916–1926: Ten Years That Shook the World
- Russia in Flames: War, Revolution, Civil War, 1914–1921
- Russia in Revolution: An Empire in Crisis, 1890 to 1928
- Russia: Revolution and Civil War, 1917—1921
- The Russian Revolution: A New History

== Bibliography ==
- Adams, Arthur (1963). Bolsheviks in the Ukraine. The Second Campaign, 1918-1919. New Haven: Yale University Press. OCLC 406299.
- Darch, Colin (2020). Nestor Makhno and Rural Anarchism in Ukraine, 1917-1921. London: Pluto Press. pp. 39–72. ISBN 9781786805263. OCLC 1225942343.
- Kenez, Peter (2004). Red Advance, White Defeat. Civil War in South Russia 1919-1920. Washington DC: New Academia Publishing. ISBN 0974493457.
- Malet, Michael (1982). Nestor Makhno in the Russian Civil War. London: Palgrave Macmillan. pp. 29–39. ISBN 978-0-333-25969-6. OCLC 8514426.
- Mawdsley, Evan (2010). Wojna domowa w Rosji 1917–1920 (in Polish). Translated by Monika Popławska. Warsaw: Bellona. ISBN 978-83-11-11638-2. OCLC 750846354.
- Serczyk, W. (2001). Historia Ukrainy (in Polish). Wrocław: Zakład Narodowy im. Ossolińskich. ISBN 83-04-04530-3.
- Skirda, Alexandre (2004) [1982]. Nestor Makhno–Anarchy's Cossack: The Struggle for Free Soviets in the Ukraine 1917–1921. Translated by Sharkey, Paul. Oakland: AK Press. pp. 77–123. ISBN 978-1-902593-68-5. OCLC 60602979.
- Smele, J. D. (2015). The "Russian" Civil Wars 1916-1926. Ten Years That Shook the World. London: C. Hurst & Co. ISBN 9781849047210.
- Suprunenko, M. (1977). Velyka Žovtneva socialistyčna revoljucija i hromadjansʹka vijna na Ukrajini (1917-20). Istorija Ukrajinsʼkoji RSR (in Ukrainian). Kyiv: Naukowa Dumka. OCLC 637625190.
