= 7th Ukrainian Soviet Division =

- 7-ма українська радянська дивізія
- Active: 15 April–July 1919
- Country: Ukraine
- Allegiance: Ukrainian SSR
- Branch: Red Army
- Type: Division
- Part of: Ukrainian Front, 2nd Ukrainian Soviet Army (15–27 April 1919); Southern Front, 2nd Ukrainian Soviet Army. (27 April 27 – 4 June 1919); Southern Front, 14th Army. (4 June – July 1919)
- Engagements: Ukrainian War of Independence

Commanders
- Commander: Nestor Makhno (15 April – 8 June 1919), Alexander Semyonovich Krusser (8–9 June 1919)
- Chief of Staff: Yakov Zakharovich Pokus (15 April – 24 June 1919)

The 7th Ukrainian Soviet Division was a military unit of the Red Army during the Russian Civil War in the armed forces of the Ukrainian SSR.

== History ==
On 24 March 1919, the Revolutionary Military Council of the Ukrainian Front made a decision to create the 1st, 2nd and 3rd Ukrainian Soviet Armies. On 15 April, it reorganized the divisions of the 2nd and 3rd armies into nine regimental divisions.

The 2nd Ukrainian Soviet Army included units of the Group of Forces of the Kharkov direction (management and the 1st Zadneprovskaya brigade of the 1st Zadneprovskaya Ukrainian Soviet Division, the 2nd separate brigade, the 3rd Zadneprovskaya brigade of the 1st Zadneprovskaya Ukrainian Soviet division, the Crimean brigade), which were consolidated into 2 regular divisions:

- The 3rd Ukrainian Soviet Division (former Division Directorate, 1st Zadneprovskaya Brigade of the 1st Zadneprovskaya Ukrainian Soviet Division and other units).
- The 7th Ukrainian Soviet Division (former 3rd Zadneprovskaya Brigade of 1st Zadneprovskaya Ukrainian Soviet Division and other units).

The anarchist Nestor Makhno, the head of the 3rd Zadneprovskaya brigade, was appointed head of the 7th Ukrainian Soviet division. Meanwhile, the bolshevik Yakov Zakharovich Pokus, the chief of staff of the 3rd Rifle Brigade of the 2nd Ukrainian Soviet Division and acting commander of the 2nd Separate Brigade, was appointed chief of staff. In April–June, the division fought with the troops of the Armed Forces of South Russia under the command of Anton Denikin – the Volunteer Army (until 2 May 1919) and the Army of the Don Republic.

On 6 June, the chairman of the Revolutionary Military Council Leon Trotsky issued an order in which he declared the head of the 7th Ukrainian Soviet Division Nestor Makhno outlawed "for the collapse of the front and insubordination to the command." On 8 June, Alexander Semyonovich Krusser replaced Makhno as head of the division. The division then occupied the front section "from the Sea of Azov to Novuspenovka". On 9 June, Krusser issued an order to take over as division chief. He died on the night of 9–10 June at the Pologi station of the Tavricheskaya province during a machine-gun attack on the armored train that he was inside.

Pokus was subsequently appointed commander of the 1st Brigade of the 7th Ukrainian Soviet Division, on 24 June, and later appointed commander of the 3rd regiment of the Separate Bashkir Cavalry Division, on 6 July.

== Bibliography ==
- Zhigalov, I. Dybenko (1983). "Жизнь замечательных людей. Серия биографий". Молодая гвардия (in Russian) (18). Moscow.
- Военный энциклопедический словарь (in Russian). Moscow: Военное издательство. 1984.
- Kiev, Red Banner (1979). Краснознамённый Киевский. Очерки истории Краснознамённого Киевского военного округа (1919–1979) (in Ukrainian) (Second edition, revised and enlarged ed.). Kiev: издательство политической литературы Украины.
- Babel, Isaac (1990). Избранное. Г. Фрунзе издательство "Адабият". Конармия. p. 55.
- Yarotsky, Boris (1977). Дмитрий Ульянов (in Russian). Moscow: «Молодая гвардия».
- Гражданская война и военная интервенция в СССР (in Russian). Moscow: Soviet Encyclopedia. 1983.
- Центральный государственный архив Советской армии (in Russian). Vol. 1. Guide. 1991.
- Savchenko, Victor A. (2006). Двенадцать войн за Украину (in Russian). Kharkiv: Folio.
- Gracezi, Andrea (1997). Большевики и крестьяне на Украине, 1918—1919 годы. Очерк о большевиках, национал-социализмах и крестьянских движениях (in Russian). Moscow: «АИРО-XX». pp. 28–30, 63, 137.
- Arshinov, Peter (1974). History of the Makhnovist Movement (1918—1921). Translated by Lorraine and Fredy Perlman. Black & Red Detroit/Solidarity Chicago.
- Gilyarova, E. A.; Itkis, M. B. (1962). Александр Круссер (1893—1919): Историко-биографический очерк. Герои Гражданской войны (in Russian). Chisinau: Картя Молдовеняскэ.
- Shkuro, A.G. (2004). Гражданская война в России: Записки белого партизана. Moscow: ACT: Транзиткнига.
- Украинская ССР в период гражданской войны 1917–1920. Vol. 2. Kiev: Политиздат Украины. 1968. p. 287.
- Центральный партийный архив Института марксизма-ленинизма при ЦК КПСС.
- "Покус Яков Захарович". РККА. Репрессированные военнослужащие Красной армии. Комкор.
