= Efim Shchadenko =

Soviet military commander and statesman

Yefim Shchadenko
- Russian: Ефим Афана́сьевич Щаде́нко
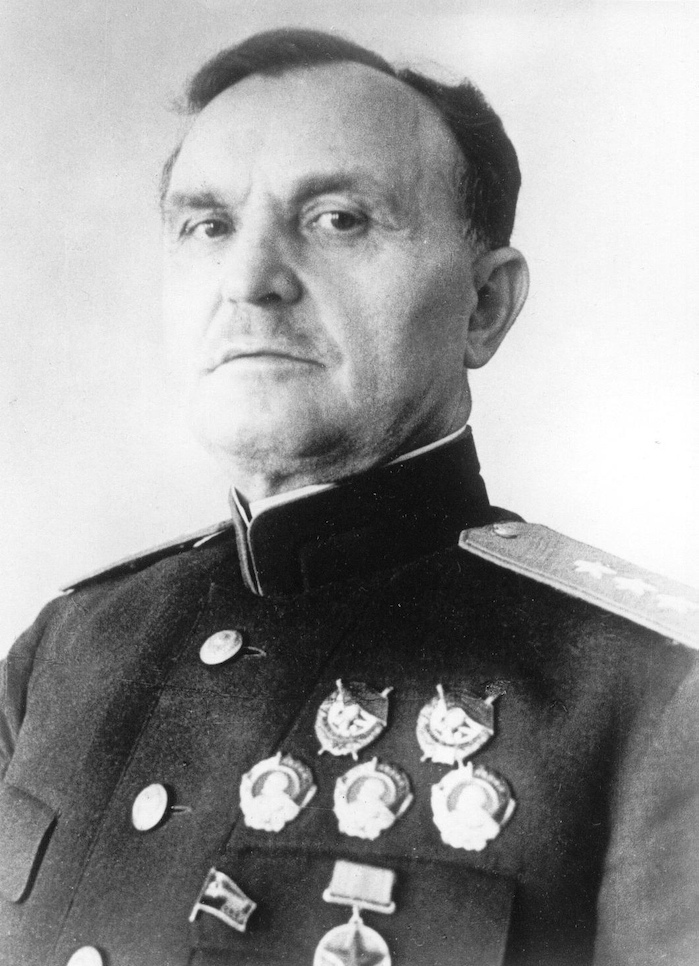
- Born: 27 September 1885; Kamensk-Shakhtinsky, Don Host Oblast, Russian Empire
- Died: 6 September 1951 (aged 65); Moscow, Russian SFSR, Soviet Union
- Burial place: Novodevichy Cemetery
- Military career
- Allegiance: Soviet Union
- Branch: Red Army
- Service years: 1917–1951
- Rank: Colonel general
- Conflicts: Russian Revolution of 1905; Russian Civil War; World War II

Yefim Afanasievich Shchadenko (Russian: Ефим Афана́сьевич Щаде́нко; 27 September [O.S. 15 September] 1885 – 6 September 1951) was a Soviet colonel general who served as Deputy People's Commissar of Defense during the early years of World War II.

== Early life and education ==
Shchadenko was born in to a Ukrainian working-class family and received primary education. He then worked as a tailor.

== Revolutionary activities ==
From 1904 he was active in the underground social democratic movement and joined the Bolshevik wing of the Russian Social Democratic Labour Party in the same year.

He was an active participant in the 1905 Russian Revolution in the Donbass and after the defeat of the revolution he went in to hiding in the Caucasus. He later moved to Vladikavkaz and worked as a tailor while simultaneously being involved in underground Bolshevik circles.

In the tailor shops, he also organized the Igla union, which regularly held strikes. In 1907, relying on the Igla, he organized a massive May Day meeting, where a massive fight broke out between its participants and the Black Hundreds. Shchadenko, as the organizer of the meeting, was threatened with arrest, for which he was forced to leave for Kamenskaya. Without him, the circles he organized fell apart.

In Kamenskaya, on 20 August 1907, a strike of shoemakers was organized, which was dispersed by the authorities. The organizers, including Shchadenko, were arrested, but soon released due to lack of evidence. He continued to organize underground labor unions until his arrest in 1913.

In August 1914, the soldiers of a reserve dragoon cavalry division located near the prison dispersed the prison guards and freed the prisoners. At the same time, Shchadenko met with the non-commissioned officer Semyon Budyonny who served in the battalion.

== Military career ==
After the February Revolution he became chairman of the Kamyansk District Party Committee and the October Revolution he became the commander of the Red Guards in the district. In January 1918 he was elected to the Don Military Revolutionary Committee.

After leaving Ukraine under pressure from German-Austrian troops, Shchadenko formed the Second Don or Morozov-Donetsk Rifle Division from the Morozov and Donetsk Red Guards which later became known as the 38th Rifle Division. From 6 June 1918 he headed the headquarters of the Morozov-Donetsk units, which held the defense against Pyotr Krasnov's troops. On 25 June the Bolshevik units reached the Volga, where they became part of the newly formed Tsaritsyno Front, whose staff commissioner was Shchadenko.

From the autumn of 1918 he participated in the defense of Tsaritsyn under the command of Kliment Voroshilov as a member of the Revolutionary Military Council of the 10th Army. From the beginning to the middle of 1919 he was a member of the RVS of the Ukrainian Front and member of the RVS of the 1st Ukrainian Soviet Army and the 3rd Ukrainian Soviet Army. He was an authorized Commissar of the Ukrainian SSR and commissioner of the Zhytomyr military district. From 19 November 1919 until 1920 he was a member of the RVS of the 1st Cavalry Army under the command of Semyon Budyonny and the Second Cavalry Army where he participated in the fight against the anarchist forces under Nestor Makhno. In 1923 he graduated from two courses of the Military Academy of the Russian Armed Forces. He then served as commander of a cavalry division.

During his studies at the academy, he was awarded the Order of the Red Banner, to which he was presented on 10 April 1922 by Stalin and Voroshilov for their exploits in 1918. At the same time, he underwent an operation to remove his right kidney, which did not allow him to complete his studies.

From 1 April 1924 he was the political inspector of the cavalry of the Red Army. In this position, he took part in the military reform of 1924-1925.

On 1 September 1926 he was sent on long-term leave for health reasons. In January 1927 he was transferred to the disposal of the Main Directorate of the Red Army. He continued treatment, including in Germany. During his illness and treatment, he was engaged in literary work and wrote the history of the 1st Cavalry Army, which, however it was never published.

In March 1930, he was appointed political assistant to the head of the Frunze Military Academy.

From December 1936 he was Deputy Commander for Political Affairs and Head of the Political Administration of the Kharkov Military District. From May 1937 he was a member of the Military Council of the Kiev Military District and from December 1937 to December 1940 he served as Deputy People's Commissar of Defense of the Soviet Union and head of the Command and Control Department of the Red Army. At the same time, from March 1938 to July 1940, he was a member of the Main Military Council of the Red Army.

Shchadenko actively participated in the Great Purge and in the cleansing of the army, specially the organizers of an "illegal fascist conspiracy" which included mostly military officers close to Mikhail Tukhachevsky.

From 1930 to 1934 he was a member of the Central Control Commission, from 1939 to 1941 a member of the Central Committee of the All-Union Communist Party (b) and from 1941 a candidate member of the Central Committee of the VKP(b). He was deputy of the Supreme Soviet of the Soviet Union of the 1st convocation.

During the Second World War, he was Deputy People's Commissar of Defense of the Soviet Union and Head of the Main Directorate of Formation and Manning of the Red Army from August 1941 to May 1943. He was member of the Military Council of the Southern and 4th Ukrainian fronts.

Becoming seriously ill Shchadenko was sent by plane to a hospital in Moscow in November 1943 and never returned to the front. In 1944, he was placed at the disposal of the Main Political Directorate of the Red Army and did not hold any posts after.

== Death and burial ==
Yefim Shchadenko died on 6 September 1951 in Moscow and was buried at the Novodevichy Cemetery.

== Awards and honors ==
- 4 Orders of Lenin
- 4 Orders of the Red Banner
- Order of Suvorov 2nd degree
- Order of the Red Star
- Jubilee Medal "XX Years of the Workers' and Peasants' Red Army"
- Medal "For the victory over Germany in the Great Patriotic War of 1941-1945"
- Medal "For the Defense of Moscow"
- Medal "For the Defense of Stalingrad"

== Bibliography ==
- Гуляев А. А. Е. А. Щаденко и репрессии в Красной армии в 1937—1938 гг. // Вопросы истории. — 2016. — № 10. — С. 145—152.
- Лазарев С. Е., Гуляев А. А. Любовь и ненависть Ефима Щаденко // Родина. — 2015. — № 1. — С. 132—134.
- Лазарев С. Е., Гуляев А. А. От портного до краскома // Военно-исторический журнал. — 2015. — № 1. — С. 45—51.
- Лазарев С. Е., Гуляев А. А. Последняя война Ефима Щаденко // Военно-исторический архив. — 2016. — № 8. — С. 178—191.
