= 1st Zadneprovsk Ukrainian Soviet Division =

- 1-ша Задніпровська Українська радянська дивізія
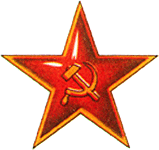
- Red Army badge
- Active: February 21–April 15, 1919
- Country: Ukraine
- Allegiance: Ukrainian SSR
- Branch: Red Army
- Part of: Ukrainian Front
- Engagements: Southern Front of the Russian Civil War: Soviet invasion of Ukraine; Battle for the Donbas; Southern Russia intervention

Commanders
- Division Commander: Pavel Dybenko
- Political Commissar: Alexandra Kollontai
- Chief of Staff: Sergey Ivanovich Petrikovsky
- 1st Brigade Commander: Nykyfor Hryhoriv
- 3rd Brigade Commander: Nestor Makhno

The 1st Zadneprovskaya Ukrainian Soviet Division was a military unit of the Ukrainian Soviet Army during the Russian Civil War.

== History ==
=== Formation ===
On January 26, 1919, a special detachment under the command of Pavel Dybenko, the commander of the 7th Sumy Regiment of the 2nd Ukrainian Soviet Division, captured the city of Katerynoslav during the offensive of the Ukrainian Front. The front was to continue its advance south. The position of the peasantry in the central and southern regions of Ukraine was of decisive importance in this situation. In addition the Katerynoslav railway was of strategic importance as it was the only one in the steppe Ukraine, and therefore the question of control over it was extremely acute. Local rebel groups were located just near this railway.

On January 27, Dybenko and his chief of staff Sergey Ivanovich Petrikovsky were urgently summoned to Kharkiv by the commander of the Ukrainian Front, Vladimir Antonov-Ovseyenko. Antonov-Ovseenko ordered Dybenko to create a rifle division from the rebel and partisan detachments of Northern Tavria (Tavricheskaya province), train personnel and begin to perform combat missions as part of the Ukrainian Front. Dybenko was appointed as the commander of the division, Petrikovsky as the chief of staff, and Aleksandra Kollontai as the chief of the political department.

Upon Dybenko's return from Kharkiv, the commanders of the partisan and rebel detachments of Northern Tavria were summoned by a special telegram, and gathered in the headquarters of the Special Detachment. Dybenko familiarized them with the situation in the south of the province, where the White Guards had entrenched themselves on the line from Tokmak, through Prishib station to the village of Fedorovka and, according to available information, intended to hold the defense at this line. Dybenko announced to the audience about the beginning of the formation of the division, which in March was to go on the offensive and in April to capture the Crimea. Based on the number of units in Northern Tavria, the command of the division planned to form six regiments, combined into three brigades. The anarchist Nestor Makhno was appointed commander of the 3rd Brigade. During this period, Makhnovist detachments advancing from the Donbass fought fierce battles against the 3rd Division of the Volunteer Army.

=== Otaman Hryhoriv's switch to the side of the Red Army ===
In early February, it became known that the Kherson division of the Ukrainian People's Army under the command of Otaman Nykyfor Hryhoriv intended to switch to the side of the Red Army. Hryhoriv broke off relations with the Ukrainian People's Republic command due to the fact that the Directorate of Ukraine agreed with the Entente expansion of the occupation zone, after which the fighters of his division, formed from the rebel detachments of the Kherson region, left their homes and went north. On January 25, the occupation troops landed in Mykolaiv, on January 29–30. Having entered into armed clashes with them against the orders of the Directory, Hryhoriv actually placed himself outside the army of the UPR. Unable to independently resist the Entente offensive, he decided to go over to the side of the Red Army.

On February 1, Hryhoriv entered into negotiations with the Soviet troops – he established contact with the chief of staff of the Special Group of Soviet Forces Petrenko, stating that he was negotiating on behalf of the Borotbist Central Revolutionary Committee. Hryhoriv stated that he had twenty partisan detachments at his disposal, ready to fight against the Ukrainian People's Army, White Guards, Germans and interventionists. The Otaman also had a telephone conversation with Antonov-Ovseyenko. During the negotiations, he agreed to submit to the command of the Red Army, as well as to recognize the Council of People's Commissars of the Ukrainian SSR – thereby, he actually renounced the Borotbist Tsentrrevkom.

On February 2, the chairman of the Council of People's Commissars of the Ukrainian SSR, Christian Rakovsky, reported to Moscow: "There was an agreement between the representatives of our armies operating on the border of the Yekaterinoslav and Kherson provinces and the Otaman Hryhoriv. He is a Ukrainian Social Revolutionary with significant partisan forces and operates in the Kherson province all the way to Mykolaiv ... "

On February 18, the Hryhorivites became part of the 1st Zadneprovsk Ukrainian Soviet Division. According to Order No. 18 for the troops of the Kharkiv Sector Group of Forces dated February 21, 1919, a rifle division was formed from units under the command of Dybenko, Hryhoriva and Makhno, which received the name 1st Zadneprovskaya Ukrainian Soviet Division. Dybenko was appointed head of the division, the 1st Brigade was formed from the insurgent detachments of Otaman Hryhoriv, the 2nd brigade from the insurgent detachments of Northern Tavria, and the 3rd Brigade from the insurgent detachments of Nestor Makhno. At this time, there were more than 5 thousand former rebels under the command of Hryhoriv, armed with 100 machine guns and 10 guns.

In the operational summary of the headquarters of the Revolutionary Military Council of the Group of Forces of the Kharkiv direction of February 5, 1919, it was reported that Hryhoriv's detachments controlled the region of Znamianka-Koristovka-Oleksandriia-Kherson-Kryvyi Rih-Dolgintsevo-Apostolove, as well as the Novo-Poltavka station, north of Mykolaiv. In a summary for February 15, it was reported that Elisavetgrad, Nikopol, Novoukrainka and other settlements were also under the control of the Otaman.

After the Hryhorivites were reorganized into the 1st Brigade of the 1st Zadneprovskaya Ukrainian Soviet Division, the brigade was tasked with keeping the front north of the Voznesensk-Alyoshki-Nikopol-Apostolove-Kryvyi Rih line, restraining the advance of the Entente troops and preventing their connection with the Russian White Guards advancing from Northern Tavria. On February 20, French troops drove the Hryhorivites out of Voznesensk. Meanwhile, Antonov-Ovseenko ordered the Hryhoriv brigade to launch an offensive on the Black Sea coast.

=== Odessa-Mykolaiv operation ===
In early February, an additional 500 French and 2,000 Greek soldiers landed in Kherson, where there were already 500 Entente soldiers. In Mykolaiv, the number of French and Greek troops reached 3 thousand bayonets. The invaders could also count on the remnants of the 15th German Division that remained in the city, with up to 16 thousand bayonets. At all railway stations from Odessa to Kherson, small detachments of 30–40 Entente soldiers were deployed. At large stations, the Entente garrisons numbered 400–500 soldiers.

Having launched a general offensive on Kherson, Hryhoriv recaptured Voznesensk a week later, and the Entente units were forced to create an extended front along the Mykolaiv-Kherson railroad, using up to 8 thousand soldiers, 20 guns, 18 tanks, 4 armored cars and 5 aircraft. Against them at that time Hryhoriv could only put up about 6 thousand peasant rebels with 8 guns. However, the interventionists could not hold back the onslaught of peasant detachments.

By February 27, the Hryhorivites recaptured Belaya Krinitsa and other settlements from the enemy. On February 27, the command of the Soviet troops assigned Hryhoriv a political commissar, and with him 35 more Bolsheviks to carry out political work in the brigade. At the same time, a member of the Borotbist party named Yuriy Tyutyunnyk came to Hryhoriv, and Hryhoriv appointed him his chief of staff. The struggle for political influence in the Hryhorivites continued.

On March 3, the Hryhorivites began the siege of Kherson. On March 8, after five days of stubborn fighting, the Hryhorivites broke into the city, pushing the Greeks back to the port. The command of the Entente troops sent reinforcements to the aid of the Kherson garrison, but they did not manage to disembark and did not take part in the battles. When it became clear to the command of the allied forces in Kherson that defeat was inevitable, the Greeks set fire to the port warehouses, in which several hundred hostages from among the local residents burned to death.

On March 10, the city was taken, while Hryhoriv captured 6 guns, about 100 machine guns and 700 rifles. During the battles for Kherson, the Greeks lost more than 300 soldiers and officers killed and taken prisoner, and 70 prisoners were shot by the Hryhorivites. Hryhoriv ordered to load the corpses of Greek soldiers onto a steamer and send them to the main allied command in Odessa. After the loss of Kherson, a large group of up to 2 thousand Entente bayonets and 2 squadrons of White Guards tried to attack the city, but the Hryhorivites repulsed the attack. In the meantime, soldiers in the French units held a rally and refused to go on the offensive. The French command was forced to withdraw its troops to the Kolosovka station.

Simultaneously with the operation to capture Kherson, the troops of the 1st Brigade attacked Mykolaiv, which was defended by the German 15th Landwehr Division under the command of General Zak-Galhausen (10,000 people). Despite the calls of the Entente command about the need to hold the defense, the German soldiers' committee began negotiations on the surrender of the city. On March 5, Hryhoriv sent an ultimatum to the Mykolaiv City Duma demanding that the city be surrendered immediately. On March 7, the attacks of the Hryhorivites were successfully repulsed by the defenders of the city with heavy losses for the Soviet troops, including from the actions of the German heavy artillery and the naval artillery of the French cruiser stationed at the mouth of the river. However, a few days later, in view of the loss of Kherson and the arrival of fresh reinforcements to the offensive, the French command announced the evacuation of the allied forces, and on March 14 Mykolaiv was surrendered without a fight. In the surrender of Mykolaiv, a significant role was played by the position of the German garrison and the commander of the 15th Division, General Zak-Galhausen, who decided to support the offensive of the Hryhorivites and signed an agreement on the restoration of Soviet power in the city. At the same time, German units disarmed a small volunteer White Guard squad, transferring power in the city and seizing 20 heavy guns, military equipment and more than 2 thousand horses for the Soviet of Workers' Deputies and Hryhoriv's troops.

The seizure of Kherson, Mykolaiv and adjacent territories with the main railways created favorable conditions for the further offensive of the troops of the Kharkiv Direction Group in southern Ukraine.

On March 15, the Hryhorivites recaptured the Rozdilna railway station from the Whites and their main base in southern Ukraine. On March 17, the Hryhorivites captured the Berezivka railway station, which was held by Polish legionnaires, French bayonets and White Guards. In the battles for Berezovka, the invading force lost about 400 people (including about 150 killed); in addition 8 guns, 5 Renault FT-17 tanks, 1 armored train, 7 steam locomotives and about 100 machine guns were seized by the Gregorievites. One of the tanks was sent to Moscow as a gift to Lenin. Four more Renault FT-17 tanks were delivered by rail to the Kharkiv steam locomotive plant for repair and re-equipment.

Leaving Berezovka, the command of the Entente troops nominated General Timanovsky's units of the "Volunteer Army of the Odessa Region" to the front. A thousand volunteers with two guns occupied the front from the Mykolaiv-Odessa railway to the Black Sea, covering Ochakov. Two more cavalry squadrons of volunteers, with the support of the Polish battalion, blocked the Mykolaiv-Odessa railway, and the Greeks (one thousand bayonets) were located in the rear of this defense sector.

On March 20, the commander of the Kharkiv Group of Forces, A. Ye. Skachko, issued order No. 22, in which he assigned the 1st Zadneprovsk Division a combat mission: the 1st brigade of Hryhoriv – to capture Odessa; 2nd brigade Kotov – blockade the Crimean peninsula; 3rd brigade Makhno – go to the line with. Platovka – Mariupol.

On March 22, a strike group was allocated from the Group of Forces of the Kharkiv direction for conducting hostilities in the Odessa direction, which included the 1st Brigade under the command of Hryhoriv. The aggravation of the situation near Kiev prevented the full implementation of these plans, which Antonov-Ovseenko to transfer most of the combat-ready units from the south to the defense of the city from the Petliurists. In the operation to capture Odessa, Hryhoriv had to carry out the forces of his brigade: 1st Verblyuzhsky Regiment (about 3900 people), 2nd Kherson Regiment (about 4000 people), 3rd Tavrichesky Regiment (more than 3000 people). The 1st Brigade was supported only by two attached regiments – the 1st Voznesensky (450 people) and the 15th Ukrainian Soviet Regiment.

Meanwhile, on March 24, the Revolutionary Military Council of the Ukrainian Front made a decision to create the 1st, 2nd and 3rd Ukrainian Soviet armies.

On March 25, the Hryhorivites captured the Serbka station, on March 26, they captured Kolosovka station, and on March 28 the Kremidovka station fell, in battles from which up to 2 thousand of the Entente members were taken prisoner. An attempt by the Entente forces and the Odessa White Guards to conduct a counteroffensive on Serbka on March 29 did not bring success. About 8 thousand French, Greek, Romanian, Polish troops recaptured the station, but the night attack of the Hryhorivites led to the flight of the Entente who, in a hurry, left the Hryhorivites a French plane. On March 29, the White Guards left Ochakov without a fight, after which the defense of the "Odessa White Army" concentrated on the Razdelnaya-Serbka-Odessa sector. Odessa was completely surrounded by "red" rebels. On March 31, the allies tried, with the support of two tanks, to attack Serbka again, but the attack was drowned. In the battles for the station, up to 600 Entente servicemen were killed and seriously wounded.

Despite defeats at the front, the interventionists and White Guards outnumbered the Hryhorivites by several times and could have continued the defense and even launched a counteroffensive, however, on April 2, the chief of staff of the French troops in southern Russia, Colonel A. Freudenberg, falsified the order of the French government to evacuate within three days. While the circumstances were being clarified, the evacuation took on such proportions that it was no longer possible to stop it. On the morning of April 3, the commander of the Entente forces in the South of Russia F. d'Anselm announced the evacuation of the Entente forces from Odessa within 48 hours. On April 6, at about 15.00, the 1st brigade of Hryhoriv entered Odessa, abandoned by the allied forces. On April 7, the People's Commissar for Military Affairs of the Ukrainian SSR, Nikolay Ilyich Podvoisky, notified the Soviet government by telegram about the capture of Odessa.

The Group of Forces of the Odessa Sector was formed as part of the Ukrainian Front, by separating troops from the Group of Forces of the Kharkiv Sector. The group also included the 1st Zadneprovskaya Brigade of the 1st Zadneprovskaya Ukrainian Soviet Division. On April 14, Soviet troops took Razdelnaya. Romanian troops withdrew across the Dniester. On April 18, Ovidiopol was taken, and a little later – Tiraspol.

=== Actions of the 2nd and 3rd brigades ===
In mid-March, the commander of the Ukrainian Front, Antonov-Ovseenko, ordered "to reinforce the Makhno group to eliminate Berdyansk-Mariupol" (French Navy ships entered the ports of Mariupol and Berdyansk in December 1918) with units of the 2nd Brigade operating in the Crimean direction, and the 16th regiment of the 1st Brigade. On March 14, the 1st Zadneprovsk Division captured Melitopol, cutting the White Azov front in two. On March 15, the Makhnovists occupied Berdyansk, on March 17 they captured Volnovakha and on March 19 approached Mariupol.

On March 20, the commander of the Kharkiv group of forces, Anatoly Evgenievich Skachko, assigned the Zadneprovsk Division and its 3rd Brigade to enter the Platovka-Mariupol line and gain a foothold on it. On March 27, during the battle with the Makhno brigade for Mariupol, the Entente naval forces stationed in the roadstead of Mariupol intervened in hostilities, fired at the advancing Makhnovists and created a small landing. However, on March 29, an agreement was signed with the Makhnovist delegation, establishing a one-day truce for the evacuation of the port. During this day, French ships removed from the port of Mariupol several unfinished ships, valuables and refugees. The 9th Greek Regiment, which took part in the liberation of Mariupol from the White Army, was awarded the honorary Red Banner.

The 2nd Brigade during this period fought with the troops of the Crimean-Azov army for the Chongarsky and Perekop isthmuses of the Crimean peninsula. On April 5, the division completed its task – it captured the Isthmus of Perekop and had to stop at advantageous positions, locking up the Whites in Crimea. Not encountering serious resistance, Dybenko sent the divisional command, the 2nd rifle brigade, the engineer battalion and other units to the peninsula. The division was supported by a special purpose armored division under the Council of People's Commissars of the Ukrainian SSR. On April 10, the 2nd Rifle Brigade occupied Simferopol.

=== Disbandment ===
On April 15, by order of the Ukrainian Front, the 2nd and 3rd Ukrainian Soviet armies were created:

- The 2nd Ukrainian Soviet Army was created from units of the Group of Forces of the Kharkiv direction (Directorate, 2nd and 3rd Zadneprovsk brigades of the 1st Zadneprovskaya Ukrainian Soviet division, 2nd separate brigade, Crimean brigade), which were deployed into two regular divisions : 3rd Ukrainian and 7th Ukrainian.
  - The 3rd Ukrainian Soviet Division was to be formed on the basis of the command of the division and the 2nd Brigade of the 1st Zadneprovsk division and other units.
  - The 7th Ukrainian Soviet Division (Chief of Division N.I.Makhno) was to be formed on the basis of the 3rd Brigade of the 1st Zadneprovskaya Division, and other units.
- The 3rd Ukrainian Soviet Army was created from units of the Group of Forces of the Odessa direction, which were reduced to two regular divisions (5th and 6th Ukrainian Soviet divisions).
  - The 5th Ukrainian Soviet Division was to be formed in Kiev. The chief of the division is M. V. Sluvis.
  - The 6th Ukrainian Soviet Division (Chief of the Division N.A. Hryhoriv) was to be formed on the basis of the 1st Brigade of the 1st Zadneprovskaya Division and other units.

== Bibliography ==
- Zhigalov, I. Dybenko (1983). "Жизнь замечательных людей. Серия биографий" (in Russian). Moscow: «Молодая гвардия».
- Военный энциклопедический словарь (in Russian). Moscow: Военное издательство. 1984.
- Kiev, Red Banner (1979). Краснознамённый Киевский. Очерки истории Краснознамённого Киевского военного округа (1919–1979) (in Ukrainian) (Second edition, revised and enlarged ed.). Kiev: издательство политической литературы Украины.
- Babel, Isaac (1990). Избранное. Г. Фрунзе издательство "Адабият". Конармия. p. 55.
- Yarotsky, Boris (1977). Дмитрий Ульянов (in Russian). Moscow: «Молодая гвардия».
- Antonov-Ovseenko, V. (1924–1933). Notes on the Civil War. Moscow: State military publishing house. Archived from the original on October 29, 2013.
- Selyavkin, A.I. (1981). В трёх войнах на броневиках и танках. Автоброневой дивизион особого назначения (in Russian). Kharkiv: Prapor.
- Kolomiets, M.; Moshchanskiy, I.; Romadin, S. (1999). Танки гражданской войны. Armada (in Russian). Moscow: Exprint.
