= Crimean Soviet Army =

The Crimean Soviet Army was a field army of the Red Army during the Russian Civil War, which existed between May 5, 1919 and July 21, 1919. It was first part of the Ukrainian Front and from June 4 of the 14th Army. On July 21, 1919 the Army was disbanded, and it was reorganised as the Crimean Rifle Division, called 58th Rifle Division from July 27.

== History ==
The troops of the Crimean Soviet Army fought in the Crimea against the Armed Forces of South Russia, in the area of Polohy - Berdyansk - Melitopol in the Northern Taurida. The White Guards managed to hang on to the Kerch Peninsula, defending a front on the Aqmanai isthmus.

In May–June the Crimean Army took part in the suppression of the Grigoriev uprising.

In mid-June 1919, under the pressure of the White Army advance, the entire Red Army was forced out of the Crimea.

== Commanding staff ==
=== Commander ===
- Pavel Dybenko (May 5 – July 21, 1919).

=== RVS members ===
- J. J. Peche (June 5 - July 21, 1919),
- V.N.Tolmachev (June 5 - July 21, 1919)

=== Chief of staff ===
S.I. Petrikovsksy

=== Head of the Political Department ===
Alexandra Kollontai

== Bibliography ==
- Civil war and military intervention in the USSR. Encyclopedia. Moscow: Soviet Encyclopedia, 1983.
