= Hryhoriv Uprising =

Armed protest in Ukraine in 1919

- Part of the Ukrainian War of Independence
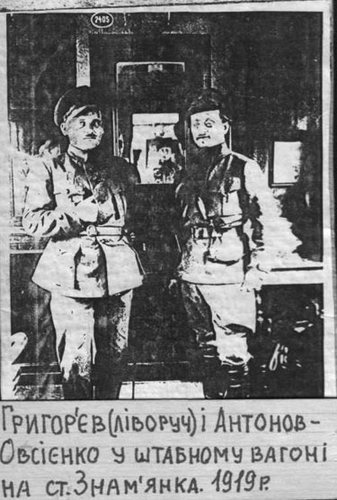
- Nikifor Hryhoriv and Vladimir Antonov-Ovseenko, commander of the Ukrainian Front of the Red Army, before the outbreak of the revolt, Znamianka station, spring 1919
Date	7 May – 27 July 1919
Location	Kherson Governorate, Ukraine
Result	Uprising defeated; Red Army recaptures rebel-held territory; Nykyfor Hryhoriv assassinated by the forces of Nestor Makhno

Belligerents
Hryhorivshchyna	Ukrainian SSR; Makhnovshchina

Commanders and leaders
Nykyfor Hryhoriv X Yuriy Tyutyunnyk; Artem Maksiuta (executed)	Vladimir Antonov-Ovseenko; Kliment Voroshilov; Pavel Dybenko; Alexander Parkhomenko; Anatoly Skachko; Nikolai Khudiakov Nestor Makhno; Semen Karetnyk; Viktor Bilash

Units involved
Peasant Division	Ukrainian Front: 1st Ukrainian Army; 2nd Ukrainian Army; 3rd Ukrainian Army

Strength
15,000	30,000

The uprising of Nykyfor Hryhoriv was an armed protest against the Bolshevik rule in Ukraine in May 1919, which covered the area between Mykolaiv and Kherson, Katerynoslav, Yelysavethrad, Cherkasy, Kremenchuk and Kryvyi Rih. Its leader was otaman Nykyfor Hryhoriv, who gathered around him guerrilla troops of peasants rebelling against food requisitions and repression led by the Cheka.

On 8 May 1919, Hryhoriv published a Universal, in which he called for "the Ukrainian people to take power into their own hands" and proclaimed a "Soviet Ukraine without communists". His call was also taken up by the garrisons of the Red Army in Cherkasy, Verkhnodniprovsk and Katerynoslav, as well as sailors from Mykolaiv, Kherson and Ochakiv. Numerous pogroms took place in the area conquered by Hryhoriv's supporters. The uprising was suppressed at the end of May 1919 by units of the Red Army under the command of Kliment Voroshilov, Alexander Parkhomenko and Pavel Dybenko; peasant units in the face of clashes with larger regular forces dispersed, surrendered or defected.

On 22 May, the Red Army seized the center of the rebellion - Oleksandriia, and on 26–31 May, it again seized Mykolaiv, Ochakiv and Kherson. Hryhoriv, who hid from the pursuit with the rest of his supporters and reached the area controlled by Nestor Makhno's Revolutionary Insurgent Army, announced his joining the Makhnovist movement. In fact, however, he maintained contacts with Anton Denikin's White movement and considered recognizing his sovereignty, for which he was shot by Makhno. His troops joined with the Makhnovist forces.

Hryhoriv's uprising disintegrated the Ukrainian Front of the Red Army and largely thwarted its command's plans to march to Bessarabia, join the region to the Soviet state, and then intervene in Hungary and extend the communist revolution to Romania.

== Background ==
At the end of 1918, Nykyfor Hryhoriv was the commander of the 6,000-strong Peasants' Division, with which he took part in the uprising against Hetmanate, on the side of Directorate. Formally, the division was subordinate to the Southern Group of the Ukrainian People's Army, but in fact the control of the UPA over it was only partial. In January 1919, when the Red Army invaded Ukraine, Hryhoriv decided that the Directorate was doomed and decided to go over to the side of the victorious Bolsheviks. The second reason that prompted him to switch front was that Symon Petliura did not allow him to attack Allied Intervention Forces landing in Odesa.

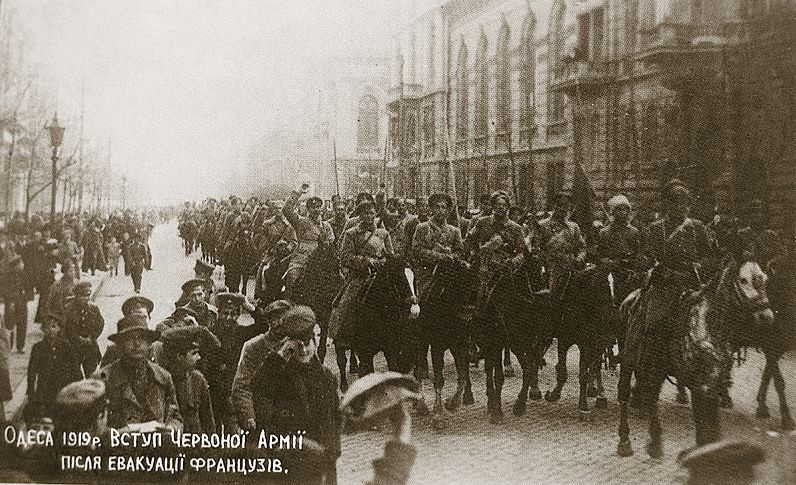
Hryhoriv's cavalry enters Odesa, 6 April 1919

On 2 February 1919, Hryhoriv recognized the sovereignty of the Red Army command in Ukraine. That month, the troops he commanded, under the name of the 1st Zadneprovsk Brigade, displaced the forces loyal to the Directorate from Kryvyi Rih, Znamianka, Bobrinskaya and Yelysavethrad, forcing them to depart to Podolia and Volhynia. Then, in early March 1919, Hryhoriv ousted the Allies from Kherson, then entered Mykolaiv, where the local Bolsheviks had already taken power from the hands of retreating German troops, and finally, on 6 April 1919, he entered Odesa, abandoned the day before by the French intervention forces.

Bolshevik party activists were directed to the areas of the Mykolaiv, Kherson and Odesa under the control of Hryhoriv, in order to organize the power structures, conscript people into the Red Army and requisition food. These actions met with resistance from the local population. The Bolshevik policy of war communism was also criticized by Vladimir Antonov-Ovseenko, the commander of the Red Army's Ukrainian Front, who predicted a general revolt against the Ukrainian Soviet government. Simultaneously, after the conquest of Odesa, Hryhoriv dismissed his troops for a three-week "rest", allowing the soldiers to return to their places of origin, instead of supporting Nikolai Khudiakov in the attack on Tiraspol. On the way, Hryhoriv's soldiers committed a series of antisemitic pogroms and generalised looting.

At the end of April 1919, Vladimir Antonov-Ovseenko made an attempt to reach an agreement with Hryhoriv, who commanded the largest grouping of troops on the front and whose attitude essentially determined the success of further plans, including the concept of a march against the Romanian troops in Bessarabia and an intervention in Hungary. Antonov-Ovseenko met Hryhoriv personally in his quarters in Oleksandriia. The Otaman complained to him about the policy of repression and requisitioning against the Ukrainian peasantry. Recognizing that there were many reasons in Hryhoriv's arguments and observing the mood among his soldiers, Antonov-Ovseenko decided to persuade him to continue his service in the Red Army. Seeing an ambitious adventurer in the otaman, the commander-in-chief of the Ukrainian Front entrusted him with the prestigious mission of the march to Bessarabia, convincing him that winning victories over the Romanians would allow him to contribute to spreading the revolution in Europe and ensure him enormous personal fame. On 23 April, Hryhoriv agreed to carry out these orders.

== Uprising ==
After the occupation of Odesa and the acquisition of new volunteers, Hryhoriv's peasant division was transformed into the 6th Ukrainian Soviet Division. The Otaman had 15,000 infantry, three cavalry squadrons and 44 guns under his command. In addition, he took 30,000 rifles from the city, and in total he obtained a further 300 machine guns and 40 guns in the course of the battles. Thus, he had at his disposal greater forces than the 2nd Army (10,300 soldiers) and the 3rd Army (13,863 soldiers), which were operating in the nearby regions.

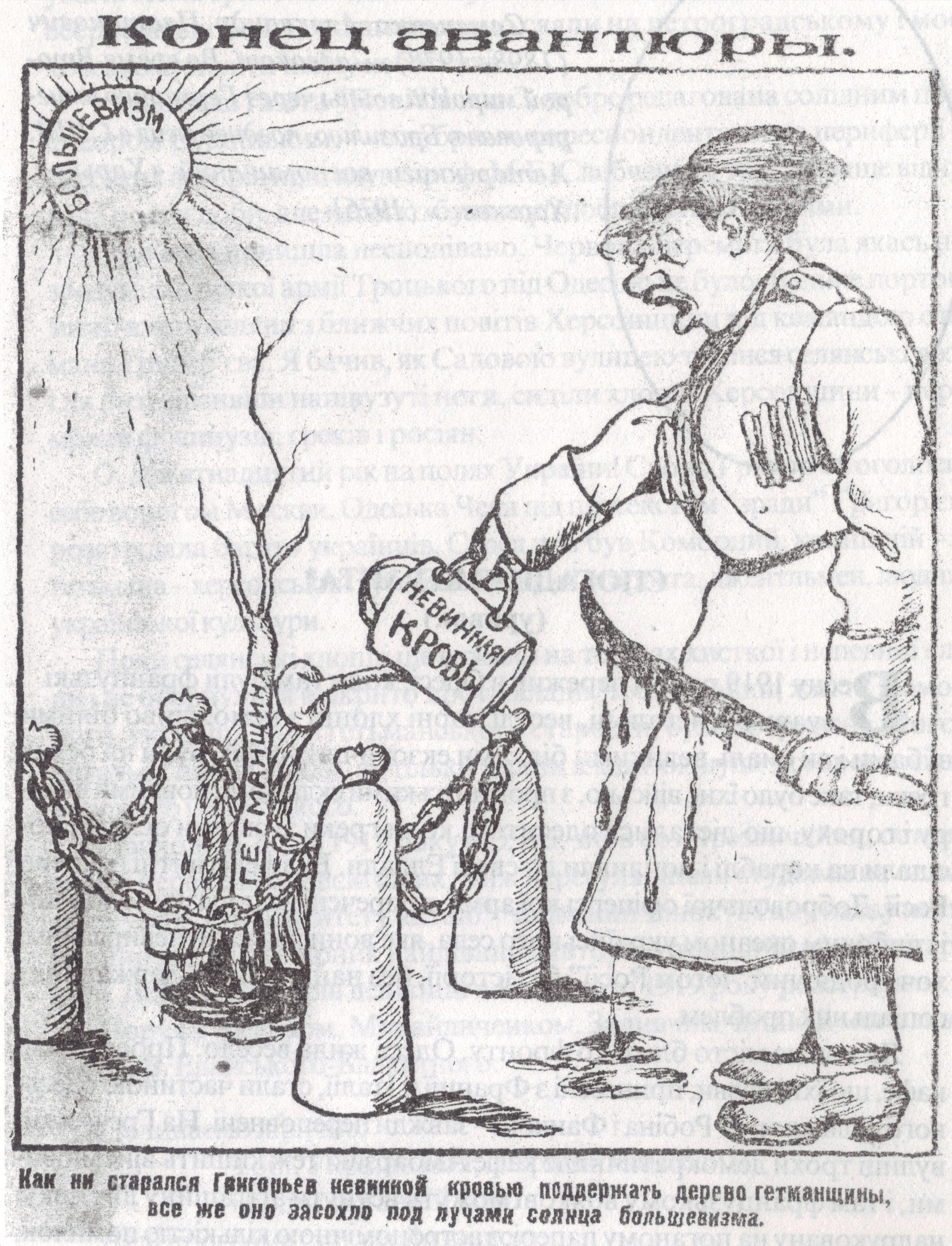
Soviet caricature depicting Hryhoriv as attempting to revive the Hetmanate

The Otaman never proceeded to carry out the orders to march on Bessarabia. Immediately after the departure of Antonov-Ovseenko from his quarters, his soldiers started looting, attacking the Jewish population and communist officials. In the first days, Hryhoriv punished some cases of such behavior of soldiers, and assured the authorities of the Ukrainian SSR and the command of the Ukrainian Front about his loyalty. On 29 April, Antonov-Ovseenko, alerted by reports of attacks on communists in the places where Hryhoriv's soldiers were stationed, went again to Oleksandriia, returning from another inspection at Nestor Makhno's headquarters of Huliaipole. Upon leaving, the commander of the Ukrainian Front still believed that the rebellion could be prevented, although he was concerned about the nervous behavior of the otaman. At the same time, in the Kherson Governorate, where Hryhoriv's soldiers were stationed, mass peasant riots began against forced food requisitions and repression by Cheka.

On 7 May, Bolshevik commissars in Yelysavethrad and at Hryhoriv's staff informed Kyiv and Odesa party organizations that the Otaman had rebelled against the government of the Ukrainian SSR. On this and the next day, Hryhoriv published a Universal, in which he proclaimed:

"Ukrainian people, take power into your own hands. Let there be no dictatorship, neither of the person nor of the party. Long live the dictatorship of the working people... Long live the power of the Councils of the people of Ukraine... "We ask the government of the adventurer Rakovsky and his henchmen to leave us and not violate the will of the people. The All-Ukrainian Congress of Soviets will give us a government to which we will submit and faithfully fulfill its will."

The Otaman called for the organization of village, district and provincial councils, each with 80% of seats reserved for Ukrainians, 5% for Jews and 15% for the rest, with the admission of representatives of all parties and non-party members that supported the concept of Soviet power. In a telegraph conversation with Antonov-Ovseenko himself, he declared that he identified himself with the Borotbists. In Yelysavethrad, Hryhoriv disarmed a Bolshevik unit and destroyed the premises of Communist Party of Ukraine. He then directed some of his troops to Katerynoslav, Mykolaiv and Kherson, attacking multiple targets simultaneously. In a telegraph conversation with the commander of the Ukrainian Front, he also announced an attack on Kyiv and Kharkiv.

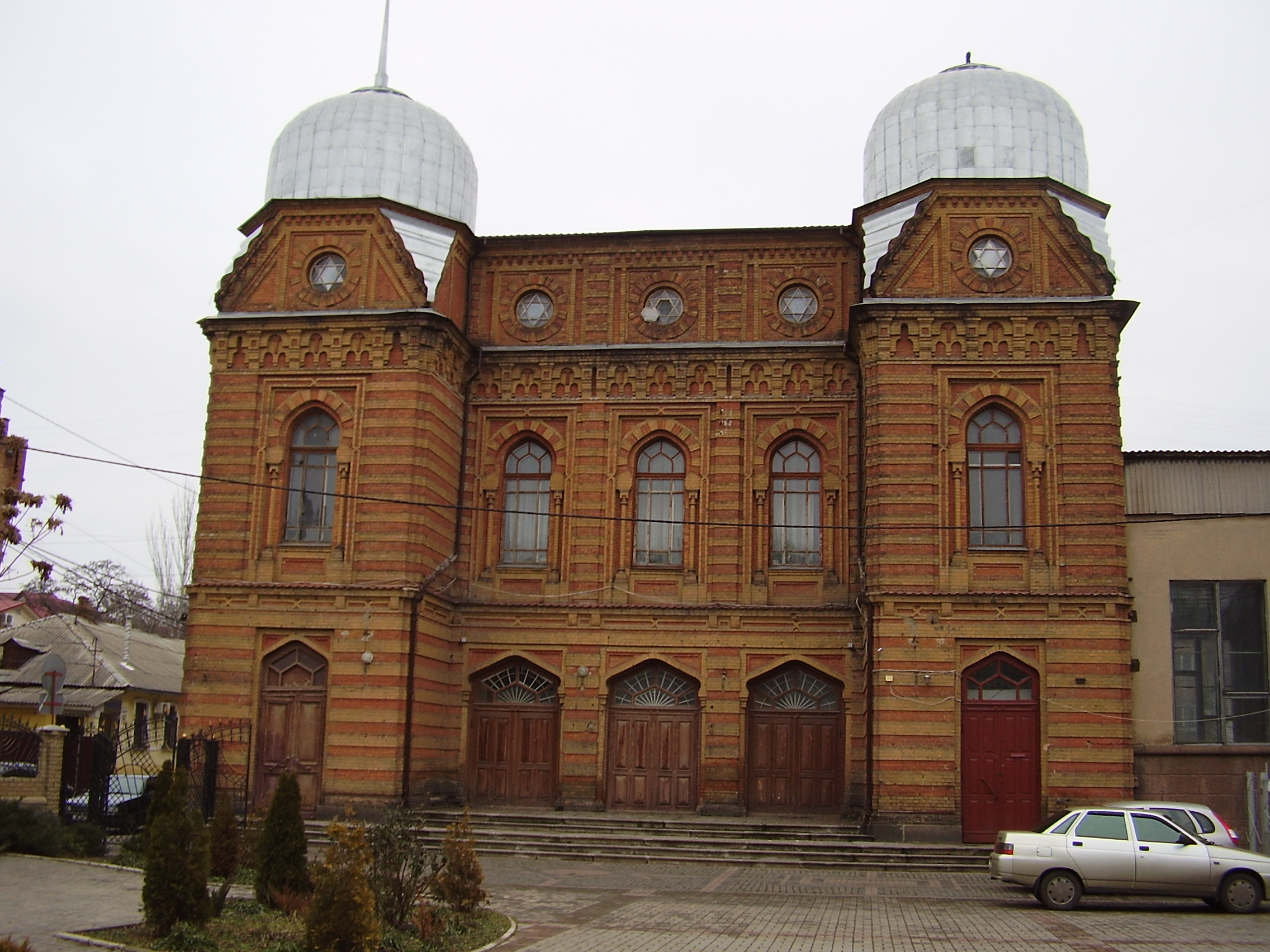
Great Choral Synagogue in Yelysavethrad (today Kropyvnytskyi) robbed during the uprising

On 10 May, the Defense Council of the Ukrainian SSR declared Hryhoriv outlawed and ordered, if arrested, to shoot him and his associates on the spot. A day later, the Otaman's troops reached Katerynoslav, from which the Red Army units hurriedly retreated, as the garrison of the nearby Verkhnodniprovsk defected to the rebels. Anatoly Skachko, commanding the Bolshevik forces in Katerynoslav, panicked at the news of the coming rebels and, contrary to Antonov-Ovseenko's orders, did not even attempt to defend the city. On 12 May, in the city itself, the cavalry unit of the anarchist Artem Maksiuta and the Black Sea regiment commanded by the sailor Orlov rebelled against the Bolsheviks; these forces took control of Katerynoslav and let Hryhoriv's troops into the city. The local Cheka's outpost and the prison were defeated, and the rebels also carried out a pogrom. It was only on 15 May that Hryhoriv's troops were forced out of Katerynoslav by a group of troops under the command of Alexander Parkhomenko, who ordered the shooting of every tenth captured rebel, and threw several thousand participants in prison. They managed to raise a new revolt, as a result of which the Bolshevik troops had to leave the city for a few more days.

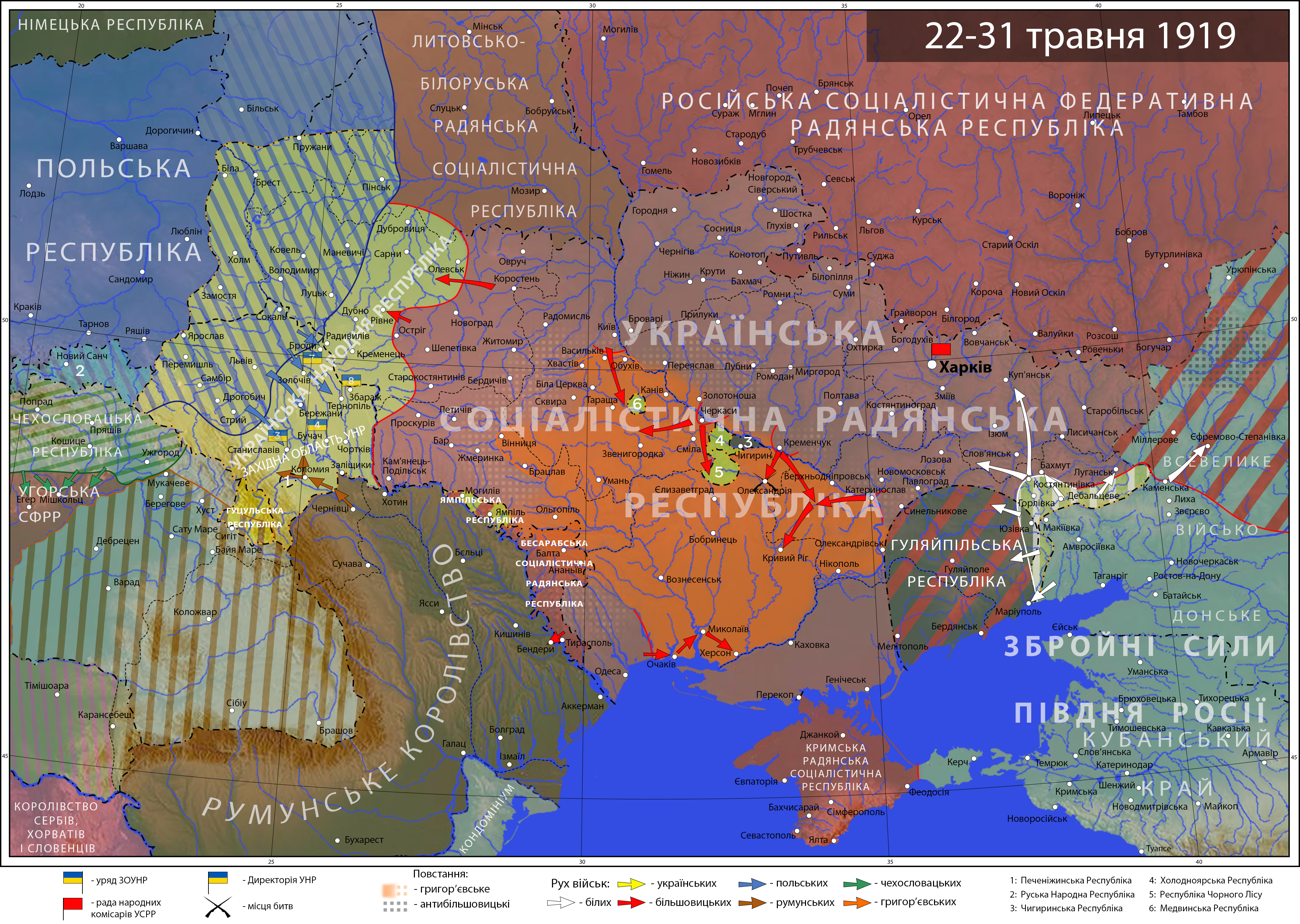
Territories controled by the rebels at the end of May 1919 (orange); lands controlled by the Red Army are in red, and by Ukrainian armies in green

On 15 May, Hryhoriv's supporters initiated an armed uprising in Bila Tserkva, on 16 May, sailors from Ochakiv and a new executive committee of the councils in Kherson, led by Left Socialist-Revolutionaries and supported by local garrison, threw their support behind him. For the next two weeks, Kherson remained under the control of Hryhoriv as an "independent Soviet republic". In order to prevent a similar development in Odesa, where Hryhoriv's supporters had already begun to mobilize, Nikolai Khudiakov and Yefim Shchadenko declared a state of emergency in the city, preventing the anti-Bolshevik outburst. On 16 May, the participants of the uprising took control of Cherkasy, where for several days they carried out antisemitic pogroms.

On 20 May, the rebels seized Mykolaiv, where soldiers and sailors under the command of sailors Yevgrakov and Proskurenko drove the Bolsheviks out of the city, destroyed the Cheka's outpost and let Hryhoriv's troops into the city. On 20 May, Hryhoriv also controlled Bratslav and Vinnytsia for one day. Moreover, he gained some support in Podolia, where the fight against the Bolsheviks was undertaken by others, inspired by his uprising.

== Defeat ==
On 12 May, Kliment Voroshilov was appointed responsible for suppressing anti-Bolshevik protests in Left-Bank Ukraine. He was authorized by Antonov-Ovseenko to act on his own, without waiting for orders from the government of the Ukrainian SSR. Regardless of this, Antonov-Ovseenko ordered all groups of the Ukrainian Front to move against Hryhoriv, so that his forces were surrounded: Nikolai Khudiakov from Odesa was directed towards Znamianka and Yelysavethrad, the 2nd division of the 1st Ukrainian Army of Lengenovski entered Cherkasy, and Pavel Dybenko was supported from the south by the troops of Alexander Parkhomenko that were operating in the regions of Poltava and Katerynoslav. After the first clashes with the Red Army, Hryhoriv's troops began to surrender, disperse or return to the red command. On 19 May, a group of troops under the command of P. Yegorov defeated supporters of the Otaman at Kremenchuk, and the Dnieper war flotilla finally left Cherkasy.

At the end of the month, Hryhoriv's main force was defeated at Kamianka. On 22 May, the Red Army seized the center of his movement - Oleksandriia, a day later Znamianka, and between 26 and 31 May, it retook Mykolaiv, Ochakiv and Kherson. In Kherson, Hryhoriv's close associates, Horbenko and Maslenko, were captured and shot.

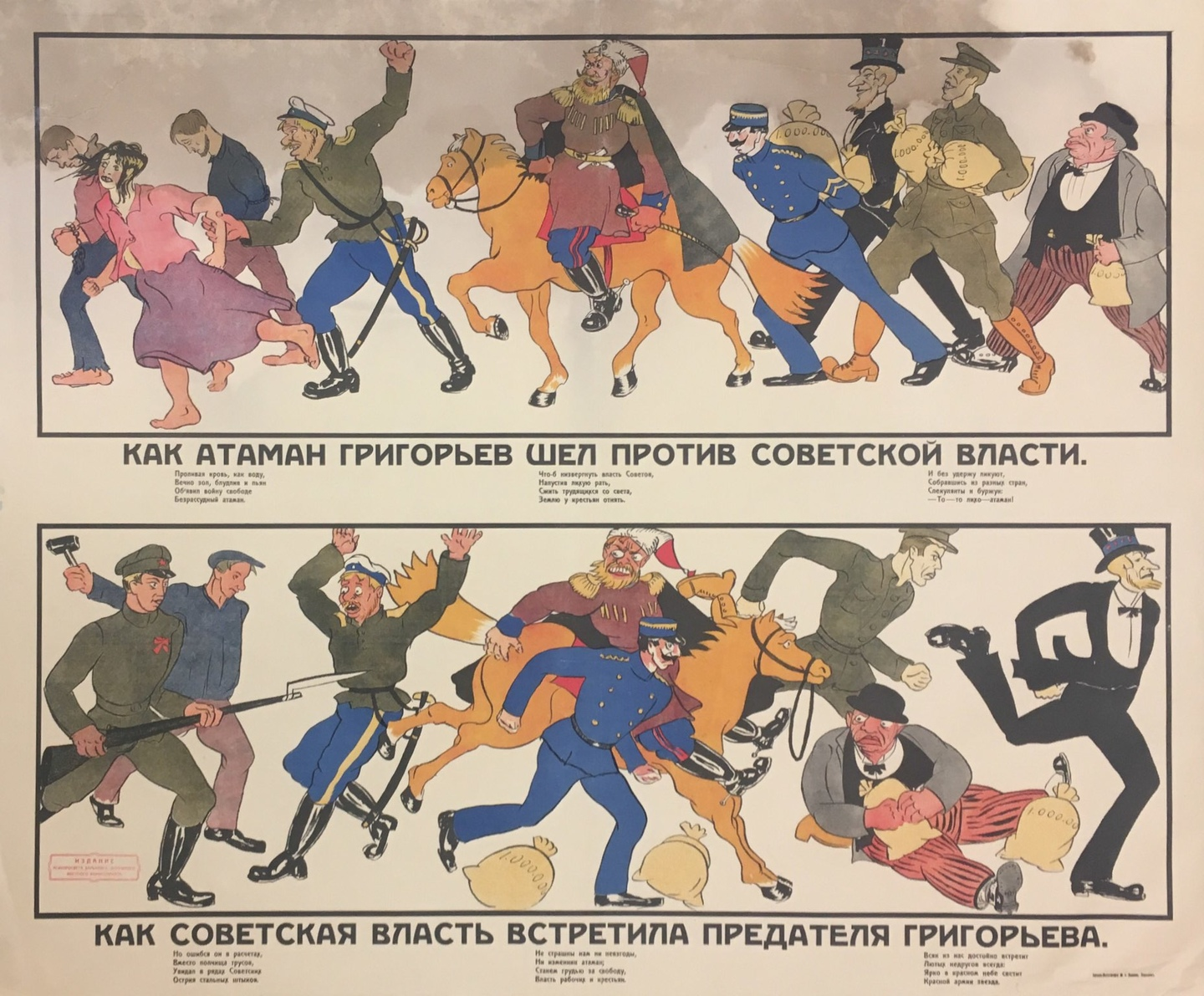
Soviet caricature

Hryhoriv's supporters held Boryslav, Kakhovka, Nikopol in their hands for some time, attacking military transports going to Crimea and making raids towards Oleksandriia. Other Otamans continued to fight the Bolsheviks on a smaller scale. However, in June 1919, the Red Army command ceased to treat the Otaman as a serious threat, as only 3,000 remained under his command. That same month, Nestor Makhno met with Hryhoriv, proposing a joint fight against both the Reds and the Whites. Both commanders decided to join forces, but their agreement quickly broke down. Hryhoriv considered moving to the side of White movement and submitting to Anton Denikin, which the Makhnovshchina considered treason. Hryhoriv was shot and his troops joined the forces of Revolutionary Insurgent Army of Ukraine. However, the remnants of the group under the command of Yuriy Tyutyunnyk broke through to Podolia, reaching the units of the Ukrainian People's Army and then joining them.

Hryhoriv's uprising disintegrated the Ukrainian Front of the Red Army and largely thwarted its command's plans to march to Bessarabia, join the region to the Soviet state, and then intervene in Hungary and extend the communist revolution to Romania.

== Bibliography ==
- Adams, Arthur (1963). Bolsheviks in the Ukraine. The Second Campaign, 1918-1919. New Haven: Yale University Press. OCLC 406299.
- Legięć, Jacek (2002). Armia Ukraińskiej Republiki Ludowej w wojnie polsko-ukraińsko-bolszewickiej w 1920 r. [Army of the Ukrainian People's Republic during the Polish-Ukrainian-Bolshevik War in 1920] (in Polish). Toruń: Adam Marszałek Publishing House. ISBN 83-7322-053-4. OCLC 830348874.
- Kenez, Peter (2004). Red Advance, White Defeat. Civil War in South Russia 1919-1920. Washington DC: New Academia Publishing. ISBN 0974493457.
- Mishina, A.V. (2006). "Н.А. Григорьев - Атаман повстанцев Херсонщины" [N. A. Hryhoriv - Otaman of the Kherson insurgents]. New Historical Bulletin (in Russian). 1 (15). Moscow: Ippolitov Publishing House: 1–7. ISSN 2072-9286. OCLC 844626269.
- Smele, J. D. (2015). The "Russian" Civil Wars 1916-1926. Ten Years That Shook the World. London: C. Hurst & Co. ISBN 9781849047210.
