= 2nd Ukrainian Soviet Army =

- Друга українська радянська армія
- Active: April 15–June 4, 1919
- Allegiance: Ukrainian Soviet Socialist Republic
- Branch: Red Army
- Part of: Ukrainian Front (April); Southern Front (May)
- Engagements: Soviet–Ukrainian War: Ukraine Offensive; Battle for the Donbass

Commanders
- Notable commanders: Anatoly Skachko

The 2nd Ukrainian Soviet Army was a field army of the Red Army during the Russian Civil War, which was formed on April 15, 1919, from the units of the Group of Forces of the Kharkov Direction. It was first part of the Ukrainian Front and from April 27 of the Southern Front. On June 4, 1919, the Army was disbanded and its formations became part of the 14th Army of the Southern Front. The Army headquarters were in Yekaterinoslav.

== History ==
The Second Ukrainian Soviet Army fought against the French interventionists, capturing Sevastopol and Crimea from them, and against the White Volunteers in the Donbass. On April 5, the 1st Zadneprovskaya Ukrainian Soviet Division captured the Perekop Isthmus, locking the Whites in the Crimea, but had to stop at advantageous positions, because the order of the higher command to advance did not follow.

In April 1919, the 2nd Ukrainian Soviet Army broke through the fortifications of the Whites on Perekop and captured a significant part of Crimea, taking Sevastopol on April 29. Then, the Army occupied the coast of the Azov Sea from Henichesk to Mariupol. In May, the Army took part in the suppression of the Grigoriev uprising in the area of Yekaterinoslav. After that, the Army conducted defensive battles against Denikin's troops in the areas of Ilovaisk, Svatove and Kupyansk.

In June 1919, the 2nd Ukrainian Soviet Army was reorganized into the 14th Army under the command of Kliment Voroshilov, which in 1919–20 fought in battles against Denikin's White Army and Poland.

== Composition ==
The 2nd Ukrainian Soviet Army was created from the units of the Group of Forces of the Kharkov Direction (1st Zadneprovsk Ukrainian Soviet Division, 2nd separate brigade, 3rd brigade, Crimean brigade), which were consolidated into 2 regular divisions:

- 3rd Ukrainian Soviet Division (commanded by Pavel Dybenko)
- 7th Ukrainian Soviet Division (commanded by Nestor Makhno)

== Command ==
Commander:

- Anatoly Skachko (April 7 – June 7, 1919).

RVS members:

- V. Ya.Dutsis (April 7 – June 7, 1919),
- A. Tishchenko (April 7 – May 5, 1919),
- Mikola Vishnevetsky (May 5 – June 7, 1919).

Chief of Staff:

- N. A. Kartashov (April 7 – June 7, 1919)

== See also ==
- 2nd Army

== Bibliography ==
- "Civil war and military intervention in the USSR". Soviet Encyclopedia. Moscow. 1983.
- Savchenko VA A. Twelve Wars for Ukraine. – Kharkov: Folio, 2006.
- Zhigalov I. Dybenko. The life of remarkable people. A series of biographies. Issue 18. M., "The Young Guard." 1983.
