= Nykyfor Hryhoriv =

Ukrainian military leader (1884–1919)

Otaman Nykyfor Hryhoriv
- Никифор Григор'ів
- Hryhoriv in 1919
- Born: Nykyfor Oleksandrovych Servetnyk; 21 February 1884; Dunaivtsi, Russian Empire (now Ukraine)
- Died: 27 July 1919 (aged 35); Sentove, Ukrainian People's Republic
- Military career
- Allegiance: Russian Empire (1904–1917); Ukrainian People's Republic (1917–1918, 1918–1919); Ukrainian State (1918); Ukrainian SSR (February–May 1919); Borotbists (May–July 1919)
- Service: Imperial Russian Army (1910–1917); Ukrainian People's Army (1917–1919); Ukrainian Soviet Army (February–May 1919); Peasant Division (May–July 1919)
- Service years: 1904–1919
- Rank: Ensign (1914); Staff Captain (1917); Lieutenant colonel (1917–1919); Division commander (1919)
- Commands: 56th Zhytomyr Infantry Regiment (1917); Ukrainian Kherson Division (1917–1919); 1st Trans-Dnepr Brigade (February–April 1919); 6th Ukrainian Soviet Division (April–May 1919); Peasant Division (May–July 1919)
- Conflicts: Russo-Japanese War; World War I; Eastern Front; Ukrainian War of Independence; Anti-Hetman Uprising; Katerynoslav March; 1919 Soviet invasion of Ukraine; Southern Russia Intervention; Hryhoriv Uprising

Nykyfor Oleksandrovych Hryhoriv (Note: Ukrainian: Ники́фор Олекса́ндрович Григо́р'єв), or Nikifor Aleksandrovich Grigoryev (Note: Russian: Ники́фор Алекса́ндрович Григо́рьев), real surname Servetnyk; 21 February [O.S. 9 February] 1884 – 27 July 1919) was a Ukrainian military leader noted for repeatedly switching sides during the Ukrainian War of Independence and Soviet-Ukrainian war. He is today considered one of the most influential rebel leaders of the Otamanshchyna phenomenon.

== Biography ==
Nykyfor Oleksandrovych Servetnyk was born February 9 (OS)/21 (NS), 1884 in the small village of Dunaivtsi, in the Podillia Governorate of the Russian Empire (today in Khmelnytskyi Oblast, Ukraine). He studied at a feldsher school, but interrupted his studies to volunteer for the Imperial Russian Army and fight in the Russo-Japanese War. After demobilization, he worked in Oleksandriia as an excise officer. During World War I, he was initially a praporshchik in the 56th Zhytomyr Infantry Regiment, eventually rising to the rank of staff captain and awarded the Order of St. George. During this time, he changed his surname to the nom de guerre Hryhoriv.

=== Revolution ===
After the February Revolution and the overthrow of the tsar, Hryhoriv was active in the military committees. He then deserted from the army and returned to Oleksandriia. At the end of 1917, he created a volunteer regiment of the Ukrainian People's Army, for which he received the rank of lieutenant colonel from Symon Petliura. Petliura also instructed him to create more units in Yelysavethrad. Hryhoriv initially supported the seizure of power by Pavlo Skoropadskyi and the establishment of the Ukrainian State, under the protection of the Central Powers. But he later founded a peasant detachment to fight against the new regime and re-established contact with Petliura.

In November 1918, as the Imperial German and Austrian armies were withdrawing from Ukraine, an anti-Skoropadskyi uprising broke out in the Dnieper basin. The Directory headed by Volodymyr Vynnychenko and Symon Petliura came to power. The troops under the command of Hryhoriv captured Verbluzhka and Oleksandriia, after which he declared himself the otaman of the insurgent forces of "the land of Kherson, Zaporizhzhia and Taurida", although he actually controlled only Kherson. Hryhoriv's 6,000-strong force rejoined the Ukrainian People's Army as a separate division under the command of otaman Oleksander Hrekov, but his command over these units was limited.

=== In the ranks of the Red Army ===
Following the 1919 Soviet invasion of Ukraine, the Directorate lost control over much of Ukraine and Hryhoriv decided to join the side of the victorious Bolsheviks, as Petliura had not allowed him to attack the Allied intervention forces landing in Odesa. On 2 February 1919, more than a month after the proclamation of the Ukrainian Soviet Socialist Republic in Kharkiv and three days before the capture of Kyiv by the Red Army, Hryhoriv agreed to recognize the suzerainty of the government of the Ukrainian SSR and the command of the Red Army in Ukraine. He also agreed to transform his troops into regular units. The units commanded by him took the name of the 1st Trans-Dnieper Brigade and in a short time forced the forces loyal to the Directorate to withdraw from Kryvyi Rih, Znamianka and Yelizavethrad. Hryhoriv's move to the side of the Red Army forced the Ukrainian People's Army to withdraw to Podolia and Volhynia.

On 2–10 March 1919, Hryhoriv fought a fierce, ultimately victorious battle for Kherson against the Allied interventionists. Then, on 15 March, acting against the orders of the Ukrainian Front's commander Vladimir Antonov-Ovseyenko, he captured Mykolaiv, which was actually controlled by the local Bolsheviks. On 6 April 1919, Hryhoriv's brigade captured Odesa, which had been abandoned the day before by French intervention troops. On the spot, Hryhoriv allowed his troops to commit looting and transport the stolen goods to their place of origin.

=== Anti-Bolshevik Uprising ===
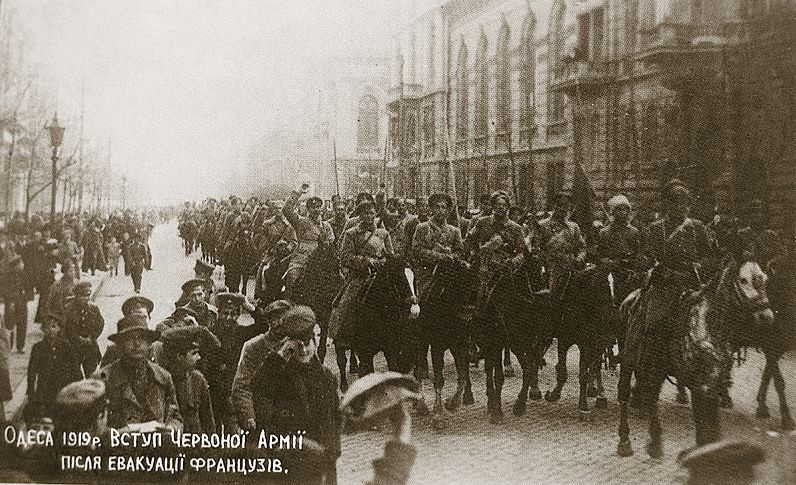
Hryhoriv's cavalry forces enter Odesa after the French military evacuated the city, April 1919

The successes achieved by Hryhoriv meant that, after the capture of Odesa, he was appointed commander of the newly established 6th Ukrainian Soviet Division, and he was proposed to be awarded the Order of the Red Banner. At the same time, his attitude and the conduct of his troops aroused increasing criticism among local Bolshevik commanders, especially when Hryhoriv unexpectedly did not support Mykola Khudyakov's troops on their march towards Tiraspol. Vladimir Antonov-Ovseenko, fearing for both Hryhoriv's loyalty and that of Nestor Makhno's anarchists, decided to entrust him with the prestigious task of marching against Romanian forces in Bessarabia. During a meeting with Antonov-Ovseenko, Hryhoriv attacked the policy of the Bolshevik authorities in Ukraine, particularly food requisitions, but ultimately committed to leading his troops in towards Bessarabia.

However, Hryhoriv actually sent his troops for a three-week "rest", allowing the soldiers to return to their places of origin. His brigade scattered throughout Kherson, taking weapons, equipment and supplies, and for the next three weeks his soldiers engaged in looting. They also committed antisemitic pogroms and murdered activists of local party committees. Hryhoriv's troops then stopped recognizing the Bolshevik command. They began to distribute leaflets, which called on peasants to fight against the Bolsheviks in the ranks of "otaman Hryhoriv's partisans". In Yelizavethrad, Hryhoriv's troops destroyed the party headquarters and disarmed a Red battalion. On 8 May 1919, Hryhoriv issued the Universal, in which he called for "the Ukrainian people to take power into their own hands" and proclaimed "the dictatorship of the working people, the power of the people's councils of Ukraine." He called for the organization of village, district and governorate councils, with 80% of seats reserved for Ukrainians, 5% for Jews and 15% for other ethnic minorities in each, admitting representatives of all parties and non-party people that supported the concept of council power. He gained some support from the peasants, who turned against the Bolsheviks, refusing to accept forced food requisitions and repressions by the Cheka.

At the beginning of May, Hryhoriv's armed forces seized the area between Mykolaiv, Katerynoslav, Kremenchuk and Cherkasy. At the same time, Katerynoslav was handed over to the otaman by the Black Sea Regiment of sailor Orlov, until then fighting on the side of the Reds. Hryhoriv was also joined by sailors in Mykolaiv and Ochakiv, and even found some support in Podolia. At its peak, he commanded 15–23,000 people. On 10 May, the defense council of the Ukrainian SSR declared Hryhoriv to be an outlaw. On 15 May 1919, Red troops under the command of Oleksandr Parkhomenko recaptured Katerynoslav, but then they were quickly driven out of it again. Nevertheless, after the first clashes with the Red Army, Hryhoriv's troops began to surrender or return to the Reds' command. The main grouping of Hryhoriv's forces was defeated in battle at Kamianka. By the end of May 1919, Hryhoriv's rebellion was suppressed by the Red Army, the area he occupied was again under the control of the Bolsheviks, and the forces led by him shrunk to 3,000. However, his uprising had led to the collapse of the Ukrainian Front of the Red Army, contributed to the defeat of the Reds by the Armed Forces of South Russia in the Battle for the Donbas, and prevented the Red Army from marching further towards Bessarabia in support of the Hungarian Soviet Republic.

=== Attempted alliance with Makhno and murder ===
Hryhoriv's supporters managed to hold on to Beryslav, Kakhovka and Nikopol for some time, attacking military transports going to Crimea and raiding towards Oleksandriia. Looking for support in his fight against the Bolsheviks, the otaman established contacts with Makhno. The two insurgent leaders eventually organized a meeting in Kompaniivka, and, after a day of negotiations, agreed to unify their forces, with Hryhoriv heading the united army and Makhno becoming head of the joint revolutionary council. However, Hryhoriv's reluctance to fight Denikin's White Army made him unable to stop the advance of general Andrei Shkuro's forces, disrupting Makhno's plans. The otaman's forces were also widely accused of perpetrating pogroms against the local Jews, which made him unpopular among the public. Hryhoriv considered going over to the side of the Whites and subordinating himself to Anton Denikin, which the Makhnovists considered a betrayal.

After receiving numerous complaints about Hryhoriv's actions, on 27 July 1919 Makhno arrived for a new meeting with the otaman in the village of Sentove, having previously ordered his cavalry to surround the settlement. During the talks, Makhno's aide publicly accused Hryhoriv of being a "tsarist servant" and "counterrevolutionary". According to eyewitnesses, in the following altercation, Hryhoriv took out his revolver and attempted to escape, but was shot numerous times by Makhno's guards and died soon thereafter. In the process, one of the otaman's guards had unsuccessfully attempted to shoot Makhno, but failed. After Hryhoriv's death, Makhno reportedly telegraphed the news of his killing to Moscow. The otaman's followers were disarmed, and many of them eventually joined Makhno's forces.

== See also ==
- Danylo Terpylo
- Green armies
- Mishka Yaponchik

== Bibliography ==
- Adams, Arthur (1963). Bolsheviks in the Ukraine. The Second Campaign, 1918–1919. New Haven: Yale University Press. OCLC 406299.
- Darch, Colin (2020). Nestor Makhno and Rural Anarchism in Ukraine, 1917–1921. London: Pluto Press. pp. 39–72. ISBN 9781786805263. OCLC 1225942343.
- Footman, David (1961). "Makhno". Civil War in Russia. Praeger Publications in Russian History and World Communism. Vol. 114. New York: Praeger. pp. 270–274. LCCN 62-17560. OCLC 254495418.
- Kenez, Peter (2004). Red Advance, White Defeat. Civil War in South Russia 1919–1920. Washington DC: New Academia Publishing. ISBN 0974493457.
- Malet, Michael (1982). Nestor Makhno in the Russian Civil War. London: Palgrave Macmillan. ISBN 978-0-333-25969-6. OCLC 8514426.
- Mawdsley, Evan (2010). Wojna domowa w Rosji 1917–1920 (in Polish). Warsaw: Bellona. ISBN 978-83-11-11638-2. OCLC 750846354.
- Mishina, A.V. (2006). "Н.А. Григорьев - Атаман повстанцев Херсонщины" [N. A. Hryhoriv - Otaman of the Kherson insurgents]. New Historical Bulletin (in Russian). 1 (15). Moscow: Ippolitov Publishing House: 1–7. ISSN 2072-9286. OCLC 844626269.
- Palij, Michael (1976). "Nykyfor Hryhor'iv". The Anarchism of Nestor Makhno, 1918–1921: An Aspect of the Ukrainian Revolution. Publications on Russia and Eastern Europe. Seattle: University of Washington Press. pp. 160–174. ISBN 978-0-295-95511-7. OCLC 81941010.
- Peters, Victor (1970). Nestor Makhno: The Life of an Anarchist. Winnipeg: Echo Books. pp. 60–73. OCLC 7925080.
- Senkus, Roman (1989). "Hryhoriv, Nykyfor". In Kubijovyč, Volodymyr (ed.). Encyclopedia of Ukraine. Vol. 2. doi:10.3138/9781442632813. ISBN 9781442632813. OCLC 1165480101.
- Shubin, Aleksandr (2010). "The Makhnovist Movement and the National Question in the Ukraine, 1917–1921". In Hirsch, Steven J.; van der Walt, Lucien (eds.). Anarchism and Syndicalism in the Colonial and Postcolonial World, 1870–1940. Studies in Global Social History. Vol. 6. Leiden: Brill. pp. 147–191. ISBN 9789004188495. OCLC 868808983.
- Skirda, Alexandre (2004) [1982]. Nestor Makhno–Anarchy's Cossack: The Struggle for Free Soviets in the Ukraine 1917–1921. Translated by Sharkey, Paul. Oakland: AK Press. ISBN 978-1-902593-68-5. OCLC 60602979.
- Smele, J. D. (2015). The "Russian" Civil Wars 1916-1926. Ten Years That Shook the World. London: C. Hurst & Co. ISBN 9781849047210.
