= 15th Landwehr Division =

- 15. Landwehr-Division
- Active: World War I
- Country: German Empire
- Allegiance: Imperial German Army

The 15th Landwehr Division (15. Landwehr-Division) was a unit of the Prussian Army, part of Imperial German Army in World War I.

The 15th Landwehr Division was stranded in Mykolayiv until March 1919, and evacuated under pressure from Hryhoriev's partisans.
