= 60th Rifle Division (RSFSR) =

Soviet Russian military unit (1919–1921)

- Red Army insignia of the Civil War period
- Active: July 1919–April 1921
- Country: Russian Soviet Federated Socialist Republic
- Branch: Red Army
- Type: Infantry
- Engagements: Russian Civil War; Polish–Soviet War

The 60th Rifle Division (Russian: 60-я стрелковая дивизия) was an infantry division of the Red Army during the Russian Civil War.

Formed in mid-1919 as the 6th Consolidated Rifle Division but soon redesignated, it fought against the Ukrainian People's Army on the Southern Front, retreating north and taking heavy losses. In late 1919 it advanced southwest into western Ukraine, where it fought in the Polish–Soviet War as part of the Southwestern Front in 1920. Postwar, the division was reduced to a brigade and merged into the 24th Rifle Division in April 1921.

== History ==
The division was formed by orders of 20 and 25 July 1919 with the 14th Army as the 6th Consolidated Rifle Division from the 1st and 2nd Consolidated and 1st Ural Brigades. It was renumbered as the 60th Rifle Division on 10 August, and fought in defensive battles against the Ukrainian People's Army on the left-bank of the Dnieper near Kremenchug, Zolotonosha, Yagotin, Darnitsa, Brovary, and Kozelets during August. It left the 14th Army on 14 August, being reduced to a rifle brigade due to heavy losses in September. The brigade was restored to division strength on 16 September with the personnel of the 2nd Penza and Kiev Fortress Brigades, joining the 12th Army on 16 September.

It fought against the Ukrainian People's Army on the Desna between September and November. From November to February 1920 it fought in the recapture of Chernigov, Bakhmach, Cherkassy, and Kremenchug. The division transferred back to the 14th Army of the Southwestern Front on 13 February, and fought in the battles near Zhmerynka and Vapniarka until April. It defended the line of the Zbruch and the Seret between May and August during the Polish–Soviet War. On 30 November the division briefly returned to the 12th Army as the 14th Army disbanded, but on 25 December joined the Kiev Military District after the former was itself disbanded. On 28 April 1921, by an order of the Kiev Military District, it was reduced to a brigade, which was incorporated into the 24th Rifle Division.

== Commanders ==
The following commanders led the division:

- D.A. Gebel (acting; 25 July–15 August 1919)
- P.K. Marmuzov (15–20 August 1919)
- G.F. Martynenko (20 August–7 September 1919)
- A.K. Nikolayenko (acting; 7–11 September 1919)
- N.G. Krapivyansky (11 September 1919–18 January 1920)
- D.D. Pomazkin (18 January–7 March 1920)
- P.S. Ivanov (7 March–6 October 1920)
- L.F. Kryuchkovsky (6 October 1920–21 April 1921)
