= 14th Army (RSFSR) =

- Red Army insignia of the Civil War period
- Active: June 1919–January 1921
- Country: Russian Soviet Federative Socialist Republic
- Branch: Red Army
- Type: Field army
- Engagements: Russian Civil War; Polish–Soviet War; Ukrainian–Soviet War

Commanders
- Notable commanders: Kilment Voroshilov; Alexander Yegorov; Ieronim Uborevich; Iona Yakir

The 14th Army (Russian: 14-я армия) was a field army of the Red Army during the Russian Civil War era.

== History ==
The army was formed under the command of Kliment Voroshilov by an order of the Revolutionary Military Council on 4 June 1919 from the 2nd Ukrainian Soviet Army, part of the Southern Front. It initially included the 7th Ukrainian Rifle Division, and the Crimean Soviet Army was subordinated to it until July. From June, the army fought in fierce defense battles with the White Armed Forces of South Russia, and in its rear with the anarchist Revolutionary Insurrectionary Army of Ukraine in the Donbas and Left-Bank Ukraine towards Yekaterinoslav, Poltava, and Sumy. On 26 June, the army became part of the Ukrainian Group of Forces of the Southern Front alongside the 12th Army, although this organization was abolished on 26 July after the latter was directly subordinated to the Commander-in-Chief. On 7 July, the 7th Ukrainian Soviet Division was disbanded, and during the month the 41st and 57th Rifle Divisions joined the army, while the 58th Rifle Division was formed from the Crimean Rifle Division, itself formed from the Crimean Soviet Army. The 46th and 60th Rifle Divisions became part of the army in August, though the 60th was transferred within the month. In September, the 7th Rifle Division and the 8th Cavalry Division joined the army.

The army fought in the Orel–Kursk operation in October and November, launching the main attack and taking Kromy, Fatezh, Lgov, and Kursk. During the operation, on 14 October, the 13th Army shock group (including the Latvian Rifle Division, the Red Cossack Cavalry Brigade, and P.A. Pavlov's Separate Rifle Brigade), created to launch the main attack, was transferred to the 14th Army after a White attack cut it off from the rest of the 13th Army. The Estonian Rifle Division joined the army in the same month, but was transferred before its end. In November, the 7th and 57th Rifle Divisions and the 8th Cavalry Division were transferred and replaced by the 5th and 45th Rifle Divisions. The shock group was disbanded on 28 November after the Soviet victory.

In the offensive of the Southern and Southeastern Fronts in late 1919 and early 1920, the army fought in the Kharkov operation, the Donbas operation, and the Pavlograd-Ekaterinoslav Operation, during which it captured Yekaterinoslav. The 14th Army cut off the left flank group of the Volunteer Army from the rest of the Volunteer Army in December and January 1920 in the Berdyansk Operation, reaching the Sea of Azov. The 5th Division was transferred in December, and the 42nd Rifle Division was part of the army during January 1920, with the 46th Division transferring during the month. On 10 January 1920, in accordance with an order issued four days earlier, it became part of the Southwestern Front when the Southern Front was reorganized. The 60th Division rejoined the army in February, and the 45th and Latvian Divisions transferred in March. In February and March, the army captured Odessa, Tiraspol, and Right-bank Ukraine in the Odessa operation.

In April, the 44th and 45th Rifle Divisions joined the army. In May, the 44th and 45th Divisions transferred and the 8th Cavalry Division rejoined the army. The army fought in defensive battles against Polish troops in the Polish–Soviet War during April and May. In June, the 44th and 45th Divisions rejoined the army, with the 47th Rifle Division also joining the army. From June to August the army fought in the Lvov operation, attacking in the area of Gaysin, Vinnytsia and Proskurov. In July, the 47th Rifle and 8th Cavalry Divisions transferred. In August, the 45th and 47th Rifle and 8th Cavalry Divisions returned to the army, alongside the 24th Rifle Division. The army failed to capture Lvov due to the Polish victory in the war. In October, the 8th Cavalry was transferred and the 24th Rifle was transferred in November. In November, the army fought against the remnants of the Ukrainian Army in the area of Proskurov and Kamenets-Podolsk. During the month the 12th and 55th Rifle Divisions joined the army. In December, the 12th, 41st, 45th, 47th, 55th, and 60th Divisions transferred out of the army, while the 58th Division was briefly part of it. On 5 January 1921, the army was disbanded.

== Commanders ==
The army was led by the following commanders during its existence:

- Kliment Voroshilov (7 June–8 July 1919)
- Semyon Aralov (acting, 18–29 July 1919)
- Alexander Yegorov (29 July–6 October 1919)
- Ieronim Uborevich (5 October 1919–24 February 1920)
- Pavel Marmuzov (25 February–17 April 1920)
- Ieronim Uborevich (17 April–7 July 1920)
- Mikhail Molkochanov (8 July–27 September 1920)
- Matvei Vasilenko (27 September–15 November 1920)
- Ieronim Uborevich (15 November–15 December 1920)
- Iona Yakir (15 December 1920–6 January 1921)
