= Mityakinskaya =

Mityakinskaya Митякинская
- Location of Mityakinskaya
- Location of Mityakinskaya
- Coordinates: 48°36′34″N 39°47′2″E
- Country: Russia
- Federal subject: Rostov Oblast
- Time zone: UTC+3 (MSK)
- Postal code(s): 346092
- OKTMO ID: 60653445101

Mitakinskaya is a stanitsa in the Tarasovsky District of Rostov Oblast, Russia.

== Geography ==
The stanitsa is located on the left bank of the Donets, bordered by Ukraine to the west.

== History ==
Mitakinskaya was founded in 1549 by the Don Cossacks people and was formally part of the Donetsk district in Don Host Oblast. In 1917 the village had 28,000 people.

On 21 February 2022, during the Russo-Ukrainian War, Russia claimed that five Ukrainian saboteurs were killed by Russian soldiers in Mitakinskaya.
