= Innokentiy Kozhevnikov =

Innokentiy Serafimovich Kozhevnikov
- Иннокентий Серафимович Кожевников
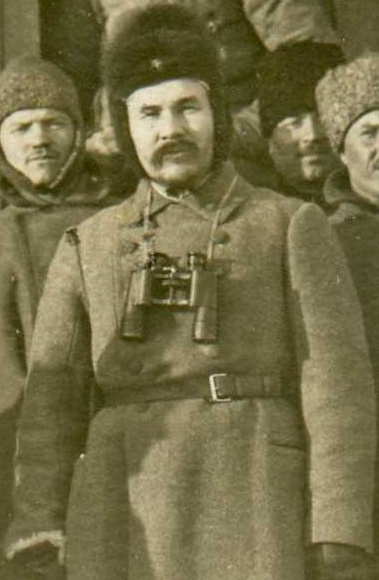
- Innokentiy Kozhevnikov in 1918
- Born: November 13, 1879; Bochkarevo
- Died: April 15, 1931 (aged 51); Moscow, USSR

Innokentiy Serafimovich Kozhevnikov (Russian: Инноке́нтий Серафи́мович Коже́вников; 13 November 1879– 15 April 1931) was an active participant in the Russian Civil War. A member of the Bolshevik Party since 1917, he was one of the organizers of the guerrilla struggle in the rear of the White Army. He became commander of the 13th Red Army. He was imprisoned in 1926 and executed in 1931.

== Biography ==
He was born in a peasant family in Bochkarevo, now in the Kirensky District of the Irkutsk Oblast. He found an opportunity to study at the Kharkov Commercial Institute. In 1915–17, he served as a mechanic at the Kharkov Telegraph Office. At the outbreak of the October Revolution of 1917, Kozhevnikov became a member of the Communist Party and was soon appointed commissar of the Kharkiv postal and telegraph district. In February 1918, he became an extraordinary commissioner for five southern postal and telegraph districts, and from May to September 1918, Kozhevnikov became extraordinary commissar for communications of the entire Donets-Krivoy Rog Soviet Republic.

In August 1918, the Revolutionary Military Council decided to send an expeditionary partisan detachment to the rear of the White Guard troops on the Eastern Front. In September 1918, Kozhevnikov was chosen to organize the partisan struggle in Tatarstan and Bashkortostan. The detachment of Kozhevnikov, formed mainly from volunteers of the Kursk, Nizhny Novgorod and Astrakhan postal and telegraph districts, numbered initially some 500 men. By November 1918, his detachment already had 12,000 men and became known as the Partisan Red Army.

In early December 1918, an order was sent from Moscow to redeploy the Partisan Army through the Bugulma railway station to the Southern Front and concentrate it in the area of Novy Oskol in the Kursk province. In January 1919, Kozhevnikov detachments numbered more than 30,000 men who fought in the battles for Kupyansk, Starobelsk and Lugansk. Soon on the basis of these forces, the 13th Red Army was formed under the command of Kozhevnikov. The bulk of the army's personnel consisted of natives of Tatarstan. In a telegram, Yakov Sverdlov reported in February 1919: "In the Kozhevnikov army there are over 10,000 Muslims". On April 16, 1919, he was replaced by Anatoliy Gekker at the head of the 13th Army.

In 1920, Kozhevnikov served in the Volga–Caspian Military Flotilla, as commissar of the detachment. In May 1921, Kozhevnikov sent an emissary to the Primorsky Krai for the organization of the partisan movement. In 1922–23, Kozhevnikov became Ambassador in the Bukharan People's Soviet Republic and to Lithuania, and in 1924–1926, worked in the People's Commissariat for Posts and Telegraphs of the USSR.

Kozhevnikov's career ended on January 21, 1926, when he was arrested by the OGPU and sent to the Solovki prison camp. At Solovki, there was a camp for juvenile offenders (for children aged 12–16), of which prisoner Kozhevnikov became the director. In 1931, Kozhevnikov fled the camp, but was soon caught and severely beaten. He was examined by a commission of psychiatrists, which concluded that Kozhevnikov was mentally paranoid. After that, Kozhevnikov was taken to Moscow and shot around April 15, 1931.
