= Ukrainian Front (1919) =

- Український фронт
- Active: January 4–June 15, 1919
- Country: Ukraine
- Allegiance: Ukrainian SSR
- Branch: Red Army
- Size: c. 120,000
- Engagements: Soviet-Ukrainian War

Commanders
- Notable commanders: Vladimir Antonov-Ovseyenko

The Ukrainian Front, formerly the Army Group of Kursk Direction, was a Red Army group (later front) during the Russian Civil War, which existed between January and June 1919. The army group was created to invade Ukraine after the withdrawal of the Austrian-German occupation force in November 1918 and to fight the Ukrainian People's Republic, as well as the troops of the Entente which had landed on the Black Sea coast.

The army group was primarily based on two insurgent divisions that were created on September 22, 1918, by the order #6 of All-Ukrainian Central Military Revolutionary Committee and were part of the Red Army Reserve Front at the Oryol Military District. The reserve front was originally commissioned under Commandarm Vasily Glagolev and members of revolutionary military council Viyshnevetsky and Zusmanovich.

== Army Group of Kursk Direction ==
On November 17, 1918, the Revolutionary Military Council consisting of Stalin, Yuri Pyatakov, Volodymyr Zatonsky, and Vladimir Antonov-Ovseyenko established the Army Group of Kursk Direction. The name was chosen by the newly appointed commander-in-chief of all Armed Forces of Republic Jukums Vācietis (since September 1, 1918).

The 1st Ukrainian Insurgent Division and the 2nd Ukrainian Insurgent Division in December 1918 were renamed into Soviet divisions. It was planned also to add to the army group the Moscow Worker's Division, the 43rd Worker's Regiment, the 2nd Oryol Cavalry Division as well as the formations of Innokentiy Kozhevnikov from Ufa. The most of them however were redirected to the Southern Front. The Moscow Military District also sent the Moscow Reserve Artillery Brigade and its leading military personnel. Officially Innokentiy Kozhevnikov became the commander of the army group, but the major work in organizing the army group was conducted by Vladimir Antonov-Ovseyenko. By January 1919 he managed also to recruit several formations of border guards, two Cheka and two food regiments as well as several armored trains from Moscow. The army group was also joined by a number of international volunteer formations from Kazan and Oryol, the 1st Moscow Communist Squad, the Yashvili Company and Armenian Company, all of which accounted for some 1,000 of bayonets. The chairman of the Russian Revolutionary Military Council Leon Trotsky ordered on December 14, 1918, a mass recruitment of ethnic Ukrainians.

=== Military operations ===
On November 28, 1918, the All-Ukrainian Central Military Revolutionary Committee was transformed into the Provisional Workers-Peasants Government of Ukraine. On November 30, 1918 Vacietis was informed that the Ukrainian Revolutionary Military Council included Antonov, Sergeyev, and Zatonsky. By the end of December 1918 the army group successfully occupied the Chernigov Governorate and portions of the Kharkov Governorate.

On December 13, 1918, the 1st Insurgency Division took Klintsy and on December 25 - Novozybkov and Novhorod-Siversky. It met some resistance on December 25, 1918 near Hlukhiv and Shostka. Another of its groups took Vovchansk and Kupiansk on December 19, 1918.

After the withdrawal of the German forces from the borders, the 2nd Insurgent Division occupied Belgorod on December 21, 1918, and started to advance on Kharkiv. On December 28–30, 1918, the Ukrainian People's Army managed to halt their advance near Grayvoron and Kozacha Lopan. On January 2, 1919, Bolsheviks organized an uprising in Kharkiv. The local council of German soldiers supported the uprising and gave the Ukrainian forces an ultimatum to leave the city. On January 3, 1919, the Red Army occupied Kharkiv. The next day, the Army Group of Kursk Direction was reformed into the Ukrainian Front.

== Ukrainian Front ==
In November 1918 the White Russian Volunteer Army was in a strong position after it successfully secured the territory of Northern Caucasus and Kuban, as well as being supported by the Allied landings in Southern Ukraine.

After the formation of the Ukrainian Front on January 4, 1919, the Ukrainian Revolutionary Military Council consisted of Antonov, Kotsiubynsky, and Shchadenko. On January 13, 1919, as part of the Front the Army Group of Kharkiv Direction was created, which was based on the 2nd Ukrainian Soviet Division. On January 24, 1919, the People's Commissariat of Military Affairs was created as part of the Provisional Workers-Peasants Government of Ukraine, which on January 28 was renamed into the Council of People's Commissars of the Ukrainian Soviet Socialist Republic. On February 18, 1919, the Army Group of Kiev Direction was created, which was based on the 1st Ukrainian Soviet Division. In mid-February within the Army Group of Kharkiv Direction, there was a special group created, called the Army Group of Donetsk Direction which on March 5, 1919 was reorganized into the 13th Army led by Kozhevnikov. On April 14, 1919, the Central Executive Committee of the Ukrainian SSR ratified a military union with the Russian SFSR.

On April 15, 1919, all army groups were transformed into armies:

- 1st Ukrainian Soviet Army,
- 2nd Ukrainian Soviet Army,
- 3rd Ukrainian Soviet Army,
- Crimean Soviet Army.

On April 27, 1919 the 2nd Ukrainian Soviet Army was transferred under the jurisdiction of the Southern Front and on June 4, 1919 transformed into the 14th Army.

In June, the 1st Ukrainian and 3rd Ukrainian armies were transformed into the 12th Army and transferred to the Western Front.

The Crimean Soviet Army also joined the 14th Army at the Southern Front on June 4, 1919. On July 21, 1919 the Crimean Soviet Army was dissolved and transformed into the Crimean Rifle Division which in six days was renamed again into the 58th Rifle Division.

The Ukrainian front was abolished on June 15, 1919.

== Commanders ==
Commander

- Vladimir Antonov-Ovseyenko (4 January 1919 - 15 June 1919)

Members of the Revolutionary Military Council

- N.P. Vishnevetsky
- Yuriy Kotsiubynsky
- E.A. Shchadenko
- Andrei Bubnov
- S.M. Savitsky

Chief of staff

- Vasily Glagolev (4 January 1919 - 2 May 1919)
- A. I. Davydov (2 May 1919 - 12 May 1919)
- E. I. Babin (12 May 1919 - 15 June 1919)
