= 12th Army (RSFSR) =

The 12th Army was a field army of the Red Army during the Russian Civil War, which was formed twice.

== First formation ==
The 12th Army was formed on October 3, 1918, in the region of Astrakhan and the Eastern part of the Northern Caucasus. It was part of the Southern Front since November 3, 1918, and then of the Caspian-Caucasian Front, with which it fought the Northern Caucasus Operation (1918–1919), between December 8, 1918, and March 13, 1919, when it was disbanded.
It was composed of the 45th and 58th divisions.

== Second formation ==
On June 16, 1919, a new 12th Army was formed from the troops of the 1st and 3rd Ukrainian Soviet Army. It fought in Ukraine against Anton Denikin's Volunteer Army, and then against the troops of Symon Petliura, which it pushed back behind the Zbrucz River. Here it first encountered troops of the Polish Army.

It 1919, it was composed of the 44th, 47th, 58th and 60th divisions, as well as of the 9th Cavalry division. The advances of the Ukrainians and of The Volunteer Army forced the 12th Army Northward. By the end of august the situation in Ukraine was dire for the 12th army, the 45th, 47th and the 58th riffle divisons were encircled by the forces of Petilura and Denikin. A decission was made by the command of the 12th Army to start a march from Odessa to Kiev in order to avoid complete destruction.

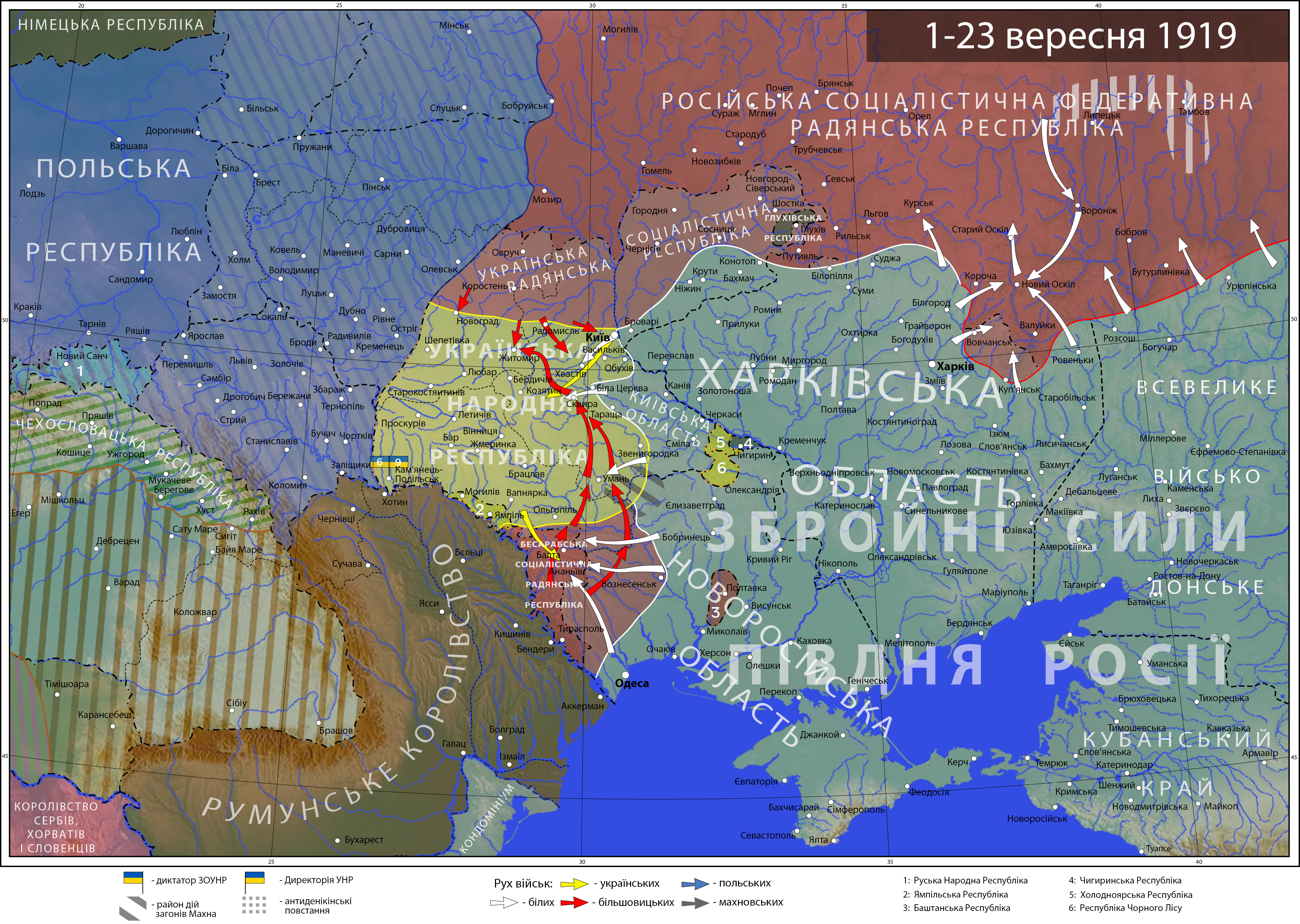
Map of the Campaign

This march would be successful and as a direct result of the operation the bolsheviks would defeat the forces of Petilura in the Battle of Zhytomyr (1919) and the bolsheviks were able to maintain their foothold in Ukraine despite losing Kiev only for them to retake it on December 10, after a 6-day long battle 4th Battle of Kiev to retake the city from the White Army

In the spring of 1920, as part of the Southwestern Front, the 12th Army was deployed against the Polish offensive in Ukraine and was pushed back over the Dnieper. In the counteroffensive of the Red Army in summer 1920, it reached the Bug River. At the end of the Polish-Soviet War, the 12th Army had suffered heavy losses and was disbanded on December 25, 1920.
It 1920, it was composed of the 7th, 44th, 47th, 58th divisions and 17th Cavalry division.

== Commanders ==
=== First formation ===
- Alexei Ivanovich Avtonomov (3 October - 15 November 1918), appointed but never took command,
- V.L. Stepanov (3 October 1918 - 14 February 1919),
- Nikolai Zhdanov (14 February - 13 March 1919).

=== Second formation ===
- Nikolai Semyonov (16 June — 8 September 1919),
- Sergei Mezheninov (10 September 1919 — 10 June 1920),
- Gaspar Voskanyan (10 June — 20 August 1920),
- Nikolai Kuzmin (20 August — 26 October 1920),
- Nikolai Lisovsky (26 October — 25 December 1920).
