= Pavel Dybenko =

Ukrainian revolutionary and Soviet komandarm (1889–1938)

- Павел Ефимович Дыбенко (Russian)
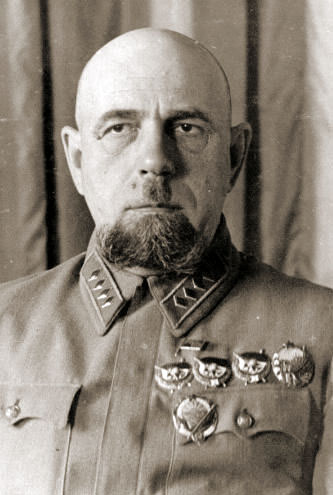
- Born: 16 February 1889; Novozybkovsky Uyezd, Chernigov Governorate, Russian Empire
- Died: 29 July 1938 (aged 49); Kommunarka, Leninsky District, Moscow, Russian SFSR, Soviet Union
- Military career
- Allegiance: Russian Empire (1911–1917); Soviet Russia (1917–1922); Soviet Union (1922–1938)
- Branch: Imperial Russian Navy; Red Army; Soviet Navy
- Service years: 1911–1938
- Rank: Komandarm 2nd rank
- Commands: Baltic Fleet; Crimean Soviet Army; Central Asian Military District; Siberian Military District; Volga Military District; Leningrad Military District
- Conflicts: First World War; Russian Civil War
- Awards: (×3)
- Other work: Russian Social Democratic Labour Party (Bolsheviks) (1912–1918); All-Union Communist Party (b) (1918–1938)

Signature
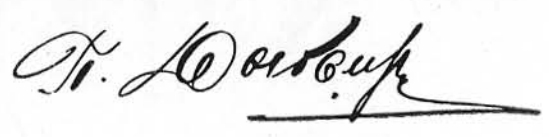

Pavel Efimovich Dybenko (Russian: Па́вел Ефи́мович Дыбе́нко; Ukrainian: Павло́ Юхи́мович Дибе́нко, romanized: Pavlo Yukhymovych Dybenko; 16 February 1889 – 29 July 1938) was a Bolshevik revolutionary and a leading Soviet officer and military commander. He was arrested, tortured and executed during the Great Purge and subsequently posthumously politically rehabilitated during the Khrushchev Thaw.

== Early life ==
Pavel Dybenko was born in Lyudkovo village, Novozybkov uyezd, Chernigov guberniya, Imperial Russia (now Novozybkov, Bryansk Oblast, Russia) into a Russian peasant family. He was one of six children raised on an eight-acre farm. His parents owned one horse and one cow. In 1907 he started working in the local Treasury department, but was fired as "untrustworthy" due to his political activities. From 1907 onward, Dybenko became active in a Bolshevik group, distributing revolutionary literature, such as the People’s Gazette and the Proletariat, which spoke to anti-Tsar sympathies, throughout the Novozybkov region.

He moved to Riga and worked as a port labourer. He tried to avoid enlisting, but was arrested and forcibly enlisted.

== Early military career ==
In November 1911, he joined the Baltic Fleet. The first six months he served on the ship "Dvina".

The "Dvina" was used by the Navy as a training vessel for the new recruits at Kronstadt. Formerly known as the Pamiat Azova, its sailors were veterans of the 1906 revolutionary actions.

In 1912 he joined the Bolshevik Party. In 1915, he participated in the mutiny on board of the battleship Emperor Paul I. He was imprisoned for six months and sent as an infantry soldier to the German front. There he went on with anti-war propaganda, and was again imprisoned for six months.

He was released after the February 1917 revolution and returned to the Baltic Fleet. In April 1917, he became the leader of the Tsentrobalt.

== October Revolution ==
Dybenko was appointed the People's Commissar (minister) of naval affairs. (Dybenko was appointed by the Congress of Soviets) Lenin assigned to him an assistant, an ex-tsarist admiral who helped manage the professional affairs of the Navy.

On February 18, 1918, the German army advanced towards Petrograd. The Soviet government sent Dybenko to defend Petrograd with the Baltic Fleet. Pavel Dybenko then went to Helsingfors to recruit sailors to meet the German Advance. The Northern Flying Unit with its commander Pavlov answered the plea. They had just returned after having led a successful campaign against Ataman Dutov and his Cossack division at Orenburg.

The later communist propaganda claimed that revolutionary mariners achieved a great victory there on February 23, 1918. February 23 was declared "The birthday of the Red Army". This day is celebrated in Russia to this day as a national holiday. A special military decoration, "20 years to the Soviet Army" was instituted for this occasion in February 1938. However, this medal was never given to Dybenko himself.

The truth is that Dybenko and his mariners fled the field. According to the memoirs of Bonch-Bruyevich, the mariners came by a barrel of pure alcohol and consumed it. Their whereabouts were unknown for at least a month. Lenin wrote in his famous article on 25 February 1918, in Pravda evening edition: A lesson humiliating but necessary : "Refused to fight,... refused to defend the Narva line,...failed to destroy everything as they retreated..."

Lenin added: From the point of view of the defence of the fatherland it would be a crime to enter into an armed conflict with an infinitely superior and well-prepared enemy when we obviously have no army.... implying that Dybenko and his mariners definitely were not an army.

The government issued an order to arrest Dybenko and to deliver him to Moscow, that he might face court martial. His command was taken over by General Parsky. The Germans were in fact stopped by the ex-Tsarist general Aleksandr Panfilovich Nikolayev, who organized some retreating Russian soldiers to fight.

The defeat at Narva caused the Bolshevik government to sign the Treaty of Brest-Litovsk. Another outcome was the transfer of the Bolshevik capital from Petrograd to Moscow.

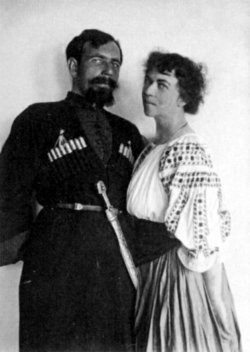
Dybenko with his wife Alexandra Kollontai during his service in the Ukrainian Soviet Army

In April 1918, he was dismissed from the government, expelled from the communist party and put to trial for cowardice. Unexpectedly, the court martial declared him innocent, since "Being no military expert, he was absolutely neither competent nor trained for the task,... he was not prepared to fight...".

Dybenko strongly opposed the Brest-Litovsk peace, and tried to organize mariners to act against it. He was arrested.

According to the testimony of Jacques Sadoul, a French socialist who was present then in Moscow and wrote memoirs about this period, it was Dybenko's fellow mariners who saved him. They threatened to open fire on the Kremlin and terrorized Bolshevik government members. The intervention of his wife Alexandra Kollontai, then a People's Commissar of social affairs, also played a role.

In April 1918, Dybenko arrived in Samara, a city governed by local Left Socialist Revolutionary party, along with Anarchists and some other non-Bolshevik groups, all opposing Bolsheviks and the Brest-Litovsk peace. Dybenko soon headed the local opposition and from that remote town he published letters accusing Lenin of corruption, stealing 90 tons of gold, incompetence, terrorism, and of being a German agent.

The Samara opposition groups planned an armed revolt on May 15, 1918. However, one week prior to that date, Dybenko reappeared in Moscow. There he was pardoned and spared punishment, on the condition that he would never again meddle in politics. The Samara revolt was crushed by Bolshevik forces.

== Russian Civil War ==
Dybenko left Moscow. In order to keep him as far as possible from the Baltic Navy, Lenin gave him a low-rank military job, as a battalion commander, at the "No-man's land" between Russia and Ukraine. Ukraine was occupied by the German army as the outcome of the Brest peace, and after the German capitulation and retreat of the German army, the situation there devolved into a chaotic "war of all against all".

In the winter 1918, Dybenko's troops conquered some towns near the Russian-Ukraine border in the Kharkov (now Kharkiv) district. Dybenko tried then to cooperate with non-Bolshevik leftist political forces, especially with the Left SR, but also with Maximalists and Anarchists, all having some military forces. However, this attempt brought no results. The non-Bolshevik troops were disarmed.

In the beginning of 1919, Dybenko unexpectedly received a general-rank appointment as the commander of the Red Army forces which invaded Ukraine, in particularly, the 1st Trans-Dniepr division. This division had 10000 soldiers, and included the anarchist brigades of Makhno and Hryhoriv. Trotsky selected him for this role because of his Ukrainian name and origin. It could help the Bolsheviks to pretend it was just another military force acting in the Ukrainian chaos, rather than an "official invasion".

During the spring of 1919, Dybenko's forces destroyed all non-Bolshevik political forces in Ukraine. In Ekaterinoslav (current Dnipro), he arrested and executed all S.R. activists. In Zaporizhia he executed the members of the local Soviet, the elected local authority. The Dybenko troops supplied their own needs robbing both the local population, and the trains carrying coal and provisions to Russia.

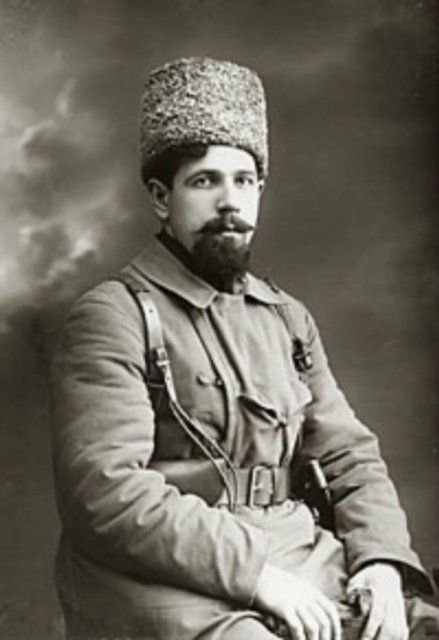
Dybenko in 1930

In April 1919 Dybenko disregarded the orders of his superiors and invaded Crimea, instead of moving his forces into the eastern Ukraine (Donbas). As a result of this insubordination, the White army conquered Donbas and later in August to December 1919 conquered the rest of Ukraine, other than Crimea.

Dybenko created what he called "The Crimean Soviet Army", with 9000 men, independent from the Ukrainian Front. He created the Crimean Socialist Soviet Republic, and invited Lenin's brother Dmitry Ulianov, to be the prime minister there. Kollontai also joined him. For himself he reserved the appointment of the Army-and-Navy minister.

The regime which Dybenko established in Crimea was called "Dybenkism" by the leading Bolsheviks. By "Dybenkism" they meant some combination of anarchy, tyranny, and banditry. Trotsky said then that the whole Crimean Army was infected by Dybenkism and stopped supplies to it. During his short reign, Dybenko terrorised national minorities in Crimea.

The Crimean Socialist Soviet Republic was rather short-lived. Soon Crimea was reoccupied by Denikin. Dybenko fled to Ukraine, losing his army. Some of his soldiers deserted to Makhno's forces, while others became independent bands fighting against the Red army and the White army simultaneously.

In September 1919 Dybenko appeared in Moscow and entered the Red Army Academy. After one month he was appointed the commander of the Division No. 37, and sent to fight against the advancing white army at Tsaritsyn and Tula. He was court-martialed for unjustified executions of soldiers of his, but was found not guilty.

In March 1920 Dybenko was appointed commander of the Caucasian cavalry division, and in May 1920 given the Horseback division #2 of the Southern front. Due to Dybenko's lack of experience in cavalry warfare, his division #2 was crushed by the White Guard cavalry led by General Ivan Barbovich (Барбович). After this event, the Bolshevik command could not entrust any cavalry to him and he was recalled to Moscow to complete his studies.

== After the civil war ==
In March 1921 Dybenko led, under the command of Mikhail Tukhachevsky, the suppression of the naval rebellion in Kronstadt. Following the military action, Dybenko created a court martial, that "Individually discussed each man's case".

Dybenko won there his first Order of the Combat Red Banner, then the USSR's supreme decoration. He received two more, in peacetime, (12.2.1922, 19.4.22) for his excellency in suppression of peasants uprisings (One- for the Tambov uprising, the second- unclear).

Dybenko wrote several books, all memoirs from the pre-revolutionary and revolutionary eras. The high quality of these books was no match with his very low education and poor vocabulary. This led some historians to suspect he could not have written them, and they were indeed written by his wife Alexandra Kollontai.

In 1922 Dybenko finished (as an extern) the General Staff Military Academy. Alexandra Kollontai admitted in her memoirs she wrote all his home assignments and his thesis. She also authored some army reform ideas, which Dybenko ascribed to himself. Soon their marriage collapsed, Dybenko attempted suicide, and Kollontai arranged a diplomatic mission for herself, just to be as far as possible from him. Dybenko was married twice more.

After finishing the academy, Dybenko was appointed Commander of the 5th Rifle Corps of the Red Army, and then the 10th Rifle Corps and restored as a member of the Communist Party. Dybenko served between 1925 and 1928 as a head of the Artillery Directorate and the Supply Directorate of the General Staff of the Red Army.

In 1928 he was sent to command the Central Asia Military District. To mask his ignorance in military matters, he always preferred "the Iron Fist method". He created a Border Guard and fought against smugglers. He suppressed the local nationalists and Muslim devotees with notable cruelty. He did not hesitate to attack civilians in the peacetime, or to set fire to entire populated villages.

In 1930 Dybenko was sent, with a numerous group of other generals, to Germany.

In 1933 Dybenko was appointed the Volga military district commander. According to Stalin's well known method, his enemy of old, corps commander Ivan Semenovich Kutyakov (ru), a renowned hero of the Civil War, was assigned as Dybenko's deputy. Both wrote many slanderous letters against each other. This slander caused the liquidation of Kutyakov in 1937. Kutyakov was arrested by NKVD men in Dybenko's office, with Dybenko's personal assistance, and soon was shot. Dybenko himself suffered no harm.

Kutyakov's complaints contained mainly the truth about Dybenko's brutality, drunkenness and incompetence. These accusations were well known in the top level of the Soviet army. Tukhachevsky and Uborevich openly criticized him. But he wrote an explanatory letter to Voroshilov, then the Defence Minister, and was pardoned. Later in 1937, Dybenko assisted the NKVD in preparing Tukhachevsky's arrest.

Dybenko became a member of the Supreme Soviet of the USSR, was promoted to Komandarm second class ("Four Rombs", at that time it was equivalent to a 4 star general), and appointed the Leningrad military district commander after Iona Yakir's downfall. The Leningrad military district was always one of the most important districts, second only to Kyiv.

While serving in 1935–1937 as the Volga military district commander, Dybenko requested and obtained from the local Soviet authorities the allocation of an island on the Volga river, 57 square kilometers large, to be used for hunting as a form of military exercise by the soldiers.

Dybenko personally led the purges in the Leningrad military district in 1936–1937. In 1938 he participated, as a judge, in the trial of the Tukhachevsky group.

== Downfall ==
Dybenko apparently welcomed the start of Stalin's assault on the high command of the Red Army during the Great Purge, because it began with the sudden arrests of Marshal Tukhachevsky and other senior officers in May 1937. When the Military Council to discuss the affair on 1 June 1937, with Stalin present, Dybenko boasted about his past conflict with Tukhachevsky and his fellow defendants, saying: "They declared that we were illiterate. I declare to the Politburo that we are more literate than them in military affairs." He was named as one of judges at the trial of Tukhachevsky and others on 11 June.

Dybenko personally led the purges in the Leningrad military district in 1936–37, but was among the officers purged from the Party in 1938. At first, he was moved from his command of the Leningrad Military District officially for "lack of trust" and appointed Deputy People's Commissar of Forestry Industry, as a preparation for his arrest, in order to disconnect him from his followers. Five days later, he was arrested and accused of Hitlerite conspiracy and links with Mikhail Tukhachevsky. He did not deny the accusations of using state funds to organize sex and alcohol orgies. Edward Radzinsky citing an unknown NKVDist, claimed that NKVD tortured Dybenko by putting a box with nails over his head. Roy Medvedev repeated this claim without attribution. Vladimir Shigin questions this statement, claiming that contrary to the legend about a staunch revolutionary, Dybenko during all his five arrests (including the ones by Tsarist Russia) was quick to confess and betray his comrades. Therefore, any tortures were completely unnecessary.

Zinaida Viktorovna Dybenko (Karpova) (Дыбенко (Карпова) Зинаида Викторовна), Dybenko's third wife, was arrested and charged with being a "ЧСИР" (ChSIR) – "a member of traitor's family". She confessed to the authorities about her husband being a traitor and a spy. She was sentenced to five years in ALZhIR ("Akmolinsk camp for the wives of traitors to the Motherland").

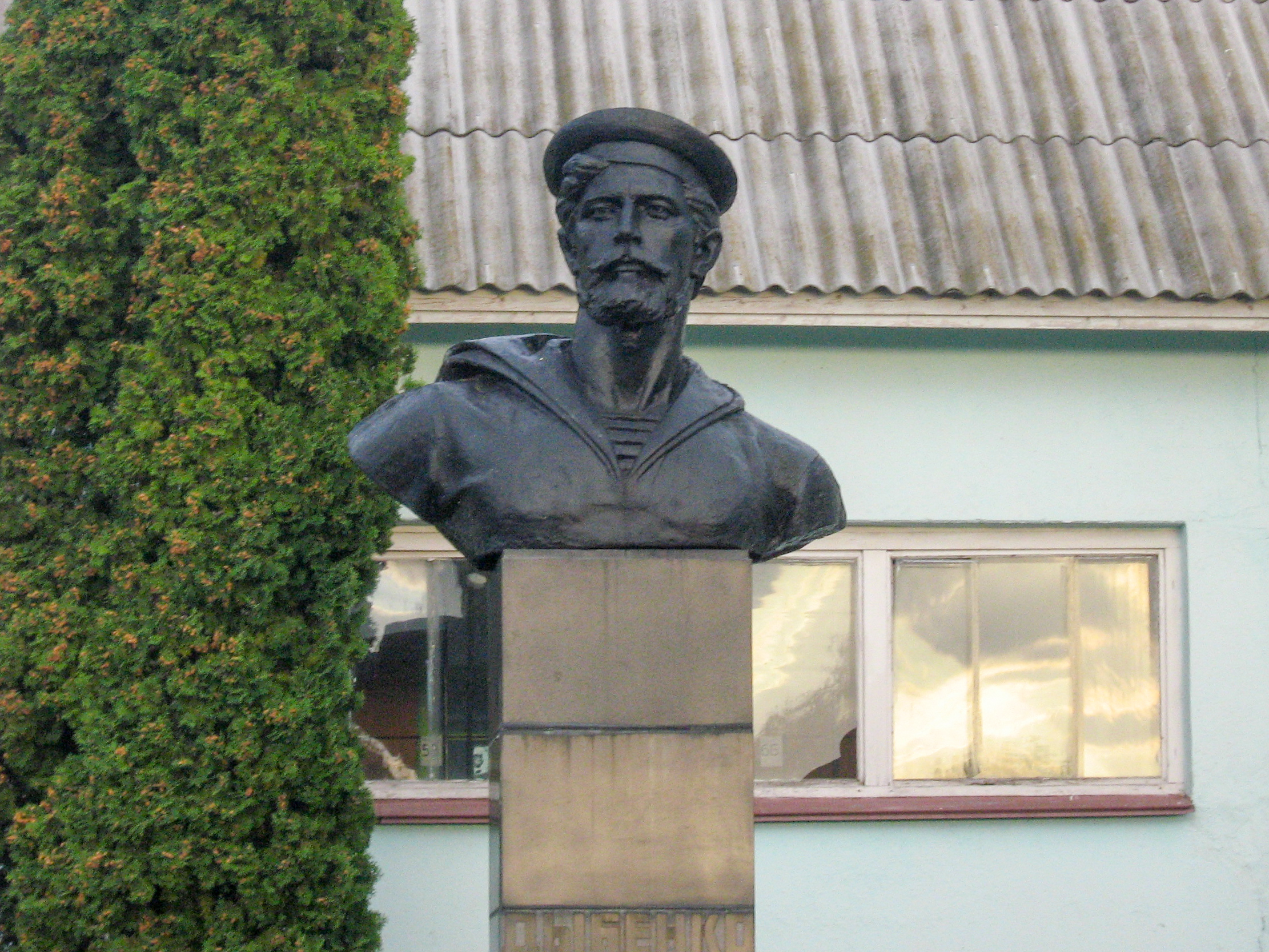
Bust of Dybenko in Bryansk

Dybenko was sentenced to death and shot on 29 July 1938. In 1956, following the death of Stalin, he was rehabilitated (posthumously exonerated).

== Books by Dybenko ==
- The Depths of the Tzarist Navy (В недрах царского флота), 1919;
- The Rebels (Мятежники), 1923;
- October on Baltics (Октябрь на Балтике) 1934;
- The Baltic revolutionaries (Революционные балтийцы)
- From the Depth of the Tzarist Navy to the Great October (Из недр царского флота к Великому Октябрю) free online full text, russian

Preceded by Konstantin Avksentevsky	Commander of the Central Asia Military District; 1928–1933	Succeeded by Mikhail Velikanov

== See also ==
- Outline of the Russian Revolution and Civil War
- Bibliography of the Russian Revolution and Civil War
- Bibliography of Stalinism and the Soviet Union
- Index of Old Bolsheviks
- Index of articles related to the Russian Revolution and Civil War
