= 1st Ukrainian Soviet Army =

The 1st Ukrainian Soviet Army was a field army of the Red Army during the Russian Civil War, which existed between April 15, 1919 and June 25, 1919 when the Ukrainian Front was abolished. The troops were the transferred to form the 12th Army of the Western Front.

== History ==
The First Ukrainian Soviet Army fought against the UNR Army west of Kiev and by the end of May occupied Rivne, Dubno and Sarny, having cleared a considerable part of the Western Ukraine from the enemy and interrupted the connection of the UNR Army with Galicia.
In May, the Army participated in the elimination of the Grigoriev Uprising.
On May 28, 1919, the Army transferred part of its troops to the Southern Front and went on the defensive, continuing to fight against Petlyura and local armed formations in the districts of Rivne, Ostroh, Sarny, and Proskurov.

== Commanders ==
- Sergey Matiletsky: 15.04.1919 — 27.05.1919
- Ivan Naumovich Dubovoy: 27.05.1919 — 25.06.1920

== Sources ==
- Гражданская война и военная интервенция в СССР. Энциклопедия. Moscow: Soviet Encyclopedia, 1983.
- Central State Archive of the Soviet Army. In two volumes. Volume 1. Guide. TsGASA, 1991 С. 281—283
