= 3rd Ukrainian Soviet Army =

Soviet Army military unit

The 3rd Ukrainian Soviet Army (Ukrainian: 3-тя українська радянська армія, romanized: 3-tya ukrayins'ka radyans'ka armiya) was a field army of the Red Army during the Russian Civil War, which existed between April 15, 1919 and June 13, 1919 as part of the Ukrainian Front. Then the troops became part of the newly formed 12th Army of the Western Front.

== History ==
The 3rd Ukrainian Soviet Army fought against the UNR Army in the Odesa–Kherson–Mykolaiv area, and by the end of April had cleared the entire Left Bank from the enemy from Transnistria to Tiraspol. On May 11, 1919, the Army forces crossed the Dniester river and advanced towards Chișinău, but the offensive was halted after the beginning of the anti-Soviet Grigoriev Uprising. Parts of the Army participated in the suppression of this uprising.

On May 28, the Army transferred part of the troops to the Southern Front and went on the defensive against the advancing White troops of Anton Denikin.

== Commanders ==
- Nikolai Khudyakov (April 15 - June 13, 1919).

== Sources ==
- Civil war and military intervention in the USSR. Encyclopedia. Moscow: Soviet Encyclopedia, 1983.
- Central State Archive of the Soviet Army. In two volumes. Volume 1. Guide. TsGASA, 1991, pp. 292-293
- Savchenko VA A. Twelve Wars for Ukraine. - Kharkov: Folio, 2006.
