= Advance on Moscow (1919) =

White Army military campaign during the Russian Civil War

- Part of the Southern Front of the Russian Civil War
- Southern Front of the Russian Civil War (summer 1919)
Date	3 July – 18 November 1919
Location	Don Host Oblast, Donbass, Northeastern Ukraine, Lower Volga region, Central Russia
Result	White strategic failure; Beginning of the catastrophic retreat of the AFSR; Evacuation of AFSR remnants to the Crimea peninsula.

Belligerents
South Russia	Russian SFSR; Makhnovshchina

Commanders and leaders
Anton Denikin; Pyotr Wrangel; Andrei Shkuro; Vladimir Sidorin; K. Mamontov; V. May-Mayevsky; Alexander Kutepov; Abram Dragomirov	Leon Trotsky; Sergey Kamenev; Vladimir Yegoryev; Alexander Yegorov; Vasily Shorin; V. Selivachyov; Semyon Budyonny; Vitaly Primakov

Units involved
Armed Forces of South Russia: Caucasus Army; Don Army; Volunteer Army	Southern Front: 8th Army; 12th Army; 13th Army; 14th Army; Southeastern Front: 9th Army; 10th Army; 1st Cavalry Army

Strength
70,000 (15 October)	115,500 (15 October)

Casualties and losses
Unknown	Unknown

The Advance on Moscow was a military campaign of the White Armed Forces of South Russia (AFSR), launched against the RSFSR in July 1919 during the Russian Civil War. The goal of the campaign was the capture of Moscow, which, according to the chief of the White Army Anton Denikin, would play a decisive role in the outcome of the Civil War and bring the Whites closer to the final victory. After initial successes, in which the city of Oryol at only 360 kilometres (220 mi) from Moscow was taken, Denikin's overextended Army was decisively defeated in a series of battles in October and November 1919.

The Moscow campaign of the AFSR can be divided into two phases: the offensive of the AFSR (3 July–10 October) and the counteroffensive of the Red Southern Front (11 October–November 18).

== Background ==
In mid-1919, the situation on the Southern Front, which in the first months of the year was much better for the Reds, changed in favor of Whites and the Armed Forces of South Russia commanded by Anton Denikin. At the end of April 1919, Nikolai Vsevolodov, who commanded the 9th Red Army, turned over to the White movement, and in the weeks leading up to his escape he was passing on information to the Whites from his post. At the beginning of May, Nykyfor Hryhoriv, who had led the Ukrainian Front of the Red Army in an operation to capture Kherson Governorate from the Allies, revolted against his Bolshevik commanders. Hryhoriv came to control the area from Nikolaev and Kherson in the west to Ekaterinoslav in the east. This area had so far been a source of replenishment and supplies for the Red Army units fighting against the Armed Forces of South Russia. In May and early June, the whites were finally claimed victory in the fierce battle of Donbass. Then on 27 June 1919, the White units of Vladimir May-Mayevsky successfully completed an operation to capture the Ukrainian Soviet capital of Kharkov, and on 29-30 June 1919, forces commanded by Andrei Shkuro captured Ekaterinoslav. In the northern part of the Don region, Cossacks led an uprising against the local Bolshevik authorities, in response to their repressive policy and persecution of the Orthodox Church. In June, the White troops under the command of Vladimir Sidorin managed to join the Cossack insurgents and oust the Bolsheviks from the entire Don region. Finally, in the last days of the same month, the Kuban Cossacks under the command of Pyotr Wrangel, using tanks supplied by the British, captured the strategic southern city of Tsaritsyn. There, on 3 July, at the parade of Wrangel's troops, Denikin announced that the next goal of the White movement would be to capture the capital of Soviet Russia.

== Plan of action ==
Denikin's Moscow directive (order No. 08878) determined the following directions of action:

- Pyotr Wrangel (Caucasian Army) was to move north towards Saratov, then Rtishchevo and Balashov and then Penza, Ruzayevka, Arzamas and Nizhny Novgorod. His troops were to attack Moscow from Vladimir. In front of the main forces of Wrangel, units whose task was to break up the red units on the lower Volga and establish communication with Alexander Kolchak's Russian Army;
- Vladimir Sidorin (Don Army) was to head north to Kamyshin and Balashov, and then, coordinating his actions with Wrangel, lead some of the forces to Voronezh, Kozlov and Ryazan, with the prospect of attacking Moscow, and the other part of them should be directed to Novy Oskol, Yelets and Kashira, then also attack Moscow;
- Vladimir May-Mayevsky (Volunteer Army) was tasked with winning Kursk, Oryol and Tula, and in order to protect against the red forces in Ukraine, reach the line of the Dnieper and Desna, and enter Kiev, to secure all places between Ekaterinoslav and Briansk where it was possible to cross rivers,
- Sergei Dobrovolsky was tasked with gaining control over the mouth of the Dnieper, Kherson and Mykolaiv;
- the Black Sea Fleet was to block the port in Odessa and cooperate in the implementation of other combat tasks.

Denikin intended to use railroads to carry out all tasks ashore. He also ordered to start recruiting volunteers and to carry out large-scale propaganda campaign. Denikin's plan was optimistic, overestimating the capabilities of his forces after being impressed by the recent successes. For this reason Denikin ignored Wrangel's suggestions to postpone a major offensive on Moscow, allow troops to rest, and focus temporarily on defense along the Ekaterinoslav-Tsaritsyn line and only launch an attack against Astrakhan. This solution, however, also carried a certain risk - time worked in favor of the reds, they could mobilize larger reserves.

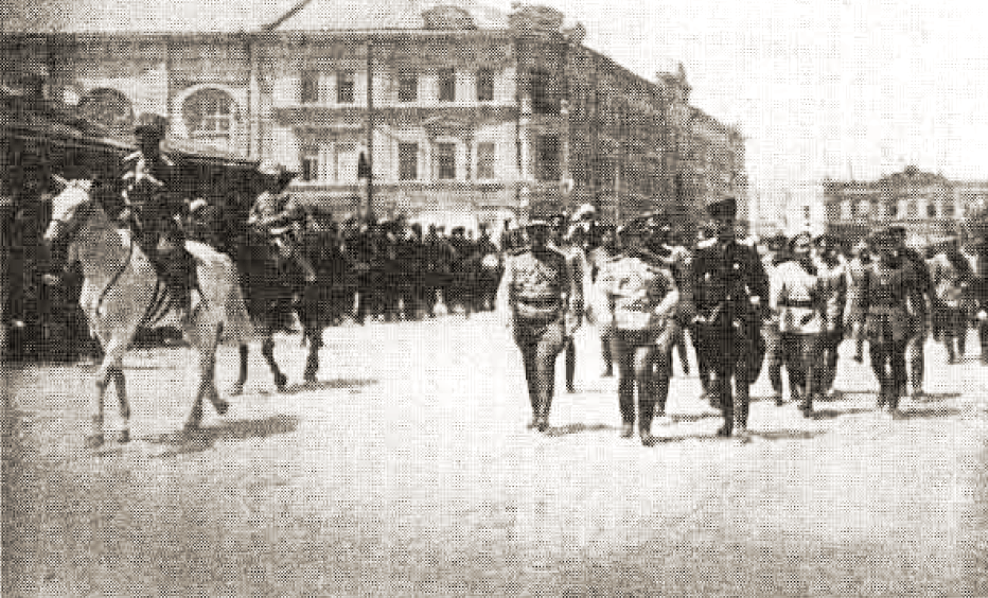
Denikin and Wrangel in Tsaritsyn. Shortly after the city was occupied, the plan of the Armed Forces of South Russia's march towards Moscow was announced.

On 9 July, Lenin issued a circular "Everyone to Fight Denikin!", calling for a reorganization of forces and effective resistance to further white actions on the southern front. A dispute arose in the command of the Red Army over what the response to the capture of Tsaritsyn by the whites and further actions against Denikin's army in Kuban should look like. The commander-in-chief of the Red Army, Jukums Vācietis, supported by the commissioner for military and maritime affairs, Leon Trotsky, suggested that an offensive should be led through Donbass, where, as Trotsky argued, the soldiers could count on the support of the workers. However, Vācietis was removed from his post and replaced by Sergei Kamenev, who developed a plan to attack Tsaritsyn, then Novocherkassk and Rostov. Then the offensive would be entrusted to the 9th and 10th Red Armies, not the much weaker 13th and 14th Red Armies.

== Battle ==
=== Early stage (July–August 1919) ===
Although the actions planned by Denikin in Ukraine were to be only of a protective nature, it was in this area that the whites achieved their first important successes in the course of the launched offensive. On 29 July 1919 they seized Poltava, on 18 August they captured Nikolaev, and on 23 August they landed at Odessa. On the same day, they entered Kiev, forcing the forces of the Ukrainian People's Republic to leave the city, which also reached it in the course of a separate offensive on 23 August. According to Evan Mawdsley, Denikin's Ukrainian offensive was a strategic mistake, as the forces that led it, consequently, could not engage in combat on the key central section of the front, and its line was stretched too thin.

=== Corrected directive (August–September 1919) ===
At the same time, the Red Army started to implement Kamenev's planned counteroffensive. On 14 August, a strike group under the command of Vasily Shorin (8th and 9th Army) began the march on Tsaritsyn, while the group under the command of Vladimir Selivachyov (parts of the 8th and 14th Armies and the 13th Army) was directed to Kharkov. Shorin's group attacked Wrangel's Caucasian Army, which left Tsaritsyn north and was approaching Saratov, but its march was halted due to lack of food and supplies. Wrangel had to withdraw from Kamyshin and take up a defensive position in Tsaritsyn, where he successfully defended himself; after six weeks of fighting, Shorin's group lost the ability to engage in any offensive actions, especially after it was attacked by cavalry under the command of Konstantin Mamontov.

The Mamontov raid, exploiting the gap between the 8th and 9th Armies, was not included in the original plan of the march to Moscow and may have been undertaken without the consent of Denikin. Numbering 7-8 thousand cavalry, the group destroyed the communication infrastructure of the Reds, blew up railway tracks and bridges, destroyed a number of ammunition warehouses and dispersed some of the newly created Red Army units. On 18 August 1919, Mamontov's forces captured Tambov, and for two days (11 and 12 September) they captured Voronezh. In these cities, they committed looting on a large scale.

Kamenev's plan, assuming a smooth transition to strike the areas in South Russia that constituted the center of the White movement, failed, because Selivachyov's group had not managed to reach further than Kupiansk, leaving the Ukrainian Soviet capital of Kharkov in the hands of the Whites. According to Mawdsley, it was Selivachyov's defeat that resulted in the failure of Kamenev's entire strategy.

=== General offensive (September–October 1919) ===
In September, the Whites achieved further successes: on 20 September 1919, units under the command of Alexander Kutepov captured Kursk, destroying two red rifle divisions, and on 30 September, the cavalry under Shkuro's command surprised the enemy by crossing the Don and capturing Voronezh. On 14 October, the Armed Forces of South Russia entered Oryol. Never before has such a large area been under their control nor had they ever managed to get closer to Moscow. But the seizure of subsequent provinces, contrary to the expectations of the Whites, weakened them. The administration created by Denikin did not function efficiently, recruits drafted into the army did not want to fight, and the front line was dangerously lengthening. Meanwhile, the Bolshevik government more successfully mobilized new volunteers to fight Denikin. Between September and 15 November 1919, 100,000 new red soldiers were sent to the Southern Front.

Another significant reorganization was carried out in the Red Army. On 27 September, impressed by the successes of the Whites, the Southeastern Front was formed from the 9th and 10th Armies, operating on the section from Tsaritsyn to Bobrov under the command of Shorin. Stretched between Bobrov and Zhytomyr was the Southern Front, consisting of the 8th, 12th, 13th and 14th Armies, under the command of Alexander Yegorov. Sergey Kamenev was to be personally responsible for coordinating their activities. Moreover, the first large cavalry unit on this side of the conflict was created - the 1st Cavalry Army - and ineffective commanders were replaced. On the White side, the division into four groups planned by Denikin continued. Wrangel's forces defended Tsaritsyn, a Sidorin's Don Cossacks operated to the west, Kiev was defended by Abram Dragomirov's troops, while the central part of the front was held by Vladimir May-Mayevsky. Denikin had practically no reserves, because those troops that were not involved in the march to Moscow were facing engagements with Nestor Makhno's Revolutionary Insurgent Army, which had captured most of eastern Ukraine and were approaching the White headquarters of Taganrog, while a separate group of 3-5 thousand soldiers led the battle for the Red-held Astrakhan. Denikin made the mistake of not shortening the front, temporarily stepping back from the farthest positions in the face of the Insurgent Army's threat against him. His staff was overly optimistic and believed that the Whites, who had already overcome many great difficulties, would also be victorious this time, despite the lack of support from the population in the occupied areas, diseases plaguing White soldiers and bad organization.

=== Collapse of the general offensive (October–December 1919) ===
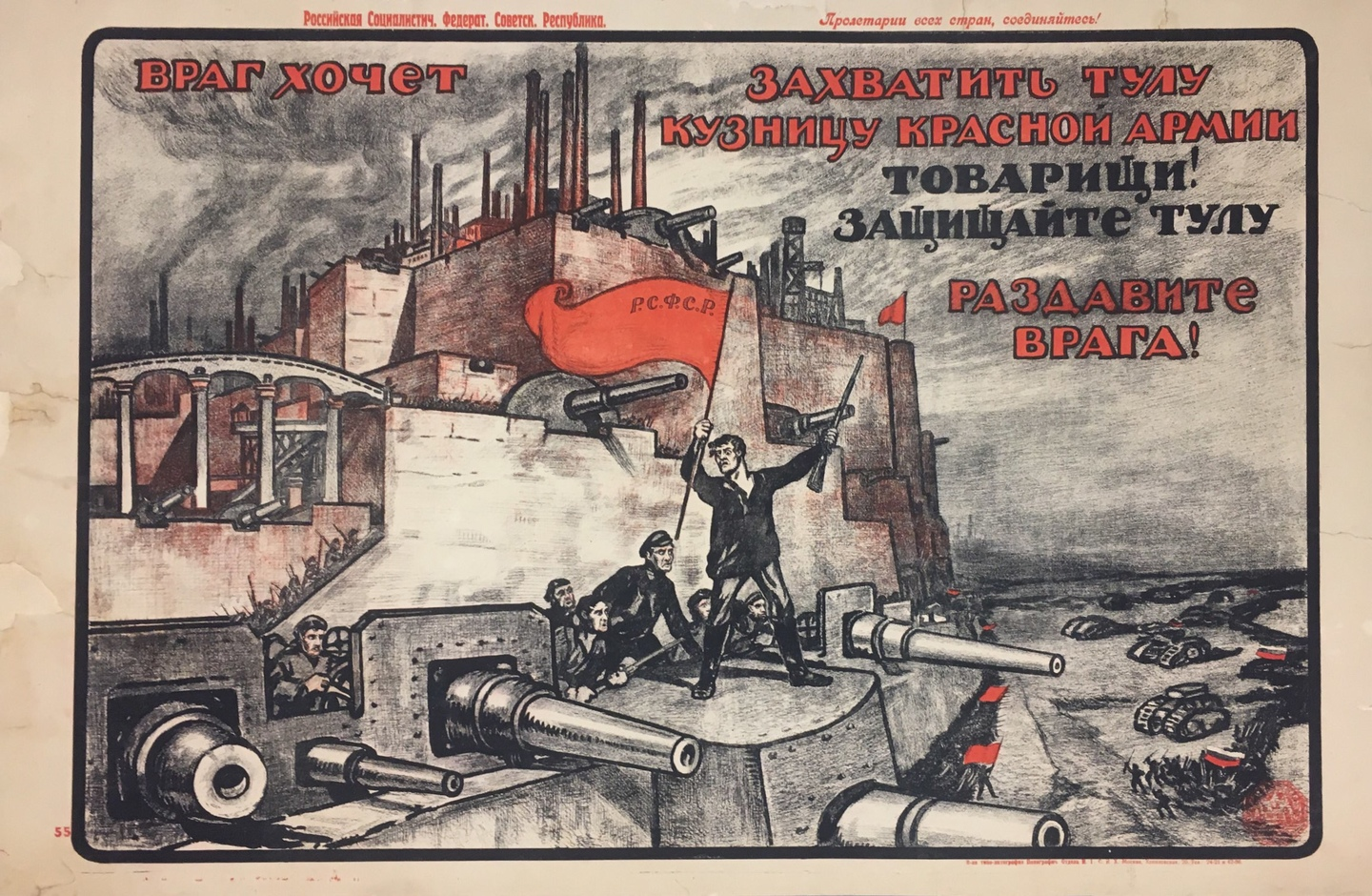
Bolshevik propaganda poster calling for the defense of Tula against the Armed Forces of South Russia.

At the end of October 1919, the Red Army's counteroffensive began simultaneously in two sections. On 20 October, a strike group composed of the Latvian infantry division, the Ukrainian Cavalry Brigade under the command of Vitaliy Primakov, the 13th Rifle Division and the Estonian Rifle Division forced May-Mayevsky to leave Oryol and to retreat further south. Threatened with encirclement, the Whites departed in an orderly manner to Kursk. At the same time, the commander of the 1st Cavalry Army, Semyon Budyonny, against the orders of the front commander, attacked Voronezh, because he wanted to face the famous White cavalry in a direct battle. He achieved a spectacular victory over the forces of Mamontov and Shkuro, entering the city on 24 October. The next operation to capture the key railway junction at Kastornoye continued for a month. Its conquest by the Reds meant the separation of the Don Cossack forces and the Volunteer Army. On 15 November, the Reds seized Kursk. These were groundbreaking battles for the entire civil war. The defeat of the Moscow offensive was the prelude to the final defeat of Whites in the conflict.

== Major Battles ==
- Mamontov raid (10 August — 19 September 1919)
- Southern Front counteroffensive (14 August — 12 September 1919)
- Oryol–Kursk operation (11 October — 18 November 1919)
- Voronezh-Kastornoye operation (13 October — 16 November 1919)
- Chernihiv operation (17 October — 18 November 1919)
- Liski-Bobrovskaya operation (November 1919)

== See also ==
- Bibliography of the Russian Revolution and Civil War
- Outline of the Russian Revolution and Civil War
- Index of articles related to the Russian Revolution and Civil War
- The "Russian" Civil Wars, 1916–1926: Ten Years That Shook the World
- Russia in Flames: War, Revolution, Civil War, 1914–1921
- Russia in Revolution: An Empire in Crisis, 1890 to 1928
- Russia: Revolution and Civil War, 1917—1921
- The Russian Revolution: A New History

== Bibliography ==
- Kenez, Peter (2004). Red Advance, White Defeat. Civil War in South Russia 1919-1920. Washington DC: New Academia Publishing. ISBN 0974493457.
- Mawdsley, Evan (2010). Wojna domowa w Rosji 1917–1920 (in Polish). Translated by Monika Popławska. Warsaw: Bellona. ISBN 978-83-11-11638-2. OCLC 750846354.
- Serczyk, W. (2001). Historia Ukrainy (in Polish). Wrocław: Zakład Narodowy im. Ossolińskich. ISBN 83-04-04530-3.
- Smele, J. D. (2015). The "Russian" Civil Wars 1916-1926. Ten Years That Shook the World. London: C. Hurst & Co. ISBN 9781849047210.
