= Alexander Yegorov (general) =

Soviet military leader (1883–1939)

- Алекса́ндр Ильи́ч Его́ров
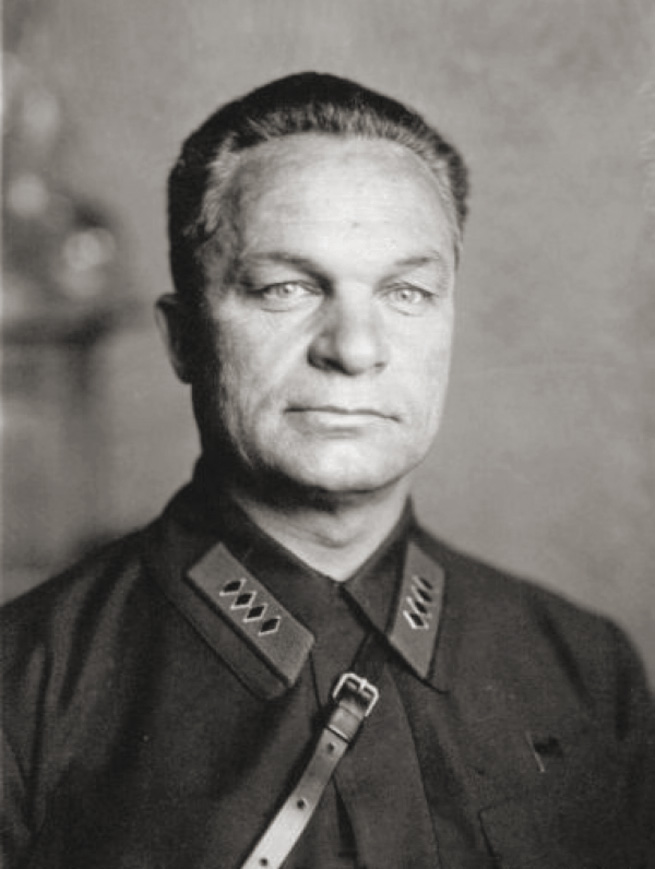
- Yegorov in 1930
- Born: Alexander Ilyich Yegorov; 13 October 1883; Buzuluk, Samara Governorate, Russian Empire
- Died: 23 February 1939 (aged 55); Moscow, Russian SFSR, Soviet Union
- Burial place: Donskoi Cemetery
- Military career
- Allegiance: Russian Empire (1902–1917); Russian SFSR (1917–1922); USSR (1922–1938)
- Branch: Russian Imperial Army; Red Army
- Service years: 1902–1938
- Rank: Lieutenant Colonel (Imperial Army); Marshal of the Soviet Union (Red Army)
- Commands: Chief of the General Staff; Transcaucasian Military District; Kiev Military District; Petrograd Military District; Belorussian Military District; Southwestern Front; Southern Front; 10th Army; 9th Army; 14th Army
- Conflicts: World War I; Russian Civil War; Battle of Tsaritsyn; Battle of Pletnev (WIA); Manych Operation (1919); Advance on Moscow (1919); August Counteroffensive; October Counteroffensive; Voronezh–Kastornoye Operation; Orel–Kursk Operation; Final Operations againts Denikinshchina; Kharkiv Operation; Offensive in Ukraine (1920); Odessa Operation II; Polish–Soviet War; Defensive operations on the Southwestern Front; Kiev Offensive (1920); Offensive operations on the Southwestern Front; Rovno Operation; Battle of Lwow (1920)
- Awards: (see below)

Alexander Ilyich Yegorov or Egorov (Russian: Александр Ильич Егоров, romanized: Aleksandr Il'ich Yegórov) (25 October [O.S. 13 October] 1883 – 23 February 1939) was a Soviet military leader and one of the original five Marshals of the Soviet Union.

Yegorov was born in Samara to a middle-class family. He joined the Imperial Russian Army in 1901 and saw action during the First World War. Following the outbreak of the Russian Revolution, Yegorov became a member of the Communist Party of the Soviet Union and was one of the few trusted ex-tsarist officers in the Red Army. During the Russian Civil War, he commanded the Red Army's Southern Front and played an important part in defeating the White forces in Ukraine. Yegorov was the commander of the Southwestern Front during the Polish–Soviet War.

A good friend of Joseph Stalin, Yegorov further advanced his career in the 1920s. He served briefly as a military adviser to Chiang Kai-shek and Feng Yuxiang in China, and following his return to the Soviet Union he commanded the Belorussian Military District. In 1934, Yegorov was elected to the Central Committee of the Communist Party, and a year later he was named a Marshal of the Soviet Union and Chief of the General Staff.

When the Great Purge began, Yegorov was initially spared, and he was one of the judges that presided over the trial of Mikhail Tukhachevsky. By the end of 1937 he had become a target, and he was arrested a few months later. Yegorov was executed in February 1939.

== Early life ==
Yegorov was born near Samara in central Russia, to a middle-class family. In 1901, after completing six classes of classical gymnasium in Samara, he joined the Imperial Russian Army, as a volunteer.

== Military career ==
After graduating from Junkers school in Kazan in 1905, he was assigned to Transcaucasia, where he and his unit participated in suppressing protests in Tiflis, Baku and Gori, during the Russian Revolution of 1905. For his participation in the pacification of protests, he was awarded the Order of Saint Stanislaus, 3rd class. In 1904, he had joined the Socialist Revolutionary Party, but withdrew his membership in 1909.

=== World War I ===
During World War I he rose to the rank of Lieutenant Colonel and fought as the commander of the company and battalion within the 132nd Bender Infantry Regiment. He was injured three times, and was awarded the Golden Sword for Bravery and six other decorations for his heroism. In the four months of 1915, he served as a battalion commander of one of the reserve regiments in Tver, followed by another two months training future ensigns in Riga.

=== Russian Civil War and Polish-Soviet War ===
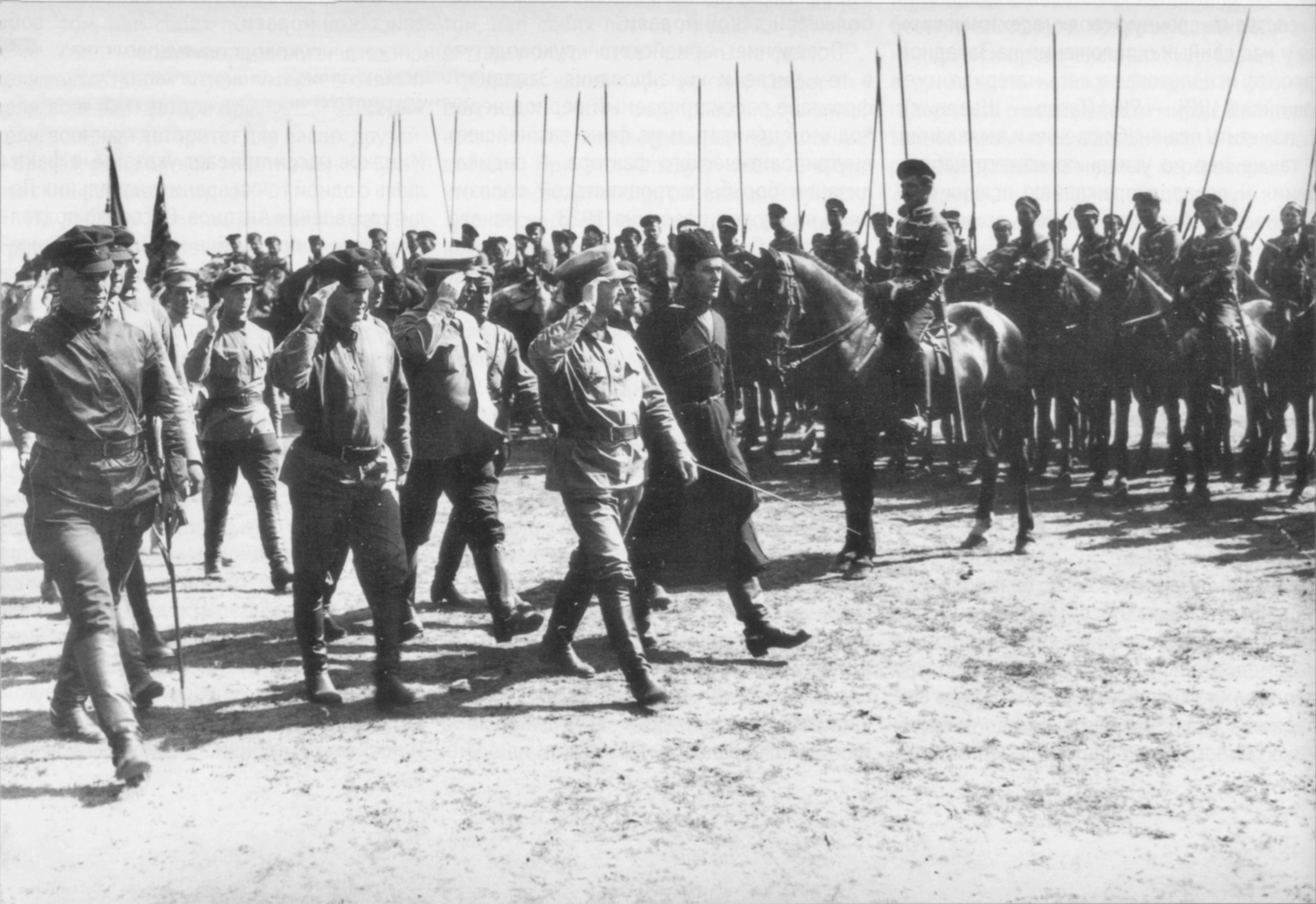
Yegorov (far left) with Trotsky in Kharkov, 1919.

During the February Revolution, hoping to further develop his military career, he re-joined the Socialist Revolutionaries and became a member of the military council of the 32nd division on behalf of the Socialist Revolutionaries. He broke up with them in the summer of 1918, after their unsuccessful rebellion against the Bolshevik authorities. In 1918, he joined the newly created Workers and Peasants Red Army and in July 1918, he also became a member of the Communist Party of the Soviet Union. In 1918, he chaired the officer verification commission for the newly created Red Army and was the commissioner of its general staff.

As one of the few ex-tsarist officers at this stage who was trusted by the Bolshevik leadership, he was assigned to the Southern Front. From August to October 1918, he commanded the section within Balashov and Kamyshin, and the 9th Army, where he formed regular units from irregular Red Army formations. On 26 December 1918 he replaced Kliment Voroshilov as commander of the 10th Army, during the Battle of Tsaritsyn. In March 1919, with over 23,000 troops under his command, he carried out an offensive along the railway line from Tsaritsyn to Velikoknyazheskaya. The 10th Army was halted by the White Army soldiers led by General Konstantin Mamontov, in the swampy areas near River Manych, but the numerical superiority of the Red Army gave them a chance to continue their march towards Bataysk and Tikhoretsk.

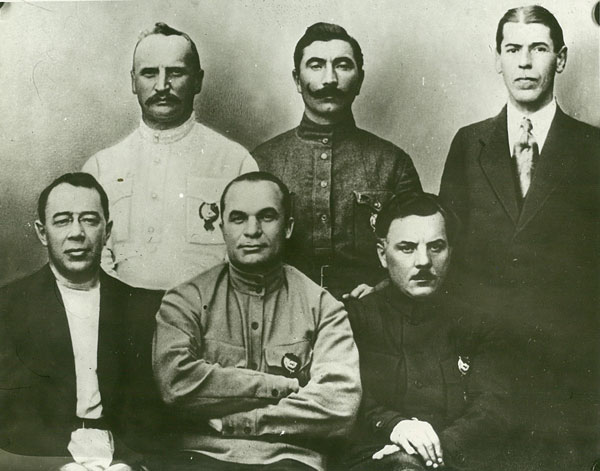
Yegorov (sitting, second from left) with other Red Army commanders, 1921.

From July 1919, he commanded the 14th Army fighting in eastern Ukraine. In the autumn of 1919, replacing Vladimir Gittis, he took command of the entire Southern Front in the face of the threat posed by the offensive of the Armed Forces of South Russia under the command of General Anton Denikin. The forces under his command successfully defeated Denikin's forces and in October 1919, the forces under Yegorov's command captured Oryol and together with the troops of the Southeastern Front led by Vasily Shorin, they captured Voronezh, crossed the Don River and then drove off the White Army units from Rostov-on-Don and Novocherkassk. After these events, the White Army finally lost the initiative in the Civil War. For his battle successes, Yegorov was awarded the Order of the Red Banner.

During the Polish-Soviet War, Yegorov served as commander of the Southwestern Front, which consisted of the 8th, 12th, 13th and 14th Armies. The Front Commissar was Joseph Stalin, whose deputy was Yan Berzin. Initially, the forces under his command achieved a number of successes, including the capture of Kiev, Podolia and Galicia from Poles, and approached closer to Lwów. However, Yegorov, disregarding the orders of the high command, did not send the First Cavalry Army commanded by Semyon Budyonny to reinforce the Western Front, which led to a successful defense of Lwów by Polish Army troops led by General Edward Rydz-Śmigły and the subsequent Soviet defeat in the Battle of Warsaw in 1920.

=== Post war ===
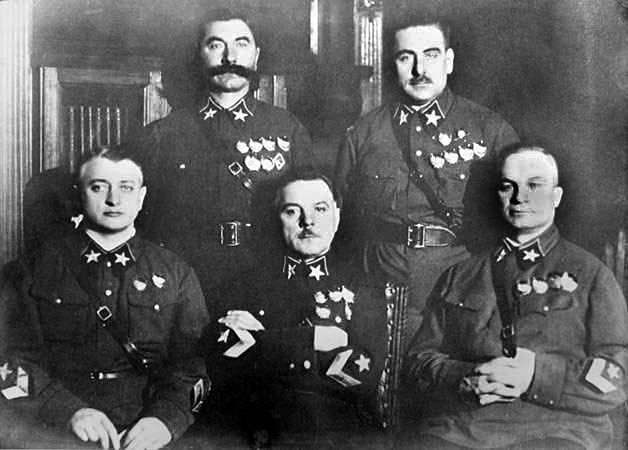
The first five Marshals of the Soviet Union in November 1935, clockwise from top left: Semyon Budyonny, Vasily Blyukher, Alexander Yegorov, Kliment Voroshilov and Mikhail Tukhachevsky. Only Budyonny and Voroshilov would survive Stalin's Great Purge.

His further career in the 1920s was facilitated by good relations with Stalin, whom he met during the defense of Tsaritsyn. Both men were considered friends and their families spent holidays together. However, Stalin never trusted Yegorov and believed that the latter had never become a good communist. Stalin had collected a private archive of discreditable materials against Yegorov.

After the Polish-Soviet War, Yegorov served as commander of the Kiev and Petrograd Military Districts from December 1920 to September 1921. From September 1921 to May 1924, he served as commander of the Western Front and the Red Banner Caucasus Army. From April 1924 to March 1925, he again served as the commander of the Kiev Military District.

In 1925, he was sent to China, where he served as a military adviser to Chiang Kai-shek and Feng Yuxiang. This was considered an important task for the Soviet leadership, as Soviet Union sought to protect its own interests in China and also to support the Communist movement in China. He served there till 1926.

In 1927, he became commander of the Belorussian Military District. In 1931, Yegorov was appointed Deputy People's Commissar for Defence and Chief of the General Staff of the Red Army. In 1934, he became a candidate member of the Central Committee of the Communist Party of the Soviet Union. In 1935, he became one of the first five Marshals of the Soviet Union when this rank was created.

=== Purge and execution ===
Because of his old connections to Stalin and Budyonny, Yegorov seemed to be safe from the wave of arrests that swept through the Red Army in 1937 as the Great Purge gathered pace.

He was officially listed as one of the judges at Tukhachevsky's trial in June 1937. But at the end of 1937 he was demoted to commander of the Transcaucasian Military District, and was arrested in February 1938 and his military writings were banned. His downfall seems to have begun with a letter in the spring of 1937 from Kombrig Fedor Sudakov of the Frunze Military Academy to Stalin questioning Yegorov's performance; a similar letter was sent by Kombrig Yan Zhigur to Voroshilov on 20 July, and Yegorov was further damaged by confessions extracted from officers arrested during the purge of the army. Yegorov was shot on 23 February 1939. He was cremated and his ashes were buried in a mass grave at Donskoi Cemetery in Moscow.

After Stalin's death in 1953, Nikita Khrushchev rehabilitated Yegorov by the decision of the Military Collegium of the Supreme Court of the Soviet Union. He was also posthumously reinstated his rank of Marshal of the Soviet Union and military awards restored.

== Personal life ==
In 1911, he married Varvara Alexandrovna Egorova (Vasilyeva), with whom he had daughter named Tatyana. After divorcing his first wife, he remarried Galina Antonovna Tseshkovskaya, who was of Polish descent. During the Great Purge, Galina was also arrested and after being accused as a Polish spy, she was executed before her husband on 28 August 1938.

Yegorov's grandson is guitarist Aleksey Kuznetsov, a recipient of the title People's Artist of Russia.

== Awards and honors ==
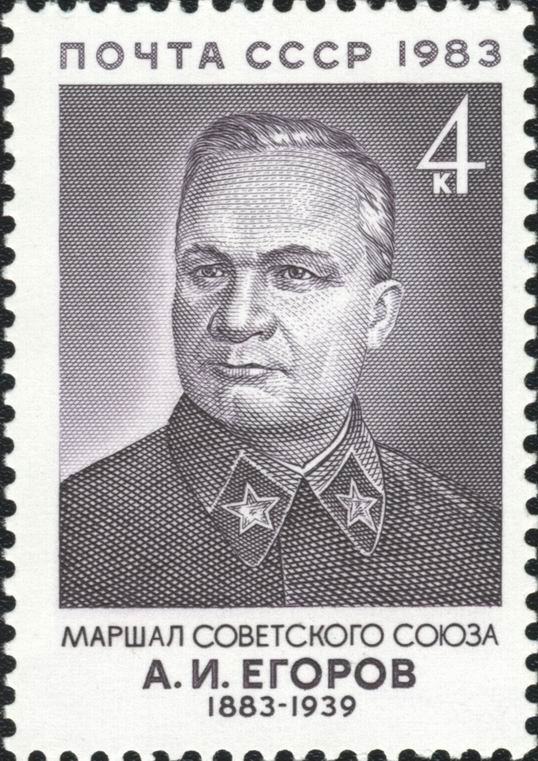
A 1983 Soviet stamp featuring Yegorov

Russian Empire

Order of Saint Vladimir, 2nd class with swords (12 February 1917)
Order of Saint Stanislaus, 2nd class with swords (30 May 1915)
Order of Saint Stanislaus, 3rd class (10 March 1907)
Order of Saint Anna, 2nd class with swords (23 October 1915)
Order of Saint Anna, 3rd class (6 April 1914)
Order of Saint Anna, 4th class (30 March 1915)
Saint George Gold Sword for Bravery, with inscription "For the battle near Busk on 13 August 1914" (24 January 1917)
Medal "In Commemoration of the 300th Anniversary of the Reign of the House of Romanov"
Medal "In Memory of the Patriotic War of 1812"
Cross "50th Anniversary of the End of the Caucasian Wars"

Soviet Union

	Order of the Red Banner, twice (1919, 1930)
?	Order of the Red Banner of Azerbaijan SSR (1922)
?	Order of the Red Banner of Georgian SSR (1924)
?	Honorary Revolutionary Weapon (1921)
	Jubilee Medal "XX Years of the Workers' and Peasants' Red Army" (1938)

=== Other honors ===
- In Buzuluk, a street is named after Yegorov and a bust honoring him is also placed in the town.

Military offices
Preceded by Vladimir Triandafillov	Chief of the Staff of the Red Army; July 1931 – 10 May 1937	Succeeded by Boris Shaposhnikov
