= 21st Rifle Division (Soviet Union) =

20th Mechanized Division (1945–1947) 21st Rifle Division (1919–1945) 5th Ural Infantry Division (1918–1919)
- Active: 1918–1947
- Country: Russian Soviet Federative Socialist Republic (1918–1922); Soviet Union (1922–1947)
- Branch: Red Army / Soviet Army
- Type: Infantry (Mechanized from 1945)
- Size: Division
- Engagements: Russian Civil War; Polish–Soviet War; Battle of Radzymin; Sino-Soviet conflict; World War II; Continuation War; Budapest Offensive; Operation Spring Awakening; Vienna Offensive
- Decorations: Honorary Revolutionary Red Banner
- Battle honours: Perm

Commanders
- Notable commanders: Ivan Smolin

The 21st Rifle Division (Russian: 21-я стрелковая дивизия; Military Unit Number 17752) was an infantry division of the Russian Soviet Federative Socialist Republic and then the Soviet Union's Red Army, active between 1918 and 1945.

Formed in late 1918 during the Russian Civil War as the 5th Ural Infantry Division, the division fought on the Eastern Front. In September 1919 it was split up and two of its brigades and its headquarters transferred west. The division was reunited on the Southern Front in January, fighting in the final stages of the campaign there. In May it was transferred to fight in the Polish–Soviet War, and was one of the divisions that fought in the Battle of Radzymin during the larger Battle of Warsaw. After the Red Army was defeated by a Polish counterattack, the division retreated into Belarus. It transferred east again to suppress a peasant revolt in Western Siberia, and remained there until 1929, when it transferred to the Soviet Far East to fight in the Sino-Soviet conflict of that year. After Operation Barbarossa began on June 22, 1941, the division was sent west in September and fought in the Continuation War against Finland in Karelia. From the spring of 1944 it fought in the Arctic sector, initially in the area of Alakurtti. After the withdrawal of Finland from the war, the division was transferred to Hungary in January 1945. It fought in the end of the Budapest Offensive, Operation Spring Awakening, and the Vienna Offensive at the end of the war. Postwar, the 21st was withdrawn to Romania and converted into the 20th Mechanized Division, which was disbanded in 1947.

== Russian Civil War and Polish-Soviet War ==
The 5th Ural Infantry Division was organised during the Russian Civil War on September 3, 1918, out of several smaller partisan detachments in Birsky Uyezd of Perm Governorate. Soon it was reinforced with a single artillery battery from Sankt Petersburg and two Workers' Brigades from the Arkhangelsk Front. The division fought in the Eastern Front of the Russian Civil War against the White Army led by Alexander Kolchak. It was part of the 3rd Army and fought in battles around Osa during the defence of Perm from November 29 to January 6, 1919. Transferred to the 2nd Army in January, it defended the Kama area in battles on the Kungur direction in the Osa area from January to March. During the Spring Offensive of the Russian Army between March and May, the division retreated to the line of the Kama River and the Vyatka River. On March 19 it was renamed the 21st Rifle Division. When the Red counteroffensive began in May, the division fought in the Sarapul–Votkinsk Operation between May 25 and June 12, advancing towards Izhevsk and Votkinsk and reaching the mouth of the Vala River. It then fought in the Perm Offensive between June 21 and July 1, crossing the Kama, Osa, and Iren Rivers and capturing the cities of Osa, Okhansk, and Kungur.

In July, the division was transferred back to the 3rd Army. It fought in the Yekaterinburg Operation between July 5 and July 20, capturing the Sylva factory and the Utkinsk railway junction. In the Chelyabinsk Operation from July 17 to August 4, the division flanked the White Army in the direction of Nizhne-Petropavlovskoye and Peschanskoye. In September the division was split up, with its 1st Brigade sent to the 9th Army on the Southern Front, its 2nd Brigade remaining on the Eastern Front with the 5th Army, and its 3rd Brigade sent to the 15th Army on the Western Front. Between August 20 and November 4, the 2nd Brigade, under the operational control of the 26th Rifle Division, fought in the Petropavlovsk Operation, capturing Petropavlovsk. It continued the advance, fighting in the Omsk Operation, the attack on Omsk, between November 4 and 16. It was transferred west to the 9th Army in November.

The 1st and 3rd Brigades completed their journeys across Russia by October, when they re-entered combat. Between November 20 and December 9, the 1st Brigade fought in the Khopyor–Don Operation against the Armed Forces of South Russia, advancing from the Berezovka area to the Don at its tributaries of Boguchar and Rossosh. Meanwhile, the 3rd Brigade defended Petrograd from October to December against the Northwestern Army. As part of the 9th Army, the division headquarters fought against the Armed Forces of South Russia in the areas of Borisoglebsk, Novokhopyorsk, Kalach, and Boguchar in October and November. Between January 3 and 10, 1920, the 21st advanced to Novocherkassk in the Rostov–Novocherkassk Operation. From January 17 to February 6, it fought in the Don–Manych Operation, crossing the Manych River and capturing the surrounding area. The division continued the advance into the North Caucasus, fighting in the Tikhoretsk Operation between February 14 and March 2. From 3 to 27 March, the division fought in the Kuban–Novorossiysk Offensive, advancing from the Kagalnitskaya area to Yekaterinodar.

Battle of Warsaw positions on August 14

In May, the division was transferred to the Western Front to fight in the Polish–Soviet War, joining the 16th Army. It fought in the Western Front counterattack against the Polish Kiev offensive, the May Offensive, between May 14 and June 8. The 21st participated in a diversionary attack towards Minsk and in fighting near Borisov. Later in June, it was transferred to the 3rd Army. Ivan Smolin took command of the division on 2 July. Between July 4 and 23, the division fought in the July Offensive, during which it attacked Dokshitsy, pursued retreating Polish troops along the Wilno–Warsaw railway line, and captured Volkovysk and Lida. During the Battle of Warsaw from July 23 to August 25, the 21st captured Grodno and Białystok, but was ultimately defeated in the Battle of Radzymin and annihilated in the following days. Its remnants retreated through Grodno to Lida.

The 21st was briefly transferred to the 15th Army in November but became part of the 3rd Army again in December. On December 13, the division received the honorific "Perm" after its place of formation. In February 1921 the division was briefly transferred to the Belomorsky Military District in the Arkhangelsk and Vologda area. However, in March, it was sent to Siberia to suppress the Ishim revolt, part of the Western Siberia Uprising, a series of peasant uprisings against Soviet rule. Directly subordinated to the assistant to the commander in chief for Siberia, the division fought in the suppression of the rebellion in the areas of Novonikolayevsk (later renamed Novosibirsk), Barnaul, Biysk, and Semipalatinsk.

== Interwar period ==
Following the end of the revolt in West Siberia, in 1922, the division was directly subordinated to the commander of troops in Siberia. It became part of the Western Siberian Military District and then the Siberian Military District in 1923. Between October 1, 1925, and December 24, 1931, the division was a territorial formation, manned at a reduced strength. It became part of the 21st Territorial Rifle Corps at Novosibirsk and was initially in reserve during the 1929 Sino-Soviet conflict, fought with Chinese warlord Zhang Xueliang's Northeastern Army over control of the Chinese Eastern Railway in Manchuria.

It was mobilized with the corps on July 13, and became the reserve division for the Transbaikal Group of the Special Far Eastern Army (later the Special Red Banner Far Eastern Army) at Chita. The 21st was commanded by Pavel Ashakhmanov and included the 61st, 62nd and 63rd (named for M.V. Frunze) Rifle Regiments and the 21st Artillery Regiment. On the night of October 2, a battalion from the 61st Regiment launched a raid on Chinese trenches held by the 15th Heilungkiang Brigade's 38th Infantry Regiment near the Abugatai Siding, halfway between Manzhouli and Dalainor. The battalion captured the first Chinese trench line by 01:00 hours on October 3. After Chinese counterattacks, the Soviet troops withdrew from Chinese lines by 03:00 hours. According to an American intelligence report, the battalion inflicted 314 casualties on the Chinese but suffered 183 casualties.

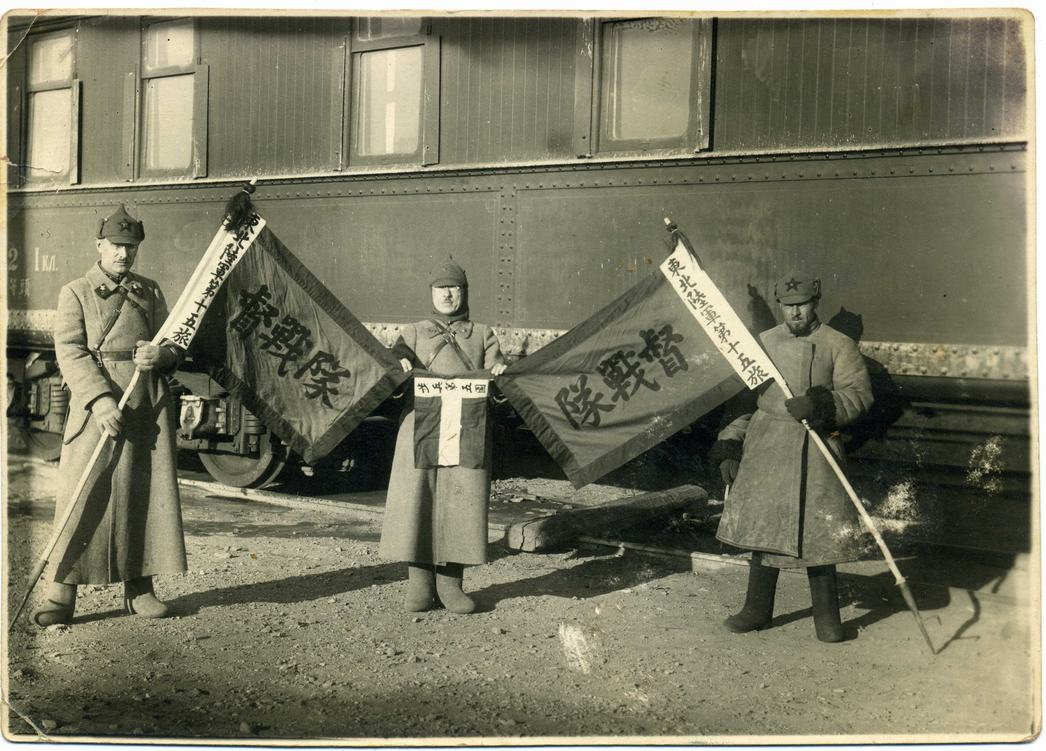
Soviet soldiers with captured Chinese banners, late 1929

During the Dalainor–Manzhouli–Hailar Operation, the largest operation of the war, which began on November 16, the division, with support from armoured trains, tied down the 15th Brigade at Manzhouli. At noon on 17 November, the 21st's 63rd Regiment linked up with the 36th Rifle Division's 106th Rifle Regiment, preventing the 15th Brigade from moving on Dalainor to aid the defending 17th Brigade and cutting off its retreat. After the capture of Manzhouli on November 20, the division remained behind as a garrison force, allowing the 18th Rifle Corps to advance to Hailar. The 21st restored order and basic public services in Manzhouli by November 25, while also distributing propaganda to the civilians.

In 1930, the division was awarded the Honorary Revolutionary Red Banner for its actions in the Russian Civil War and the Sino-Soviet conflict. By 1937 it was stationed at Spassk-Dalny near the Manchurian border. On June 5 of that year, Japanese troops occupied a hill near Lake Khanka in the 21st's sector. The division commander, Kombrig Ivan Boryayev, was ordered to use the division's troops to assist the border guards in repulsing an attack by Japanese troops. Colonel Iosif Dobysh's 63rd Rifle Regiment was moved forward, but by the time it arrived near the border, the Japanese had already withdrawn. Dobysh was subsequently shot, charged with negligence and failure to speedily deploy troops. Boryayev himself was later dismissed on July 13 and arrested weeks later before being shot during the Great Purge. In September 1938, the 21st Division became part of the 1st Red Banner Army.

== World War II ==
On June 22, 1941, the division was part of the 1st Red Banner Army's 26th Rifle Corps. It included the 94th, 116th, and 326th Rifle Regiments, as well as the 78th Light Artillery Regiment and the 109th Howitzer Regiment. Following the German invasion of the Soviet Union and a string of Soviet defeats early in the war, the division was alerted for movement to the front in late August. The division arrived at Ivanovo on September 11, where it received its heavy equipment. The 21st soon assumed defensive positions with the 7th Army along the Svir River between Lake Ladoga and Lake Onega, defending against the Finnish in Karelia in the Continuation War.

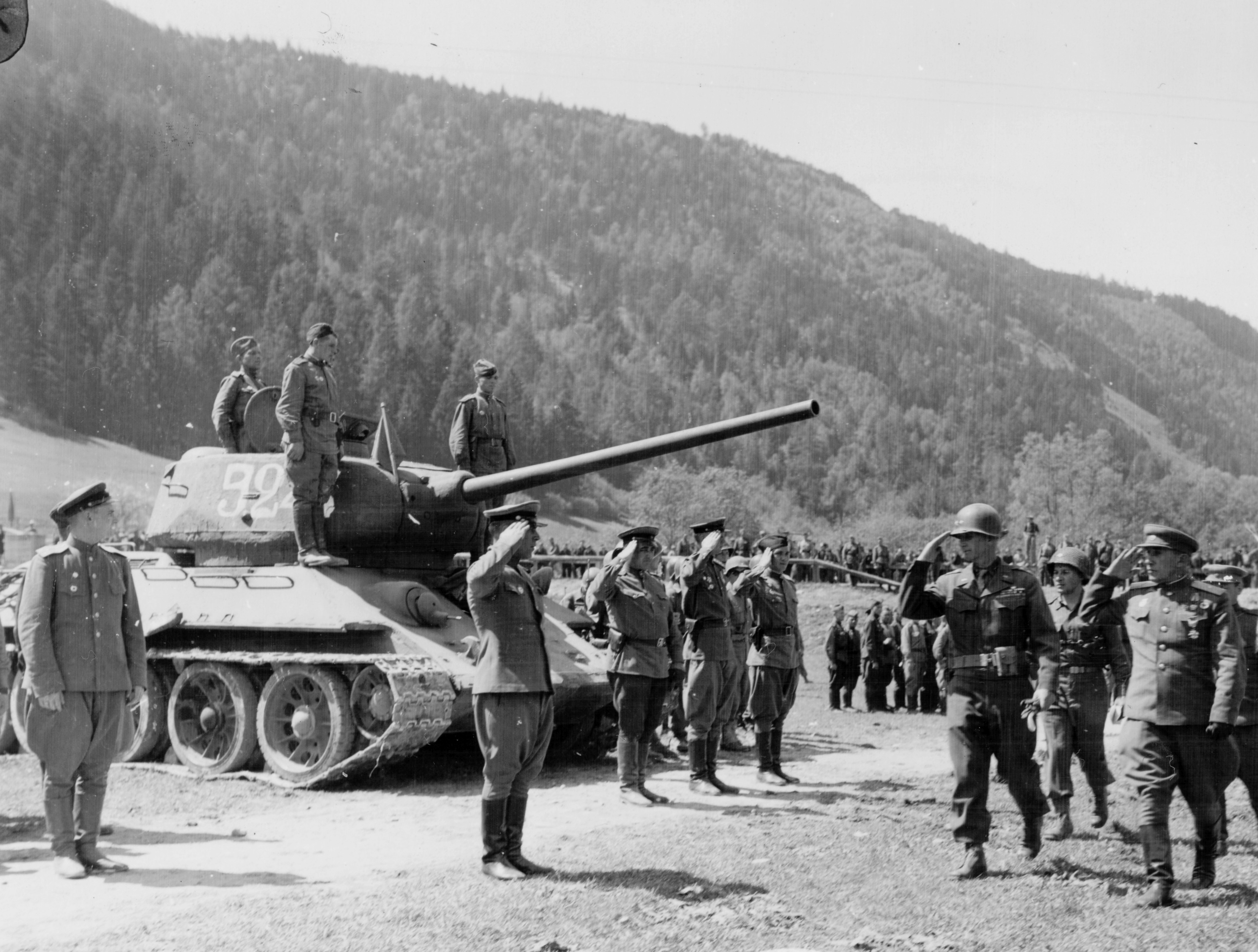
Division commander Major General Pavel Voskresensky and 80th Infantry Division commander Horace L. McBride inspecting Soviet troops, 11 May

For leading his platoon in repulsing Finnish attacks in early November, 326th Rifle Regiment Sergeant Vasily Poleshchuk was awarded the title Hero of the Soviet Union. Due to the relatively quiet nature of the front, the division's 109th Howitzer Regiment became a separate 7th Army regiment in early 1942. Around the same time, like other divisions in the front, it formed a ski battalion for winter patrolling and security duties. The division remained in the area until March 1944, when it was moved to the Arctic theatre of operations, to Kandalaksha. As part of the 19th Army it took part in defeating a group of German forces in the area of Alakurtti and reached the pre-war Soviet-Finnish border. By October it was part of the 14th Army, pushing German troops out of Finland and into northern Norway.

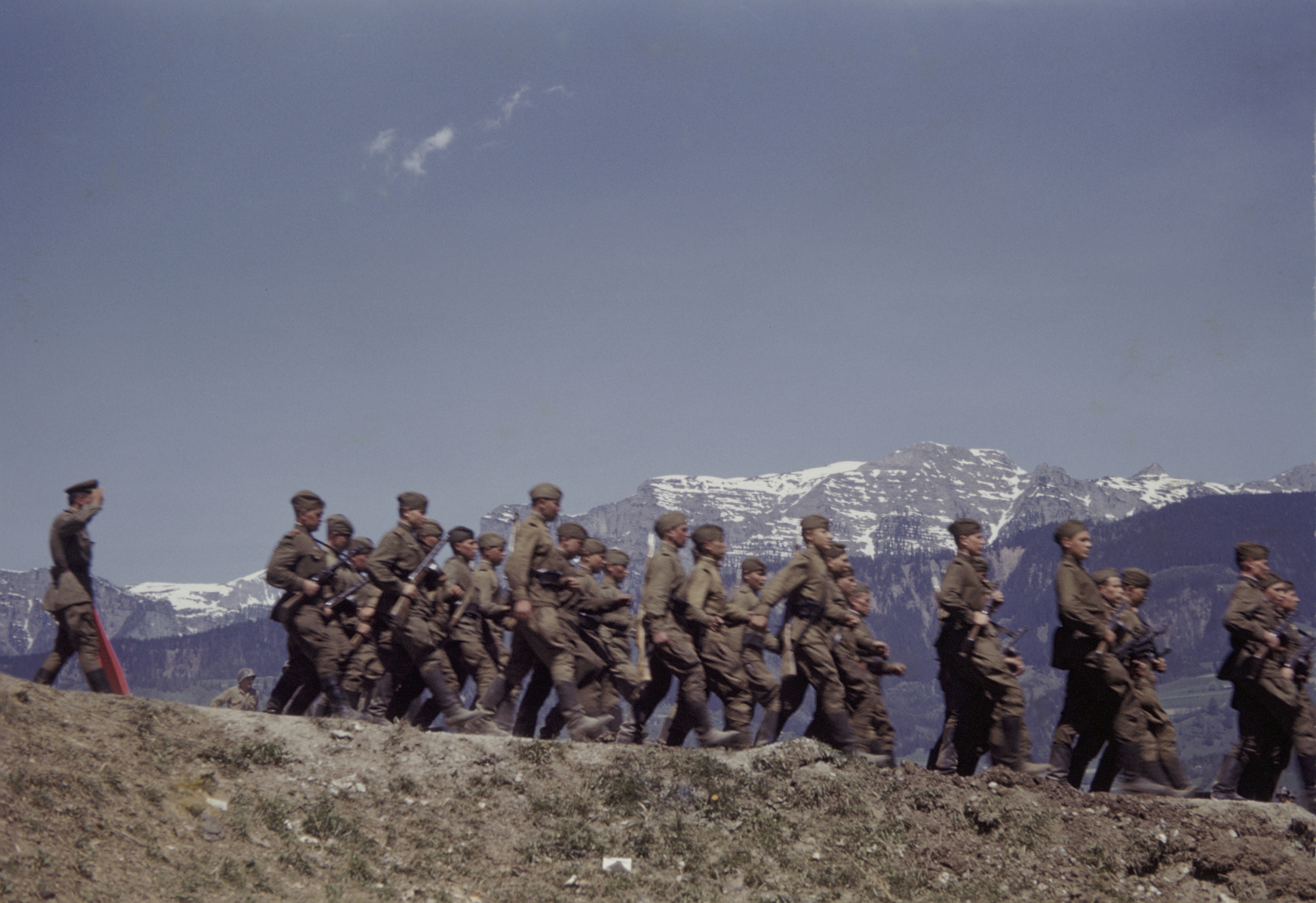
Soldiers of the 326th Rifle Regiment bring up the rear in an improvised parade to mark the Allied link-up, 15 May 1945

In January 1945 it was transferred to the 26th Army in Hungary, to defend against a German attack across the Leitha in the final stages of the Budapest Offensive. Surrounded on January 20 in the vicinity of Aba and Jakabszállás, the following day it broke through and reached friendly lines. On January 28 it received reinforcements and took part in the Soviet counter-offensive between Leithe and Danube. It later took part in defence against the Balaton Offensive and then the Vienna Offensive, operating from the town of Nagykanizsa. On May 10 it linked up with American troops from the 80th Infantry Division of XX Corps at the Enns.

== Postwar ==
Postwar, in October 1945, the division became the 20th Mechanized Division at Timișoara with the 57th Army. It soon moved to Arad. The division was originally intended to disband in the Southern Group of Forces. The order was changed and the 151st Rifle Division was disbanded instead. It later moved to Uryupinsk and became part of the 10th Mechanized Army. It disbanded on April 14, 1947. The division's 35th and 38th Tank Regiments became part of the 59th and 28th Guards Rifle Divisions, respectively.

== Commanders ==
The following commanders are known to have led the division:

- S.S. Shvansky (September 16–24, 1918)
- V.G. Damberg (September 24–October 28, 1918)
- Georgy Ovchinnikov (October 28, 1918 – July 2, 1920)
- Ivan Smolin (July 2–October 20, 1920)
- Konstantin Pyadyshev (October 20, 1920 – April 12, 1921)
- Kombrig Ivan Boryayev (November 1936–July 13, 1937)
- Kombrig Andrey Konovalov (March 26–May 8, 1941)
- Colonel (promoted to Major General October 14, 1942) Pyotr Gnedin (May 9, 1941 – December 8, 1943)
- Colonel Pyotr Anfimov (December 20, 1943 – March 20, 1944)
- Colonel Vladimir Arkhangelsky (March 25, 1944 – February 10, 1945)
- Colonel (promoted to Major General April 19, 1945) Pavel Voskresensky (February 11, 1945 – 1947)
