= North Caucasus Operation (1920) =

1920 offensive of the Russian Civil War

- Part of Southern Front of the Russian Civil War
Date	17 January – 7 April 1920
Location	North Caucasus
Result	Bolshevik victory

Belligerents
Russian SFSR	Russian State; Mountain Republic

Commanders and leaders
Vasily Shorin (to 24 January); Fyodor Afanasyev (acting from 24 January to 3 February); Mikhail Tukhachevsky (from 4 February)	(Russian State) Anton Denikin

Units involved
Caucasus Front	(Russian State) Armed Forces of South Russia

Strength
48,000 infantry; 23,000 cavalry; 500 guns; 2,700 machine guns	60,000 infantry; 32,000 cavalry; 450 guns; 1,200 machine guns

The North Caucasus Operation was a strategic offensive conducted by the Caucasian Front of the Red Army against the White Armed Forces of South Russia in the North Caucasus region between 17 January and 7 April 1920. It took place on the Southern Front of the Russian Civil War and was a Soviet attempt to destroy White resistance.

The operation ended with the defeat of the White forces in the North Caucasus and the evacuation of the remnants of the Volunteer Army, reduced to a corps, to Crimea. The Red Army advanced to the borders of Georgia and Azerbaijan by the end of the operation, which was followed by an invasion of Azerbaijan.

== Background ==
The operation was a continuation of the offensive of the Southern and Southwestern Fronts in 1919–1920. By mid-January 1920, the Caucasian Front of Vasily Shorin had advanced 500 kilometers from Taganrog, west of the Kalmyk Steppe, with a bridgehead on the Don at Bataysk and on the Sal south of Kotelnikovo. It included the 8th, 9th, 10th, and 11th Armies and the 1st Cavalry Army for a total of 214,800, with 47,600 infantry, 22,700 cavalry, 590 guns, and 2,732 machine guns in combat units. They pursued the Armed Forces of South Russia (AFSR) of Lieutenant General Anton Denikin, which included the Separate Volunteer Corps of Lieutenant General Alexander Kutepov, the Don Army of Lieutenant General Vladimir Sidorin, the Caucasus Army of Lieutenant General V.L. Pokrovsky, the Forces of the North Caucasus of General of Cavalry I.G. Erdeli, and the Forces of the Black Sea Governorate of Lieutenant General A.S. Lukomsky, for a total of 250,000, with 60,500 infantry, 31,600 cavalry, 450 guns, and up to 1,200 machine guns in combat units. Despite the near equivalency of both sides in troop strength, White morale had declined as they retreated to the North Caucasus.

== Prelude ==
The Soviet plan provided for the four armies of the right wing and center to launch a strong frontal attack towards Yekaterinodar along the line from the mouth of the Don to Sadovoe and destroy the White troops, preventing them from retreating towards the Kuban. On the left wing, the 11th Army was to simultaneously launch an offensive against Kizlyar and Svyatoy Krest. Subsequently, the offensive of the front was to be directed towards the center and left wing, using converging attacks to defeat the White troops in the central and southern North Caucasus and capture Stavropol, Mineralnye Vody, the Grozny oilfields, and Dagestan.

The main shock group of the Caucasus Front was composed of the 1st Cavalry Army of Semyon Budyonny, the 8th Army of Grigory Sokolnikov, the 9th Army of Alexander Stepin, the 10th Army of Alexander Pavlov, and the Consolidated Cavalry Corps of Boris Dumenko for a total of 29,000 infantry and 19,000 cavalry, with about 450 guns and more than 2,000 machine guns. It was tasked with defeating the Separate Volunteer Corps and the Don and Caucasus Armies, preventing them from gaining bridgeheads on the left banks of the Don and Sal, and preparing the way for an attack on the headquarters of Denikin at Tikhoretsk after reaching the line of Yeysk, Velikoknyazheskaya and Lake Lopukhovatoe. The shock group faced the main forces of the Armed Forces of South Russia, numbering 29,000 infantry, 25,000 cavalry, up to 440 guns, and about 1,100 machine guns. The AFSR commanders counted on the coming rasputitsa to halt the Red offensive on the lower course of the Don and Sal, then planned to bring up reserves and launch a counterattack.

== Don and Manych ==
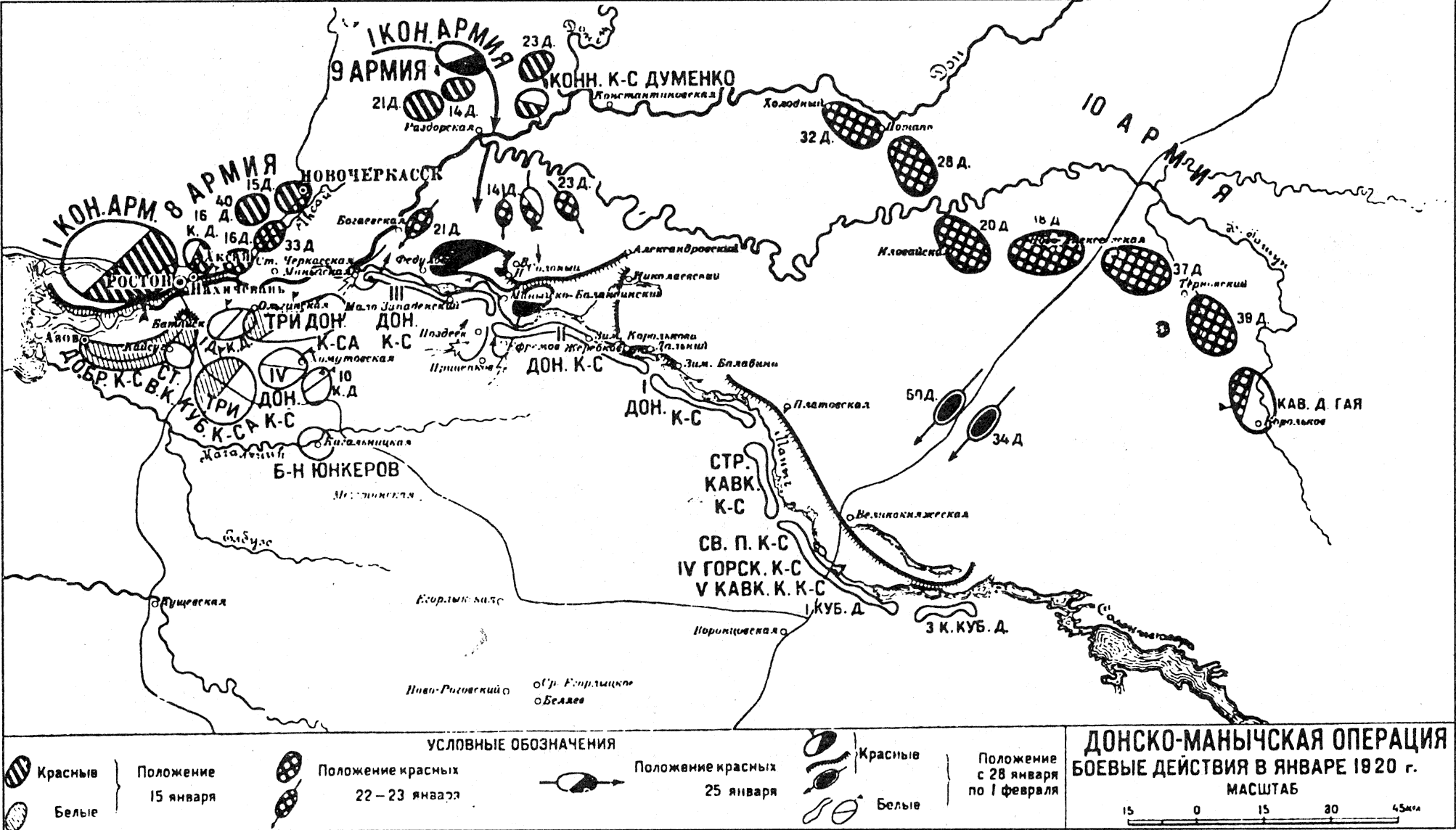
A map of the operation

The first phase of the offensive, described in Soviet historiography as the Don–Manych Operation, occurred between 17 January and 6 February. During the operation, the Caucasus Army retreated to the Manych in the face of the 40 to 60 kilometer-deep advance of the Red center and left wing. The greatest success was achieved by the 11th Army of Matvey Vasilenko who seized a bridgehead on the left bank of the Manych in the Divnoe area after outflanking the AFSR. Despite this, the Soviet troops failed to destroy the AFSR and reach their objectives, although the AFSR was forced to commit all of its operational reserves, which suffered heavy losses and were thoroughly exhausted in fierce fighting. On the left flank of the 11th Army, the 2nd Consolidated Brigade reached the Kuma and elements of the Expeditionary Corps of Yu.P. Butyagin took Svyatoy Krest on 25 January. Meanwhile, in the deep rear of the AFSR, 2,500 pro-Bolshevik partisans of the Red Army of the Black Sea under E.S. Kazansky disrupted White control.

At the beginning of February Denikin ordered the subordination of the Separate Volunteer Corps to the Don Army for a counterattack, but the Caucasus Front preempted this by resuming the advance.

== Tikhoretsk and Stavropol ==
The second phase of the offensive, described in Soviet historiography as the Tikhoretsk Operation, ran from 14 February to 2 March. During the operation, the Red attack decisively defeated the AFSR, splitting the White front in the North Caucasus in two and creating the conditions for the final attack. As a result, the strategic initiative in the Caucasus finally passed to the Red Army. To stave off complete defeat, Denikin began a retreat into the Kuban. Simultaneous with the Tikhoretsk Operation, the 11th Army cooperated with pro-Bolshevik partisans at Stavropol to carry out the Stavropol Operation, during which that city was taken on 29 February, and the Kuban Army (the renamed Caucasus Army) pushed back into the Kuban.

== Soviet pursuit ==
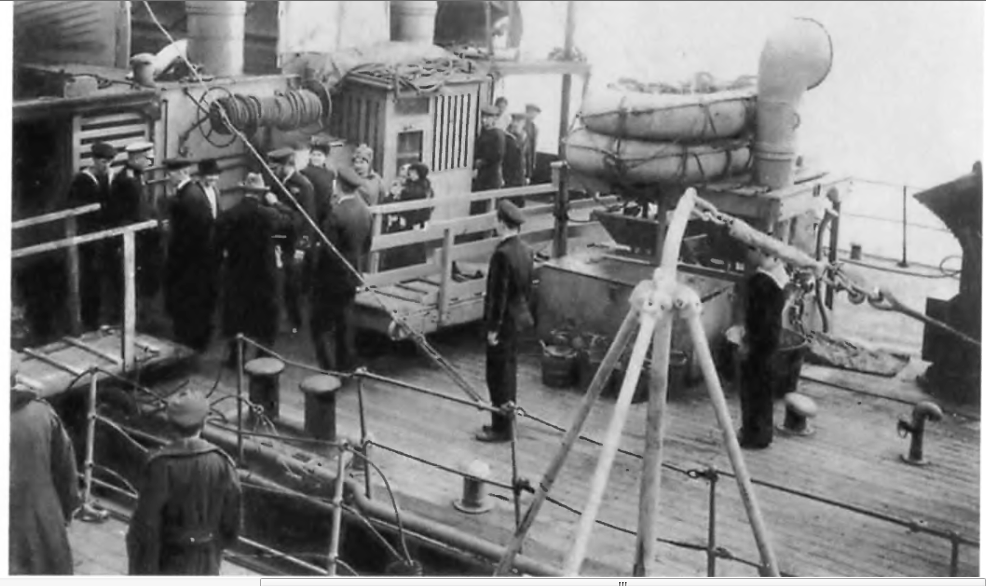
Denikin aboard a destroyer during the Novorossiysk evacuation

The third phase of the operation was defined in Soviet historiography as lasting from 3 March to 7 April. The main forces of the Caucasus Front conducted the Kuban–Novorossiysk Operation between 3 and 27 March, during which the defeat of the AFSR was completed in the North Caucasus. The 1st Cavalry Army captured Tikhoretsk on 9 March, then moved towards the Terek River. The 35,000-strong remnants of the Separate Volunteer Corps and parts of the Don Army evacuated from Novorossiysk to Crimea by 26 March. The core of the Don army evacuated from Tuapse. The final stage of the offensive of the 11th Army was also developed, along a 400-kilometer front. The troops of the army divided into three groups: the Stavropol towards Armavir, the Georgiyevsk towards Mozdok, and the Expeditionary Corps towards Petrovsk. On 17 March elements of the Stavropol Group took Armavir and Nevinnomyssk. As a result of the Red victories, pro-Bolshevik partisans in the Terek became active and captured Mineralnye Vody on 14 March. On the next day they took Pyatigorsk and held it until the approach of Red Army units.

In mid-March, the left flank units of the 10th Army (the 20th, 28th, and 32nd Rifle Divisions) reached Pyatigorsk, where they were operationally subordinated to the 11th Army. The command of the latter combined these with the Stavropol Group of Forces to form the Terek Group of the army on 18 March, tasked with advancing on Grozny and Vladikavkaz. Between 12 and 24 March the group conducted the Grozny operation, capturing that city on 24 March. On the same day, partisans supported by rebellious workers in Vladikavkaz seized that city and held it for six days until the approach of the Red Army units. The Soviet troops then advanced into Dagestan, where Derbent was occupied by partisans on 25 March and Petrovsk on 30 March by partisans and the Expeditionary Corps. As a result, by early April, the Dagestan operation of the 11th Army and partisans had captured the region from the AFSR. Simultaneously, Terek Oblast, Kabardia, North Ossetia, and Chechnya were occupied. The White strongholds of Fort Alexandrovsk and Chechen' Island on the Caspian, which had threatened Red communications, were also captured by two separate landing operations of the Caspian Flotilla of Fyodor Raskolnikov.

The final operation of the third phase was the Tuapse operation between 27 March and 7 April, during which the 9th Army, a cavalry brigade of the 1st Cavalry Army and partisans from the former Red Army of the Black Sea eliminated the Don Army and captured Tuapse on 7 April. Most of the latter surrendered, though remnants of the force retreated to Sochi, linking up with the Kuban Army. A 31,000-strong group of Kuban and Don Cossacks, with up to 30,000 refugees, was surrounded by Soviet troops in the area of Sochi, Adler, and Khosta. The Soviet blockade took place between the sea and the Georgian border against the last remaining large organized White force in the North Caucasus. By late April, about 12,000 Cossacks and 3,000 refugees had been evacuated to Crimea. The remainder surrendered between 4 and 7 May. Remnants of Cossacks moved into the mountains or crossed the Georgian border and were interned.

== Aftermath ==
In late April, the Caucasus Front advanced to the border of Georgia and Azerbaijan from the Black Sea to the Caspian, preceding the invasion of Azerbaijan. The front had captured an area of 296,000 square kilometers with a population of 6.91 million during the operation.

The operation resulted in the destruction of a large portion of the AFSR, one of the strongest threats to the Bolsheviks; Soviet troops reported the capture of 163,600 White soldiers and officers, 537 guns, 723 machine guns, 23 armored trains, seventeen tanks, thirty armored cars, about 3.4 million artillery shells, and 60 million cartridges, among others. The victory of the operation freed up large forces for the Polish–Soviet War and the Perekop–Chongar Offensive later that year. In Crimea, Denikin gave up command to Pyotr Wrangel on 4 April and went into exile.

For their actions in the operation, three rifle and three cavalry regiments of the Red Army were awarded the Honorary Revolutionary Red Banner along with a single artillery battery, while two regiments of the 21st Rifle Division received the Order of the Red Banner.

== See also ==
- Bibliography of the Russian Revolution and Civil War
- Outline of the Russian Revolution and Civil War
- Index of articles related to the Russian Revolution and Civil War
- The "Russian" Civil Wars, 1916–1926: Ten Years That Shook the World
- Russia in Flames: War, Revolution, Civil War, 1914–1921
- Russia in Revolution: An Empire in Crisis, 1890 to 1928
- Russia: Revolution and Civil War, 1917—1921
- The Russian Revolution: A New History
