= Caucasian Front (RSFSR) =

The Caucasian Front (Russian: Кавказский фронт) was a front of the Red Army during the Russian Civil War which existed between January 16, 1920 and May 29, 1921, and was the continuation of the Southeastern Front. The Front headquarters were located in Millerovo, and then in Rostov-on-Don. Its task was completing the liquidation of the North Caucasian group of Denikin's Army and conquering the Caucasus.

== Operations ==
The troops of the Caucasian Front conducted the Don–Manych Operation in January–February 1920. During the 2nd and 3rd stages of the North Caucasian operation it defeated the troops of Denikin and occupied the North Caucasus, seizing more than 100.000 prisoners, 330 guns and more than 500 machine guns.
In August–September 1920, the troops of the Caucasian Front defeated the White Ulagay's Landing in Kuban.

In Autumn 1920 - Spring 1921, the Caucasian Front established Soviet power in Baku, Tiflis, Kutaisi, Batumi, Erivan and the rest of Transcaucasia.

The Front was disbanded on May 29, 1921, and its troops and administration were transferred to the Separate Caucasian Army and the North Caucasian Military District.

== Composition ==
- 8th Army (Jan. 16 - March 20, 1920),
- 9th Army (Jan. 16, 1920 - May 29, 1921),
- 10th Army (Jan. 16 - July 4, 1920),
- 10th Terek-Dagestan Army (March 7 - May 29, 1921),
- 11th Army (Jan. 16, 1920 - May 29, 1921),
- 1st Cavalry Army (January 16 - March 18, 1920),
- Reserve Army (September–December 1920),
- Maritime Expeditionary Division (Aug.-Sept., Nov.-Dec. 1920),
- Ekaterinodar and Yeisk fortified areas,
- 2nd Aviation Fleet

== Commanders ==
=== Commanders ===
- Vasily Shorin (January 16–24, 1920)
- Fedor Afanasyev acting, (January 24 - February 3, 1920)
- Mikhail Tukhachevsky (February 4 - April 24, 1920)
- Ivar Smilga (April 24 - May 15, 1920)
- Vladimir Gittis (May 15, 1920 - May 29, 1921)

=== Members of the Revolutionary Military Council ===
- Valentin Trifonov (January 16, 1920 - May 29, 1921)
- Ivar Smilga (January 16 - May 21, 1920, January 26 - May 29, 1921)
- Sergey Ivanovich Gusev (January 16 - August 29, 1920)
- Sergo Ordzhonikidze (February 3, 1920 - May 29, 1921)
- Sergei Markov (June 22, 1920 - May 29, 1921)
- Arkady Rosengolts (August 23 - September 5, 1920)

=== Chiefs of Staff ===
- Fedor Afanasyev (January 16 - February 23, 1920)
- V. V. Lyubimov (February 23 - March 6, 1920)
- Semyon Pugachov (March 7, 1920 - May 29, 1921)
