= 10th Army (RSFSR) =

The 10th Army was a field army of the Red Army during the Russian Civil War which existed from October 3, 1918, until July 1920. It was formed from the troops operating in the area of Tsaritsyn and Kamyshin. On May 4, 1920, it was renamed the 10th Terek Army. It was dissolved in July 1920. It was part of the Southern Front, the South-Eastern Front (from October 1, 1919) and the Caucasian Front (since January 16, 1920).

== History ==
Position of the 10th Army in summer 1919

In October 1918 - January 1919, the Army fought defensive battles against the Don White Cossacks near Tsaritsyn, opposing the offensive of the Don Army under General Pyotr Krasnov. Since mid-February 1919, it participated in the 1918-1919 Counteroffensive of the Southern Front, during which it defeated the Voronezh group of the Don Army in cooperation with the 9th Red Army. This forced the Tsaritsyn group of the Don Army to hastily retreat behind the Manych River.

Since May 1919, the 10th Army was attacked by numerically superior forces of the Caucasian Army under General Pyotr Wrangel. Under heavy pressure on its flanks, it was forced to withdraw to the Tsaritsyn area, and then further to Kamyshin where it took part in the defense of Tsaritsyn. On July 23, 1918, the 10th Army became part of the Special Group of Vasilii Shorin and fought in the August Counteroffensive of the Southern Front, defeating parts of the Caucasian Army of General Wrangel and entering the area around the middle reaches of the Don River.

In October 1919, as part of the Southeastern Front, it continued to conduct stubborn defensive battles against White troops in the Kamyshin region, making by its actions the counteroffensive of the Southern Front possible, which aimed to destroy the troops of General Anton Denikin. In the second half of November 1919 the 10th Army participated in the general offensive of Soviet troops in the south of the country, during which it defeated parts of the opposing Caucasian Army and reoccupied Tsaritsyn on January 3, 1920.

In January - March 1920, it participated in the North Caucasian operation.
In the spring and summer of 1920, it continued to lead a successful offensive South of the Don River and, in cooperation with the 9th and 11th Red Army, conquered the areas around Stavropol, completing the defeat of the White Guards in the Northern Caucasus.

Since May 4, 1920, the Army was renamed the 10th Terek Red Army of the Caucasian Front. Since April 1920, it fought against anti-Soviet forces in the Terek region, until the Army was disbanded in July 1920.

=== Commanders ===
- Kliment Voroshilov (October 3 - December 18, 1918)
- Nikolai Khudyakov (18 - 26 December 1918)
- Alexander Yegorov (December 26, 1918 - May 25, 1919)
- Leonid Klyuev (May 26 - December 28, 1919)
- Alexander Pavlov (December 28, 1919 - June 20, 1920)
- Vasily Glagolev (June 20 - July 8, 1920)

=== Chief of Staff ===
- Valery Mezhlauk (October 28, 1918 — June 4, 1919)
- Boris Legran (December 26 — May 7, 1919)
- Nikolai Podvoisky (January 31 — March 18, 1920)

=== Members of the Revolutionary Military Council include ===
- Ernest Appoga
- Minin S.K. (October 21 - November 1918, July - September 23, 1919)
- Mezhlauk V.I. (October 28, 1918 - June 4, 1919)
- Okulov A.I. (October 26 - December 26, 1918)
- Shchadenko E.A. (November 1918 - January 1919)Legrand B.V. (December 26, 1918 - May 7, 1919)
- Efremov M.E. (January 28 - August 31, 1919)
- Somov O. I. (April 18 - October 20, 1919)
- Znamensky A.A. (June 11, 1919 - July 4, 1920)
- Mikhailov B.D. (18 August 1919 - 5 June 1920)
- Podvoisky N.I. (January 31 - March 18, 1920)
- Kvirkelia V.M. (May 30 - July 8, 1920)

== Sources ==
- Гражданская война и военная интервенция в СССР. Энциклопедия. М.: Советская энциклопедия, 1983.
- Центральный государственный архив Советской армии. В двух томах. Том 1. Путеводитель. ЦГАСА, 1991 С. 323—325
