= 2nd Army (RSFSR) =

The 2nd Army was a field army of the Red Army during the Russian Civil War. The 2nd Army was formed twice. The first formation was between the beginning of March 1918 and April as a reaction to the Austro-German occupation of Ukraine. The second formation was created on June 18, 1918, as a part of the Eastern Front. The Army was disbanded on July 16, 1919.

== History ==
On March 17, 1918, the Second All-Ukrainian Congress of Soviets decided to create armed forces to counter foreign and contra-revolutionary forces. Five armies of some 3.000 -3.500 men were created. In fact, these armies were only brigades with limited combat capabilities. Evgenii Venediktov became the commander of the 2nd Army. In March 1918, it defended Yekaterinoslav and then retreated to the Donbass. By the beginning of April, there were 1,000 bayonets in the army and a small number of cavalry. Together with parts of the 1st Army, she took part in skirmishes in Ukraine in the Chaplino area near Millerovo, after which one part of the army withdrew to Tsaritsyn, and the other to Kalach and Voronezh where it was disbanded.

On June 18, 1918 the 2nd Army was created a second time from the detachments of the Orenburg and Ufa groups. It was part of the Eastern Front.
In June - July 1918 it fought in the basin of the Kama and Belaya rivers against White Guards troops. On August 5, 1918, units of the 2nd Army launched an offensive and cut off the Nurlat - Bugulma railway, but then came under a White counterattack and retreated to Menzelinsk and Sarapul.

In August 1918, because of the Izhevsk–Votkinsk Uprising, it retreated to the area around Arsk, Vyatskiye Polyany and Menzelinsk, north of Votkinsk. It participated in the offensive of the Eastern Front 1918-1919 and led the attack in the Kazan and Izhevsk-Votkinsk operations (September-November 1918). The 2nd Army launched an attack on the Sarapul - Krasnoufimsk sector (November 1918), acted against the Perm Group of Alexander Kolchak's Army (December 1918) and fought near Kungur and Osa between December 1918 and February 1919.

In March-May 1919, during the Spring Offensive of the White Russian Army it retreated to the area of the Vyatka River. In May-June 1919, the 2nd Army participated in the Counteroffensive of the Eastern front and during the Sarapul–Votkinsk Operation, the 2nd Army occupied Izhevsk (June 7) and the Votkinsky Plant (June 11). In the course of the further offensive, it conducted the Perm and Yekaterinburg operations, taking Kungur (July 1) and Yekaterinburg (July 14).

The 2nd Army was disbanded on July 16, 1919, and the army administration was transferred to the Southern Front and became the administration of Special Group Shorin.

== Leadership ==
=== Commanders ===
- Vasily Yakovlev (until June 26, 1918, defected to the White Army)
- Fedor Makhin (June 26 - July 3, 1918, defected to the White Army)
- A. I. Kharchenko (July 3 - 4, 1918, defected to the White Army)
- V.N. Blokhin (July 14 - September 3, 1918)
- Ivan Maksimov (Acting. September 3-27, 1918)
- Vasily Shorin (September 28, 1918 - July 16, 1919)

=== Members of the Revolutionary Military Council include ===
- Sergey Ivanovich Gusev
- Pavel Shternberg
- Grigori Sokolnikov
- Mirsaid Sultan-Galiev
