= Southeastern Front (RSFSR) =

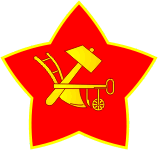
Russian Civil War Red Army

The Southeastern Front (Russian: Юго-Восточный фронт) was a front of the Red Army during the Russian Civil War which existed between 30 September 1919 and 16 January 1920. The Front headquarters were located in Saratov.

== Operations ==
The front had the task of defeating Denikin's forces on the Novocherkassk - Tsaritsyn line and occupying the Don Host Oblast.

The Front troops conducted in October 1919 defensive battles against the cavalry of Konstantin Mamontov on the Khopyor River, in the vicinity of the villages of Ust-Medveditskaya, Ilovlinskaya and Kamyshin.

Since November 1919 they participated in a strategic offensive, together with the Southern Front.
In November-December 1919 they conducted the Khopyor-Don Operation, in which the river Khopyor was crossed and Novokhopyorsk, Uryupinsk and Kalach taken. On 3 January 1920, after a series of battles, Tsaritsyn was occupied.
During the Rostov-Novocherkassk Operation, the Front forces further defeated the White Don Army and on 7 January 1920 they occupied Novocherkassk.

The Front was disbanded on 16 January 1920 and replaced by the Caucasian Front.

== Composition ==
- 9th Army
- 10th Army
- 11th Army (from 14 October 1919)
- 8th Army (from 10 January 1920)
- 1st Cavalry Army (from 10 January 1920)
- Volga-Caspian Military Flotilla

== Commanders ==
Commander :

- Vasily Shorin

Chief of Staff :

- Fedor Afanasyev (until 4 January 1920)
- Semyon Pugachov (4-16 January 1920)

Members of the Revolutionary Military Council:

- Ivar Smilga
- Valentin Trifonov
- Sergey Ivanovich Gusev
