= Izhevsk–Votkinsk Uprising =

Failed anti-bolshevik uprising during russian civil war

Izhevsk-Votkinsk Uprising
- Part of Russian Civil War
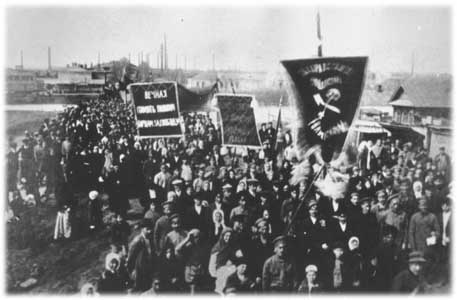
- Demonstration of Izhevsk workers
Date	8 August – 12 November 1918
Location	Izhevsk and Votkinsk, Russia
Result	Red Army victory: Rebels fled and joined the White Army

Belligerents
(Russian Soviet Federative Socialist Republic) Red Army	Rebels

Commanders and leaders
(Russian Soviet Federative Socialist Republic) Woldemar Azin (Russian Soviet Federative Socialist Republic) Vasily Shorin	Colonel D.Fedichkin

Casualties and losses
Unknown	About 25,000

Izhevsk–Votkinsk Uprising (8 August – 12 November 1918) was an anti-Bolshevik uprising in the Prikamye region during the Civil War in Russia.

== Background ==
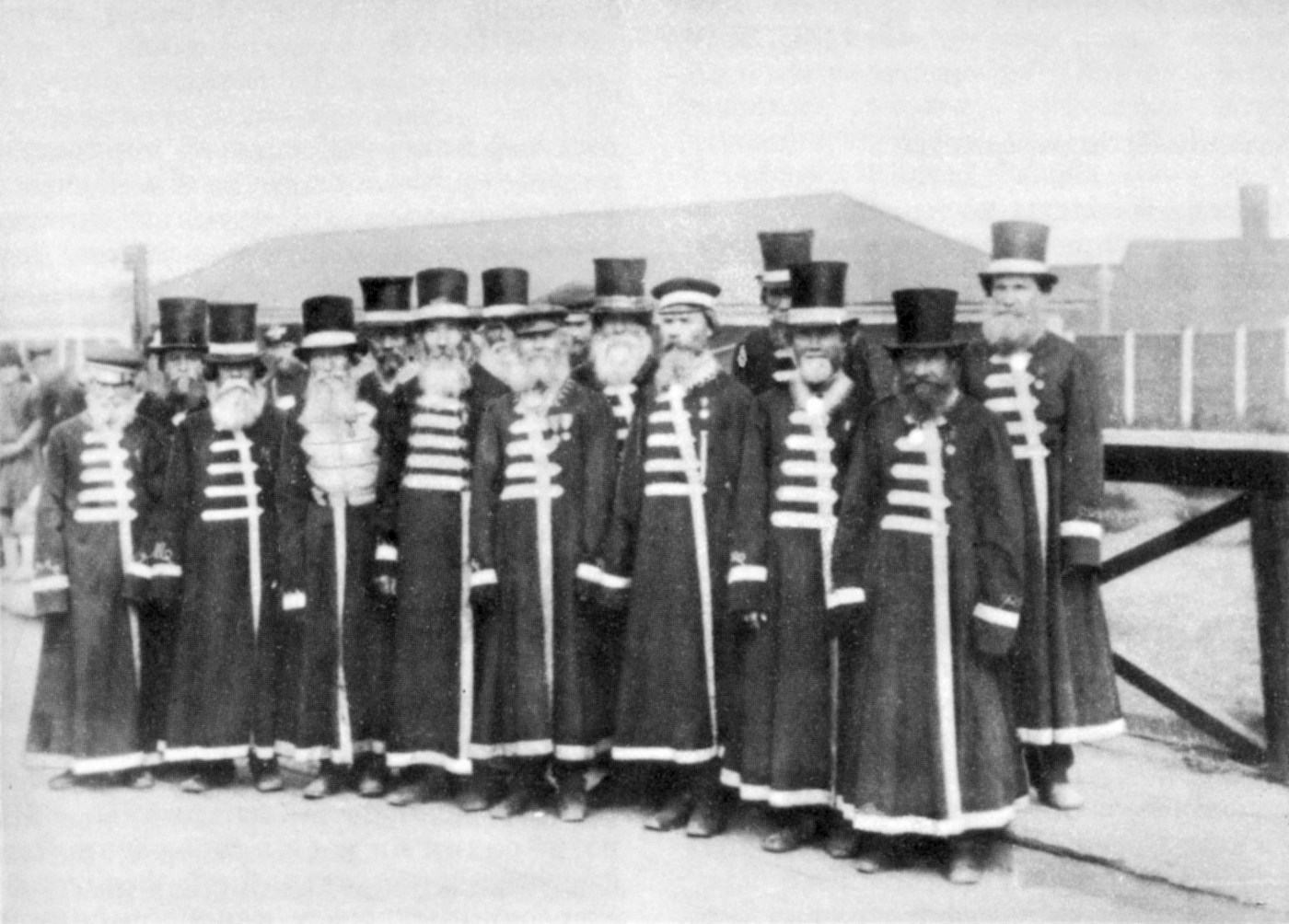
Foremen of Izhevsk weapon factory, 1880s

Izhevsk and Votkinsk were important centers of military production in Russian Empire. Workers of the state military factories and members of their families were about 73-74% of the cities' populations, and many families had an old tradition of working in military industry. Workers at military factories had a good salary; many of them owned pieces of land, used for agriculture.

After the February Revolution of 1917, political life in Izhevsk and Votkinsk began to develop very fast. On 4 May, the Izhevsk committee of Russian Social Democratic Labour Party split into Bolshevik and Menshevik factions. In the summer, Izhevsk became one of the main centres of the Union of Socialists-Revolutionaries Maximalists. In the first half of 1918 in Izhevsk there were two political blocks: Bolsheviks and Socialists-Revolutionaries Maximalists against Mensheviks and right-wing Socialists-Revolutionaries. In May and June, the Bolsheviks and Maximalists lost elections in the city's Council; after that they used military force to disperse the City Council.

The Union of the Veterans of World War I supported the right-wing Socialists. There were about 4,000 members of the Union in Izhevsk, many of them had firearms at home.

== Uprising ==
On 6 August, Kazan was captured by the White Army. Most Bolsheviks and Maximalists from Izhevsk were sent to the front lines. On 7 August, the Bolsheviks organized a big meeting for drafting the workers into the Army. The workers said that they would go to the army if they would be organized together in groups (not dispersed through different units), and if the Bolsheviks organized aid for worker's families, etc. The Bolsheviks refused.

On 8 August, the uprising began. Workers took firearms from the factory's stores, and officers from the Veterans' Union began to organize workers in military units (at the middle of September there were about 15,000 soldiers in the Izhevsk Army). At that time there were less than 100 Bolsheviks in the city; they understood that it would be impossible to defend the city and retreated. The rebels organized a new Izhevsk Soviet (city council).

Workers from Votkinsk asked Izhevsk for help, because they had no firearms. Izhevsk sent a detachment; each soldier in this detachment carried two rifles. With the help from Izhevsk, Votkinsk was captured by rebels at 17 August. After this, the Izhevsk Soviet transferred power to the Kama region KOMUCH (named in accord with Samara's KOMUCH), headed by N. Yevseev.

The Bolsheviks did not have enough troops for crushing the rebellion and fighting against the White Army at the same time, but they understood the necessity of preventing the connection of the People's Army of Komuch with the resources of Izhevsk's military factories. During August–September, the Red Army fought against the White Army near Kazan, and rebels used this time for spreading the rebellion.

On 11 September, Kazan was captured by Red Army. After this, the Bolsheviks began to use more troops against rebels. Living conditions in rebel territory became worse, and workers didn't receive wages. Some rebel troops preferred to change sides.

After organising a Provisional All-Russian Government on 23 September, the Kama region KOMUCH was dissolved, and N. Yevseev became a special commissar of the Provisional Government. At the beginning of the rebellion, the Izhevsk Army had been built up from volunteers; now it became a conscript army.

At the beginning of October, the 2nd Red Army captured Sarapul and began to prepare for storming Izhevsk. The main battle took place on 7 November, to the south of the city. The rebels didn't have enough ammunition and organized so-called "psychological attack": they advanced by ceremonial march with music, with rifles but without shooting. Some red troops retreated, others came into hand-to-hand combat. Both sides had big losses. The rebels had to leave their fortified lines and retreat to the town of Izhevsk. They understood that there were not enough forces for defending the city, and retreated to Votkinsk during the night. On 8 November, the 2nd Red Army entered Izhevsk, and Votkinsk on 11 November.

== Aftermath ==
Rebel troops forced the Kama river and became a part of the Western Army of White Movement as Izhevsk Division and Votkinsk Division. After losing the civil war, many White soldiers from Izhevsk and Votkinsk went to Manchuria and the United States.

== Sources ==
- Н.Е.Какурин, И.И.Вацетис "Гражданская война. 1918-1921" (N.E.Kakurin, I.I.Vacietis "Civil War. 1918-1921") - Sankt-Peterburg, "Polygon" Publishing House, 2002. ISBN 5-89173-150-9
