= Southern Front counteroffensive =

- Part of the Southern Front of the Russian Civil War
Date	14 August – 12 September 1919
Location	Don Host; Voronezh; Kursk
Result	White victory

Belligerents
AFSR	Russian SFSR Red Army

Commanders and leaders
Anton Denikin	Vladimir Yegoryev

Strength
144,000	185,000

Casualties and losses
Unknown	10,000 killed

The August counter-offensive of the Southern Front (14 August – 12 September 1919) was an offensive during the Russian Civil War by the troops of the Southern Front of the Red Army against the White Guard troops of Anton Denikin. Combat operations were conducted by two offensive groups, the main blow was aimed towards the Don region. The troops of the Red Army were unable to carry out the assigned task, but their actions delayed the subsequent offensive of Denikin's army.

== Prelude ==
On 3 July 1919, Anton Denikin issued a directive for an offensive against Moscow, planning to inflict the main blow by the Volunteer Army through Kursk, Orel, and Tula. Red Army troops conducted defensive battles on a front of some 1,400 kilometers (870 mi) long and by the beginning of August were able to stop the advance of the Whites at Novoukrainka, Romodan, Oboyan, Liski, Borisoglebsk, north Kamyshin, Vladimirovka and Chyorny Yar. After this, the Red troops began to prepare to launch a counter-offensive.

According to Peter Kenez, "The great defeats forced the Bolsheviks to pay closer attention to the Southern front. Since Kolchak was already in retreat, they began to transfer some of their troops there from the East. Trotskii now spent most of his time in the South." Though opposed by Trotskii, Sergey Kamenev implemented a plan that involved attacking through Tsaritsyn, Novocherkassk, and Rostov.

== Alignment of forces and plan of attack ==
By 15 August, the number of troops of the Southern Front of the Red Army, commanded by Vladimir Yegoryev, was 150,500 bayonets (infantry), 15,000-18,000 sabers (cavalry), 719 guns, and 3,197 machine guns. In the fortified areas there were an extra 35,000 bayonets and sabers, 129 guns, 184 machine guns, and more than 50,000 soldiers in reserve.

The AFSR forces operated under the general command of General Anton Denikin, and were composed of the Don Army, commanded by General Vladimir Sidorin; the Caucasus Army, commanded by General Pyotr Wrangel; and part of the Volunteer Army, commanded by Vladimir May-Mayevsky. The total number of these troops was 100,960 bayonets, 43,250 sabers, and 303 guns.

The main blow in the upcoming offensive was planned to be inflicted on Novocherkassk and Rostov-on-Don by the left flank of the Southern Front, in particular the Special group of Vasily Shorin composed of the 9th and 10th armies and the Cavalry Corps of Semyon Budyonny – 52,500 bayonets, 2,500-3,500 sabers, 314 guns, and 1,227 machine guns. An auxiliary strike against Kupiansk was to be executed by the Special Group of Vladimir Selivachyov composed of the 8th Army, 3rd and 42nd Infantry Division of the 13th Army – 49,700 bayonets, 3,900-4,200 sabers, 268 guns, and 1,381 machine guns. The total length of the front of the offensive was 760 kilometers (470 mi). The 14th Army was to support the offensive of Selivachev's group, by attacking Lozovaya.

The beginning of the counter-offensive of the Red Army was scheduled for 2–5 August, but by that time the preparation was not completed because of the slow transfer of reinforcements, reserves, weapons, ammunition and food supplies to the Southern Front. The planned grouping of troops did not provide sufficient forces and means yet to launch the attack.

The White Command became aware of the impending counteroffensive and preventive measures were taken. On 10 August, the White Guard 4th Don Cavalry Corps, under Konstantin Mamontov, broke through the Red front at the junction of the 8th and 9th Armies, and started operating in the rear of the Southern Front around Tambov. The actions of Mamontov's cavalry made it very difficult for the Red Army to prepare and execute the counter-offensive.

== Progress of the operations ==
=== Actions of the Shorin group ===
On 14 August, the troops of the Shorin group, with the support of the Volga detachment of the Volga-Kama flotilla—16 boats, five cannodoks, one floating battery—launched an offensive against the Don Army and the Caucasian Army, which numbered 12,300 bayonets, 21,900 sabers, 93 guns, and 249 machine guns. The troops of the 10th Army in cooperation with the Cavalry corps of Budyonny conducted an offensive against Kamyshin and Tsaritsyn, while the 9th Army attacked Ust-Khopyorskaya. By the end of August, the Cavalry corps of Budyonny had defeated General Sutulov's Cossack Division and together with the 10th Army struck a blow against the White troops in the village of Serebryakovo-Zelenovskaya, capturing four armored trains.

In early September, heavy fighting for Tsaritsyn unfolded. On 5–8 September, the troops of the 10th Army and units of the Cavalry Corps of the Budenny continued to attack. Under strong White fire, they stormed several times the trenches and wire fences, but due to heavy losses were forced to stop the offensive. On 9 September, White troops launched an offensive by large infantry and cavalry forces with the support of 12 batteries, armored cars and tanks against the 10th Army, and in the course of fierce fighting in several sectors forced parts of the 10th Army to retreat. By 11 September, active fighting around Tsaritsyn stopped.

The command of the Southern Front decided to withdraw the Cavalry corps of Budenny from the 10th Army, in order to send him to Novokhopersk against Mamontov's Cavalry corps. At the same time, the commander of a newly formed cavalry corps, Filipp Mironov, decided independently to march to the front against the troops of Denikin. This step was seen as rebellion, and the forces of the Cavalry corps of the Budyonny were sent to suppress it. On 13 August, Mironov was arrested, and his 500 men were disarmed.

The offensive of the Ninth Army developed slowly because of the stubborn resistance of the Don Army. Only by 21 August, the 9th Army troops achieved a breakthrough and began to encroach upon parts of rivers Khopyor and Don. On 12 September, the troops of the Ninth Army crossed the Khopyor River and managed to advance 150 to 180 kilometers (93 to 112 mi). Further advance down the Don Bend failed.

=== Selivachev group ===
On 15 August, Selivachev's group launched an offensive against a part of the Don Army and the right wing of the Volunteer Army, which numbered 20,500 bayonets, 9,200 sabers, 69 guns, and 208 machine guns. The main blow was inflicted by the Strike group—3rd and 42nd infantry divisions and cavalry brigade of the 13th Army, 12th, 15th, 16th, and 13th infantry divisions of the 8th Army—at the junction of the Don and Volunteer armies. The remaining divisions moved in echelons and covered the flanks. The White troops had a strong right flank and an extended center.

By 27 August, the troops of the left flank of the Selivachev group had advanced 60 kilometers (37 mi), occupying Novy Oskol, Biryuch and Valuyki. On the right flank they advanced to Belgorod. In the center, after advancing 150 kilometers (93 mi), they approached Kupiansk, and came within 40 kilometers (25 mi) from Kharkov.

By 1 September, the group's troops reached the line of Volchansk–Kupiansk–Valuyki–Podgornoy station – north of Rossosh. However, the offensive of the Selivachev group happened without interaction with the Shorin group, along divergent lines, with put the Red troops at a disadvantage. Furthermore, the Mamontov group operated in the rear, breaking up communications and logistic support to both groups.

The White Army concentrated large forces on the flanks of the Selivachev group and on 26 August, went on the offensive. From the Belgorod area to Koroch and Novy Oskol, two divisions of the 1st Army Corps under Alexander Kutepov, and the 3rd Kuban Cavalry under General Shkuro, attacked. From the Karpenkov district—Krasnoe, Samoteevka, Biryuch—the 8th Plastun and 2nd Don divisions struck. With these attacks, the White Army tried to surround the main forces of Selivachev's group and defeat them. The Red troops stubbornly defended themselves by the flanks of the 12th and 42nd Infantry Divisions, and by 15 September, retreated to the Seym River, southwest of Stary Oskol and north of Novy Oskol. The 14th Army, in order to assist the Selivachev group, attempted to launch an offensive by crossing the Seym River, but did not achieve success and retreated.

== Results ==
According to Peter Kenez, "After six weeks of heavy fighting Shorin's troops were beaten, remaining capable only of passive defense. The Don army and units from the Volunteer Army first stopped the troops of Selivachev and then pursued them, capturing a large amount of territory."

The August counteroffensive of the Southern Front of the Red Army did not achieve its goals. This was due to a number of reasons : in particular the lack of forces in the offensive groups, especially cavalry, and also the diversion of an important number of forces to fight the Mamontov Cavalry. The choice of the main attack in the direction of the Don region forced the Red forces to act in an environment with a hostile attitude of the local population. The advance of the two groups of the Southern Front was carried out in separate directions and in time, this enabled the White Army to repel them separately.

Nevertheless, the counteroffensive of the Red Army delayed the offensive of the Volunteer Army against Kursk and Orel, distracting the main forces of the Don Army and Caucasus Army. The Red forces also managed to maintain communications between central Russia and the eastern regions of the country, ensuring the delivery of food and reserves from the east.

== See also ==
- Bibliography of the Russian Revolution and Civil War
- Outline of the Russian Revolution and Civil War
- Index of articles related to the Russian Revolution and Civil War
- The "Russian" Civil Wars, 1916–1926: Ten Years That Shook the World
- Russia in Flames: War, Revolution, Civil War, 1914–1921
- Russia in Revolution: An Empire in Crisis, 1890 to 1928
- Russia: Revolution and Civil War, 1917—1921
- The Russian Revolution: A New History
