= West Siberian rebellion =

Rebellion

West Siberian Rebellion
- Part of the Russian Civil War
Date	January 31, 1921 – December 1922
Location	West Siberia (Tyumen, Omsk, Chelyabinsk, Sverdlovsk), Northern Kazakhstan
Result	Green armies tactical victory: Uprising suppressed

Belligerents
Russian Soviet Socialist Republic	Green armies

Commanders and leaders
Ivan Smirnov; Vasily Shorin; Ivan Pavlunovsky; Makar Vasiliev	A. S. Korotkov †; Vasily Zheltovsky †; Stepan Danilov; Vladimir Rodin †

Strength
	c. 100,000

The West Siberian rebellion was the largest of the Russian peasant uprisings against the nascent Bolshevik state. It began in early 1921 and was defeated at the end of 1922, due in part to the brutal repression of the militarily superior Red Army, and the famine that the region suffered.

== Background ==
At the beginning of the 20th century, the Russian peasantry experienced two wars against the Russian state, both the product of revolutions and both ended with the imposition of state power: 1905–1907 and 1917–1922.

=== Rebellions in Central and Eastern Siberia against whites ===
The rebellious peasants were always enemies of the whites. The latter refused to accept land tenure reform and wanted revenge on the villagers for expropriating the land themselves in 1917. Admiral Aleksandr Kolchak made the fatal mistake of winning the animosity of peasants, by restoring the rights of landowners. Many Siberian villagers were descendants of Russian and Ukrainian immigrants who had fled from serfdom and had a strong love for their freedom.

The guerrillas began shortly after the formation of their government, on August 31, 1918, in the rural areas near Slavgorod, Altai. But the problem worsened in early 1919. The White Army began to carry out grain requisitions and a military draft, but most of their recruits deserted and numerous rear-guard revolts broke out (encouraged by Bolshevik activists, anarchists and left-wing SRs). Taiga guerrillas were often led by deserters and sometimes joined scattered Red soldiers when the whites conquered the region in 1918, setting out to ambush units and cut off supply lines. Kolchak resorted to terror to pacify them.

Last months of the Kolchak regime, with the withdrawal of his units, the revolts against him and the Soviet advance.

With its rear weakened by the wear and tear of the guerrillas and being forced to distract its detachments in defending themselves against the peasantry, the white regime could not stop the advance of 200,000 Bolsheviks, who, on the other hand, knew how to add local partisans to their forces wherever they advanced. At the end of 1919, when the Siberian regime was totally defeated and disintegrated, the autonomous bands from Central Siberia to Amur Oblast numbered more than 100,000 combatants. (Note: The USSR did not use as many guerrillas again until the "Great Patriotic War". Between 1941 and 1943, they went from 30,000 to 200,000, and in 1944 at least 200,000 to 250,000 and perhaps up to 350,000 partisans fought in the west of the USSR and the east of Poland against Nazi Germany. These partisans included 20,000 to 25,000 Jews, apart from 10,000 family members who had lived with them in the camps and survived the Holocaust. Similar movements were experienced in other countries under German occupation: 200,000 in France, 200,000 in Italy and 300,000 in Yugoslavia.)

=== Fall of Kolchak and Bolshevik advance ===
When his forces withdrew in 1920, Kolchak faced numerous mutinies that joined the guerrillas, leaving his loyal few completely alone and condemned. The Eastern Front of the Red Army, under the command of Major General Vladimir Olderogge and formed by 70,000 soldiers, seized Tyumen and Kurgan and then attacked Petropavlovsk on August 25. In response, 58,000 targets commanded by General Mikhail Diterikhs fought back, seizing Tobolsk and driving the Bolsheviks across the Tobol River. On October 14 with 75,000 soldiers, Olderogge ordered a new offensive, forcing the 56,000 whites to withdraw from Petropavlovsk on October 29. Diterikhs suffered 5,000 dead and 8,000 prisoners. After the defeat, the Bolshevik advance became unstoppable, as did the peasant guerrillas. Nearly 100,000 whites were killed, captured or deserted in the following months. Omsk, Novosibirsk, Tomsk, Krasnoyarsk and Irkutsk all fell into their hands. In early February 1920, after the Great Siberian Ice March 25,000 surviving white soldiers entered Irkutsk and soon fled to Chita. The withdrawal of the Japanese from Chitá, on October 21, 1920, and the consolidation of the Republic of the Far East made the guerrillas disappear from the region.

Between the late 1920s and early 1921, with the foreseeable defeat of the White Movement, the Red Army was in charge of subduing the unruly rural world. The latter was disunited in various movements led by its own atamans.

== Rebellion ==
On January 31, 1921, a small revolt broke out in the village of Chelnokovskom, in the Ishim province, which soon spread to the neighboring regions of Tyumen, Akmola, Omsk, Chelyabinsk, Tobolsk, Tomsk and Yekaterinburg, causing the Bolsheviks to lose control of Western Siberia, from Kurgan to Irkutsk. It was the largest green uprising, both by the number of rebels and their geographic extension, and perhaps the least studied. They dominated a population of three million four hundred thousand people. Its causes were the aggressive searches carried out by the 35,000 soldiers of the "prodotriady" installed in Siberia after the defeat of Kolchak and the violation of peasant democracy, since the Bolsheviks falsified the elections in the regional volost. The main leaders of these bands were Semyon Serkov, Václav Puzhevsky, Vasily Zheltovsky, Timoféi Sitnikov, Stepan Danilov, Vladimir Rodin, Piotr Dolin, Grégory Atamanov, Afanasi Afanasiev and Petr Shevchenko. In charge of the Red revolutionary military council of the region was Ivan Smirnov, Vasili Shorin, Checkist Ivan Pavlunovsky and Makar Vasiliev.

Although sources vary the total number of peasants in arms from 30,000 to 150,000. Historian Vladimir Shulpyakov gives the figure of 70,000 or 100,000 men, but the most likely figure is 55,000 to 60,000 rebels. Many Cossacks from the region joined. They controlled a total of twelve districts and occupied the cities of Ishim, Beryozovo, Obdorsk, Barabinsk, Kainsk, Tobolsk and Petropavlovsk, and seized the Trans-Siberian Railway between February and March 1921.

The desperate courage of these rebels led to a terrible campaign of repression by the Cheka. The President of the Party in Siberia, Ivan Smirnov, estimated that up to March 12, 1921, 7,000 peasants had been murdered in the Petropavl region alone and another 15,000 in Ishim. In the town of Aromashevo, between April 28 and May 1, the Red troops faced 10,000 peasants; 700 Greens died in combat, many drowned in rivers when they fled, and 5,700 were captured with many weapons and loot. For another two days the greens were endlessly hunted. The victory allowed the Reds to regain control of the north of Ishim. Indeed, with these actions, together with the establishment of permanent garrisons, revolutionary committees and an espionage network, the capture of several leaders - granting amnesties in exchange for handing over former comrades, mass executions, taking hostages of family members, and artillery bombardments of entire villages, the major operations ended and the rebels turned to guerrilla warfare. In December 1922 reports stated that "banditry" had all but disappeared.

== End ==
The abandonment of the Prodrazvyorstka and the adoption of the New Economic Policy (NEP) was key to its submission. The last insurgent foci were crushed at the end of 1922 in Ishim, after a ferocious repression and a devastating famine that wiped out the farmers. New anti-communist guerrillas would only emerge with the invasion of Nazi Germany. (Note: During the occupation of the Baltic Republics in 1940 the Soviets sent 25,000 soldiers to Estonia, 30,000 to Latvia and 20,000 to Lithuania. Guerrilla fighting in the Baltics lasted from 1945 until 1952 and had 100,000 Lithuanian, 40,000 Latvian and 30,000 Estonian partisans hidden in the forests. There was also the Ukrainian Insurgent Army, active until 1949.)

== See also ==
- Russian Civil War
- Green armies
- Tambov Rebellion
- Makhnovshchina
- Pitchfork uprising
- Kazym rebellion
- Peasant rebellion of Sorokino

== Bibliography ==
- Adams, Simon (2008). Occupation and Resistance. New York: The Rosen Publishing Group. ISBN 9781404218581. OCLC 1043465093.
- Avrich, Paul (2014). Kronstadt, 1921. Princeton: Princeton University Press. ISBN 978-1-4008-5908-5. OCLC 1154891046.
- Bouchard, E. A. (2003). ИЗ ИСТОРИИ ТЮМЕНСКОГО ПРИКАЗА О ССЫЛЬНЫХ (1869—1904). Словцовские чтения (in Russian). Тюменский областной краеведческий музей. pp. 38–40.
- Brovkin, Vladimir N. (2015). Behind the Front Lines of the Civil War: Political Parties and Social Movements in Russia, 1918-1922. Princeton: Princeton University Press. ISBN 978-0-691-03278-8. OCLC 922803678.
- Bullock, David (2012). The Czech Legion 1914-20. Oxford: Osprey Publishing. ISBN 978-1-78096-458-4. OCLC 843342846.
- Conquest, Robert (1987). The Harvest of Sorrow: Soviet Collectivization and the Terror-famine. New York: Oxford University Press. ISBN 978-0-19-505180-3. OCLC 1023952466.
- Figes, Orlando (1996). A people's tragedy : the Russian Revolution 1891-1924. London: Jonathan Cape. ISBN 9780712673273. OCLC 874877216.
- Forsyth, James (1994). A History of the Peoples of Siberia: Russia's North Asian Colony 1581-1990. Cambridge: Cambridge University Press. ISBN 978-0-521-47771-0. OCLC 1139000292.
- Heaton, Colin D. (2008). Steve Greer (ed.). Occupation and Insurgency: A Selective Examination of the Hague and Geneva Conventions on the Eastern Front, 1939-1945. Algora Publishing. ISBN 9780875866109. OCLC 940909400.
- Hosking, Geoffrey A. (1993). The First Socialist Society: A History of the Soviet Union from Within. Harvard University Press. ISBN 978-0-674-30443-7. OCLC 1071014586.
- Klimin, Ivan Ivanovich (2004). Российское крестьянство в годы Гражданской войны: 1917-1921 (in Russian). СПб.
- Levine, Allan (2010). Fugitives of the Forest: The Heroic Story Of Jewish Resistance And Survival During The Second World War. Guilford: Rowman & Littlefield. ISBN 9781461750055. OCLC 1024122574.
- McGuire Mohr, Joan (2012). The Czech and Slovak Legion in Siberia, 1917-1922. McFarland. ISBN 9780786488513. OCLC 794364549.
- Misiunas, Romuald J.; Taagepera, Rein (1983). The Baltic States, Years of Dependence, 1940-1980. University of California Press. ISBN 9780520046252. OCLC 8346304.
- Naumov, Igor V. (2006). David Collins (ed.). The History of Siberia. Nueva York: Routledge. ISBN 978-1-134-20703-9. OCLC 77732892.
- Nenarokov, Albert Pavlovich (1968). Russia in the twentieth century: the view of a Soviet historian. New York: Morrow. OCLC 318253260.
- Phillips, Steve (2000). Lenin and the Russian Revolution. Oxford: Heinemann. ISBN 978-0-435-32719-4. OCLC 1023264761.
- Poliakov, Yuri Aleksandrovich (1987). The Socialist Revolution and Its Defense: Early History of Soviet Russia. Translated by Garb, Paula. Moscow: Progress Publishers. OCLC 988294564.
- Roberts, Paul Craig; LaFollette, Katharine (1990). Meltdown: Inside the Soviet Economy. Washington DC: Cato Institute. ISBN 978-1-937184-18-6. OCLC 782878336.
- Safonov, Dmitri A (1998). "Сафонов Д.А. Великая крестьянская война 1920-1921 гг. и Южный Урал" (in Russian). Orenburg.
- Shishkin, Vladímir Ivánovich (2001). Западно-Сибирский мятеж 1921 года: историография вопроса. Бахрушинские чтения 2001 г. Межвузовский сборник научных трудов. (in Russian). Vol. II. Novosibirsk: Universidad Estatal de Novosibirsk. pp. 137–175.
- Shulpyakov, Vladimir Aleksandrovich (2004). Гибель Сибирского казачьего войска. 1920-1922. Книга Ii (Россия забытая и неизвестная) (in Russian). Центрполиграф. ISBN 5-9524-0847-8. OCLC 878580370.
- Smith, David J. (2002). The Baltic States: Estonia, Latvia and Lithuania. London: Routledge. ISBN 978-0-41528-580-3. OCLC 492619709.
- Stackelberg, Roderick (2002). Hitler's Germany: Origins, Interpretations, Legacies. London: Routledge. ISBN 9781134635290. OCLC 263595234.
- Werth, Nicolas (1999). "1. A State against its People: violence, repression, and terror in the Soviet Union". The Black Book of Communism. Cambridge: Harvard University Press. ISBN 978-0-674-07608-2. OCLC 949773841.
