= Southern Front (RSFSR) =

- Red Army insignia of the Civil War period
- Active: 1st formation: September 1918–January 1920; 2nd formation: September–December 1920
- Country: Russian Soviet Federative Socialist Republic
- Branch: Red Army
- Type: Front
- Engagements: Russian Civil War

Commanders
- Notable commanders: Alexander Yegorov; Mikhail Frunze

The Southern Front (Russian: Южный фронт) was a front of the Red Army during the Russian Civil War, formed twice.

The front was first formed in September 1918, fighting against the White Don Cossacks and the Volunteer Army in southeastern Russia. It advanced into the North Caucasus in January 1919, but was forced to retreat from eastern Ukraine by an attack of the Armed Forces of South Russia (AFSR) in May and June. The Southern Front then retreated in the face of the latter's Moscow offensive, launching a counterattack in August that advanced into northeastern Ukraine and to the Don River. With its rear disrupted by White cavalry raids, the front retreated north in September and early October, moving as far as Orel. In October the front launched a counteroffensive, defeating the AFSR, leading to the latter's precipitate retreat to the Black Sea by early January. The front was redesignated the Southwestern Front on January 10, 1920, at the beginning of the Red advance into the North Caucasus.

The front was formed for a second time in September 1920, with troops transferred from the Southwestern Front. It fought in the defeat of Pyotr Wrangel's Russian Army in Crimea, forcing the evacuation of the latter in November with the Perekop–Chongar operation. The front was disbanded in December, reorganized into the Armed Forces of Ukraine and the Crimea.

== 1st formation ==
=== Formation ===
The Southern Front was first formed by an order of the Revolutionary Military Council on 11 September 1918, which replaced the Red Army's organization into screens with fronts, under the command of Pavel Sytin. It included all troops previously part of the Bryansk and Kursk areas of the Western Screen, the Voronezh, Povorino, and Balashov-Kamyshin areas of the Southern Screen, the Red Army of the North Caucasus, and the Astrakhan Group of Forces. It is referred to in some sources as the Southern Front against Krasnov and Denikin to distinguish it from the front's 2nd formation. The front headquarters was formed from units of the Southern Screen headquarters and its Military Council from the Military Council of the North Caucasus. It was initially based at Kozlov. When it was first formed, the front was tasked with maintaining the demarcation line between the Red Army and Austro-German troops in Ukraine, and fighting Pyotr Krasnov's Don Cossack Host and Anton Denikin's Volunteer Army in southeastern Russia. On 3 October, the front's sector was divided into five areas, which were reorganized as

- 8th Army : from the Bryansk, Kursk, and Voronezh regions of screen forces, on the Yevstratovka and Kalach directions,
- 9th Army : units on the Povorino and Balashov directions,
- 10th Army : units on the Kamyshin and Tsaritsyn directions,
- 11th Army : units of the Western region of the North Caucasus,
- 12th Army : units of the Eastern region of the North Caucasus, when the Red Army formed numbered field armies.

=== Tsaritsyn and advance into the North Caucasus ===
Between September and November, it defended against Don Cossack attacks on Tsaritsyn and Kamyshin, in the area of the Povorino-Tsaritsyn railway, and towards Voronezh. Due to the 11th and 12th Armies in the North Caucasus being cut off by White advances from the rest of the front, on 2 November, the two armies were subordinated to the Caspian-Caucasian Section of the Southern Front. It launched a failed offensive in November, which resulted in the replacement of Sytin with Latvian Rifleman Pēteris Slavens on 9 November. On 8 December, the Caspian-Caucasian Section became the independent Caspian-Caucasian Front.
The Group of Forces on the Kursk direction, formed on 18 November, was subordinated to the front on 19 December. The front achieved success in a January 1919 offensive against the Don Army, advancing along the Tsaritsyn-Velikoknyazheskaya railway and reaching the Don. On 24 January, Vladimir Gittis replaced Slavens. The Group of Forces on the Kursk direction was renamed the Donetsk Group of Forces on 15 February, and was expanded into the 13th Army on 5 March.
On 13 March, the Don River Flotilla was operationally subordinated the front, remaining with it until its disbandment on 28 June. Between March and June, the front fought to suppress the Vyoshenskaya uprising of the Don Cossacks in stanitsas on the Upper Don. By April, it had taken Rostov-on-Don, crossed the Manych River, and advanced towards Bataysk and Tikhoretsk. On 27 April the 2nd Ukrainian Soviet Army joined the front; it became the 14th Army on 4 June.

=== Retreat from Ukraine ===
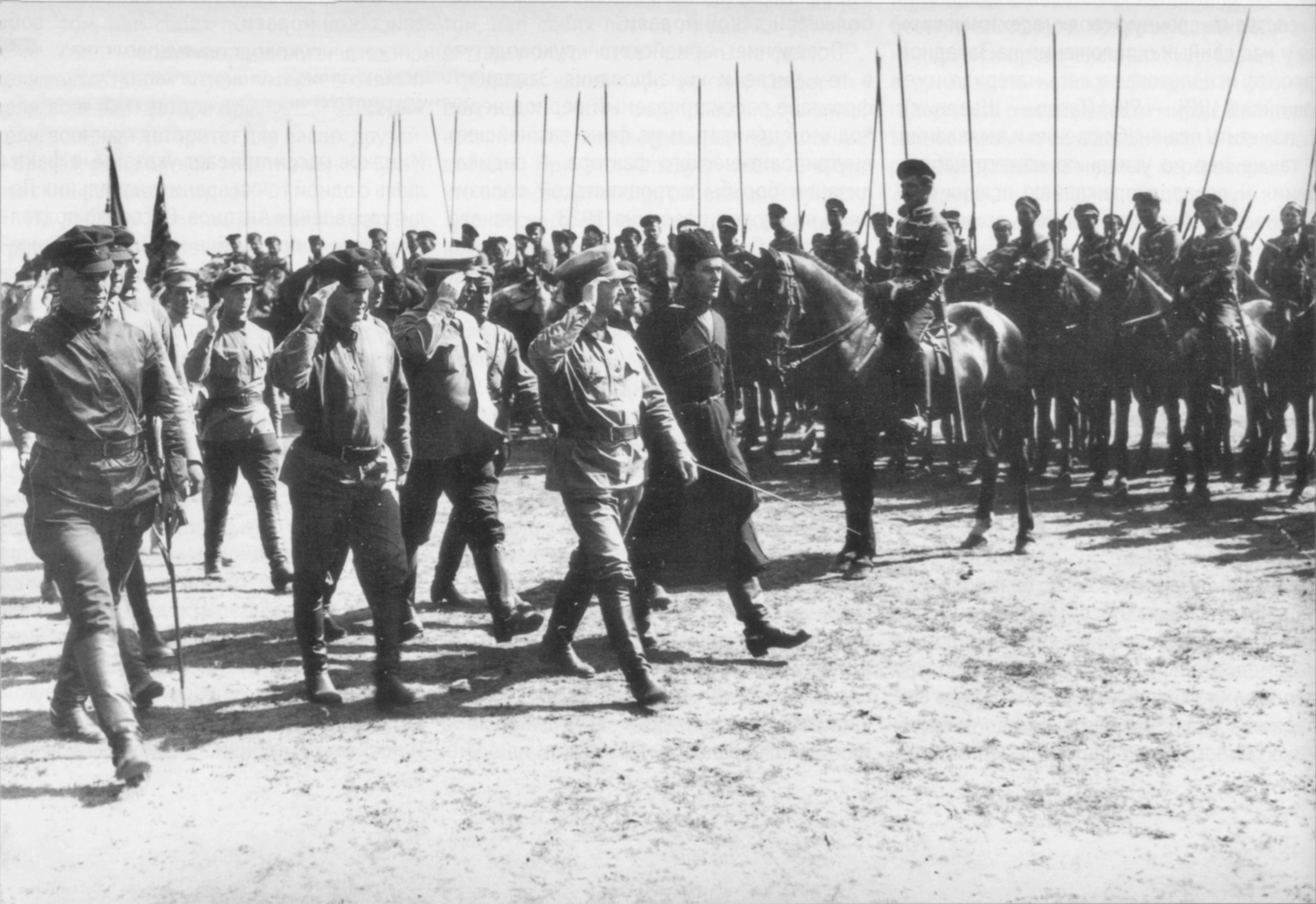
Revolutionary Military Council Chairman Leon Trotsky reviewing front troops at Kharkov at the end of May or early June 1919

In May, the Armed Forces of South Russia (AFSR) launched an offensive, which forced the front to retreat from the Don Host Oblast, the Donbas, Kharkov, Belgorod, Balashov and Tsaritsyn.
On 21 May, the 11th Separate Army and Astrakhan-Caspian Flotilla were subordinated to the front; the former disbanded on 4 June with its 34th Rifle Division and 7th Cavalry Division being transferred to the 10th Army. Between 8 June and 10 January 1920, the Orel Military District was operationally subordinated to the front.
On 17 June, the Special Corps was subordinated to the front. It had been formed on 10 June as the Separate Expeditionary Corps from troops assigned to suppress the Vyoshenskaya uprising, but was disbanded on 1 July.

On 28 June, the Ukrainian Group of Forces was formed from the 12th Army (2nd formation, transferred from the Western Front) and 14th Army, as well as the troops of the Kharkov Military District military commissariat for combat on the left bank of the Dnieper. It was led by the 12th Army commander Nikolai Semyonov. After the army was transferred on 26 July, the group was dissolved.

Southern Front positions at start of Denikin's Moscow offensive

=== Fighting the Moscow offensive ===
On 13 July, Gittis was replaced by Vladimir Yegoryev. On 23 July, the Commander-in-Chief of the Armed Forces of the Republic ordered that the 9th and 10th Armies become a shock group directly subordinated to him for the main attack against the AFSR towards Rostov and Novocherkassk. However, on 27 July, the group, renamed the Special Group and commanded by Vasily Shorin, was operationally subordinated to the front. The front then retreated in the face of Denikin's Moscow offensive, relinquishing Kiev, Odessa, Kursk, Voronezh, and Orel between August and October. In August, the front headquarters moved to Orel. By orders of 5 and 13 August, a group under the command of Vladimir Selivachyov, named after its commander, was formed from troops of the 8th and 13th Armies and the Voronezh Fortified Region for the secondary attack against the AFSR towards Kharkov. Between 14 August and 12 September, the front launched a counterattack known as the August counteroffensive of the Southern Front utilizing the Special Group and the Selivachyov Group. Its forces attacked towards Kharkov, capturing Biryuch, Valuyki, Volchansk, Kupyansk, and Pavlovsk, reaching the Don and Khopyor Rivers, and defended in the area of Tsaritsyn and Kamyshin.

However, the raids of Don Cossack cavalry commanders Konstantin Mamontov and Andrei Shkuro disrupted the front's rear, and through September and early October the front retreated to the north again, giving up Kursk, Livny, Kromy, and Orel. By late September Group Selivachyov had ceased to exist under the pressure of the White advance. The front headquarters relocated north to Tula during the month due to the AFSR advance. The 9th and 10th Armies, still part of the Special Group of the front, became the basis of the new Southeastern Front on 30 September.
On 1 October, the Outer Southern Defense Region was created by the front, uniting the Yelets, Kozlov, and Tambov Fortified Regions to defend the southern approaches to Moscow in the Orel Governorate and parts of the Kursk, Tambov and Chernigov Governorates. During the month, the front headquarters relocated to Sergiyevsk, and then Serpukhov, ahead of the White advance. Semyon Budyonny's Cavalry Corps was transferred to the front's 10th Army on 7 October.

=== Defeat of the Armed Forces of South Russia ===
On 11 October, it commenced a counteroffensive, with the Orel–Kursk operation and Voronezh–Kastornoye operation. Alexander Yegorov took command of the front for the counteroffensive, and led it for the rest of its existence. During the Orel–Kursk operation between 11 October and 18 November, the front's forces recaptured Kromy, Orel, Fatezh, Sevsk, Lgov, Dmitriyev, and Kursk. The Voronezh–Kastornoye operation between 13 October and 16 November retook Voronezh, Liski, and Kastornoye. The front's counteroffensive forced the AFSR into a headlong retreat. The 12th Army rejoined the front on 16 October. On 25 October, with the defeat of the AFSR, the Outer Southern Defense Region was disbanded and its troops used to form the 61st Rifle Division. The Cavalry Corps was redesignated the 1st Cavalry Corps of the front on 30 October, and became the 1st Cavalry Army on 17 November.

Advancing in tandem with the Southeastern Front from November, the Southern Front fought in the Kharkov operation between 24 November and 12 December, capturing Stary Oskol, Novy Oskol, Sumy, Biryuch, Volchansk, Valuyki, Kupyansk, Belgorod, Kharkov, and Pavlovsk. In the Donbas operation, it crossed the Seversky Donets, capturing Izyum, Slavyansk, Bakhmut, Debaltsevo, Gorlovka, Ilovaysk, Konstantinovka, Lugansk, and Mariupol. The front pushed the Armed Forces of South Russia back to the Black Sea and North Caucasus by early 1920, and moved its headquarters forward to Kursk in early January. Its troops inflicted heavy losses on the Armed Forces of South Russia, and fought in the Rostov–Novocherkassk Operation between 3 and 10 January, capturing Taganrog, Novocherkassk, Rostov-on-Don, and Tikhoretsk, reaching the Sea of Azov. It was redesignated as the Southwestern Front on 10 January 1920, with the 1st Cavalry and 8th Armies transferred to the Southeastern Front, and the 12th, 13th, and 14th Armies remaining with the Southwestern Front.

=== Commanders ===
- Pavel Sytin : 11.09.1918 — 09.11.1918
- Pēteris Slavens : 09.11.1918 — 24.01.1919
- Vladimir Gittis : 24.01.1919 — 13.07.1919
- Vladimir Yegoryev 13.07.1919 — 11.10.1919
- Alexander Yegorov : 11.10.1919 — 10.01.1920

== 2nd formation ==
The second formation of the Southern Front was formed by an order of the Revolutionary Military Council on 21 September 1920, with its headquarters at Kharkov. Under the command of Mikhail Frunze for the duration of its existence, the front is referred to in some sources as the Southern Front against Wrangel to distinguish it from the 1st formation. It was tasked with fighting Pyotr Wrangel's Russian Army, which had advanced out of Crimea into the Northern Taurida. From its formation, the front included the 6th and 13th Armies and the 2nd Cavalry Army, which were transferred from the Southwestern Front. It also included the Kremenchug, Yekaterinoslav, and Primorsky Fortified Regions, the last responsible for defending the Black Sea coast. A key role in front operations was played by Nestor Makhno's anarchist Revolutionary Insurrectionary Army of Ukraine.

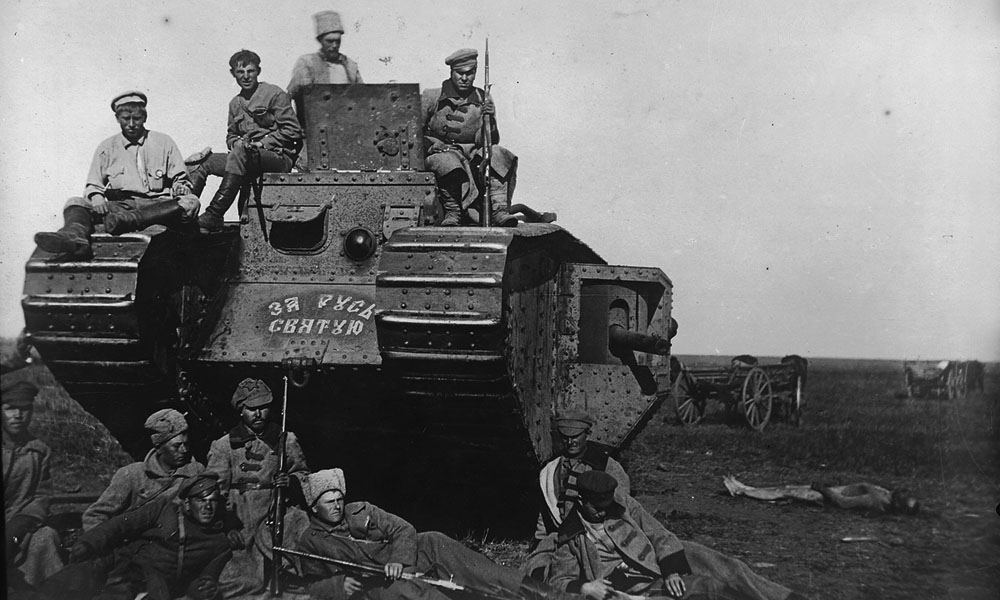
British-made Mark IV tank used by White Army, captured 14 October 1920 in the Kakhovka bridgehead

In September and October, the front fought against the Russian Army in northern Taurida, repulsing its attacks towards the Donbas, Nikopol and Aleksandrovsk, which aimed at creating a bridgehead on the Dnieper's right bank. The troops of the front held the Kakhovka bridgehead on the river's left bank. On 21 October, the 1st Cavalry Army was transferred to the front from the reserve of the Commander-in-Chief, and the 4th Army was formed by the front. In a counteroffensive in northern Taurida between 28 October and 3 November, the front's troops advanced out of the Kakhovka bridgehead, capturing Perekop, Henichesk, Agayman, Melitopol, Nizhniye Serogozy, Salkovo, and Chongar.

A map of the Soviet plan for the Perekop–Chongar operation

During the Perekop–Chongar operation between 7 and 17 November it broke through Russian Army defenses on the Isthmus of Perekop, crossing the Sivash and capturing the Lithuanian peninsula, the fortified Turkish Wall, Yushun, and Chongar positions. After breaking through at Perekop, the front advanced into Crimea, capturing Simferopol, Feodosiya, Sevastopol, Kerch, and Yalta, forcing the Russian Army to evacuate. On 12 November the 13th Army was disbanded and its troops merged with the 4th Army. The 2nd Cavalry Army was reduced to a corps on 6 December. On 10 December, in accordance with an order of 3 December, the front headquarters was reorganized into the headquarters of the Commander of the Armed Forces of Ukraine and the Crimea, with the 4th, 6th, and 1st Cavalry Armies.
