= 9th Army (RSFSR) =

The 9th Army was a field army of the Red Army during the Russian Civil War which existed from October 3, 1918, until June 22, 1921.

== History ==
Position of the 9th Army in summer 1919

The Ninth Army was created on October 3, 1918, from the Povorinsky and Balashovo-Kamyshin sectors of the Southern Front. It was part of: the Southern Front until October 1, 1919, South-Eastern Front until January 16, 1920, the Caucasian Front until May 29, 1921, and then the North Caucasian Military District. On May 4, 1920, the 9th Army was renamed the 9th Kuban Army.

In October–December 1918, the 9th Army fought the Don Army of General Krasnov in the districts of Povorino, Elan and Balashov. In January - March 1919 it participated in the Offensive of the Southern Front and occupied Borisoglebsk and Novokhopersk. From March, it suppressed the Vyoshenskaya Uprising in its rear and conducted defensive battles against Denikin's troops in the Donbas.
The 9th Army was part of the Special Group of Vasilii Shorin (July 23 - September 30, 1919) and participated in the August Counteroffensive of Southern Front, then held the defense on the Khopyor River against the advancing Don Army. In November–December 1919 she participated in the offensive of the Southeastern Front, crossed the Don and Northern Donets and took Millerovo and Lihuyu.

In January 1920, the army led an offensive in the Rostov-Novocherkassk Operation. In January–April she fought in the Northern Caucasus Operation to complete the defeat of the Denikin's armies, the Dono-Manych operation (January 17-February 6, 1920), the Tikhoretsky Operation (February–March 1920), and the Kuban-Novorossiysk Operation (March 3-March 27, 1920) in which Yekaterinodar and Novorossiysk were taken.

Then the 9th Army pursued the remains of Denikin's troops in the area of Tuapse and Sochi. In August–September 1920, it fought to liquidate the Ulagay's Landing force in the Kuban and the Taman Peninsula, against the "Army of the Renaissance of Russia" under General Fostikov and other White Guard formations in the western part of the Northern Caucasus. In February - March 1921 the Army fought on the Black Sea coast against the armed forces of the Georgian Democratic Republic.

== Commanders ==
=== Commanders ===
- Alexander Yegorov (September 28 - November 25, 1918)
- Pavel Knyagnitsky (November 25, 1918 - June 6, 1919),
- Nikolai Vsevolodov (June 6–16, 1919), defected to the Whites,
- Aleksander Stepin (June 16, 1919 - February 9, 1920),
- A. A. Dushkevich (February 9 - March 1, 1920),
- Ieronim Uborevich (March 1 - April 5, 1920),
- Matvei Vasilenko (April 5 - July 19, 1920),
- Mikhail Lewandowski (July 19 - October 5, 1920),
- V.N. Chernyshev (October 5 - November 21, 1920)
- Mikhail Lewandowski (November 21, 1920 - January 26, 1921)
- V.N. Chernyshev (January 26 - April 22, 1921),
- Mikhail Lewandowski (April 22 - June 13, 1921),
- I. F. Sharskov (June 13–22, 1921).

=== Chief of Staff ===
- Ilya Garkavyi (April 20 - May 8, 1919)

=== Members of the Revolutionary Military Council include ===
- Grigori Sokolnikov
- Alexander Beloborodov
