= Sergey Ivanovich Gusev =

Russian revolutionary and politician

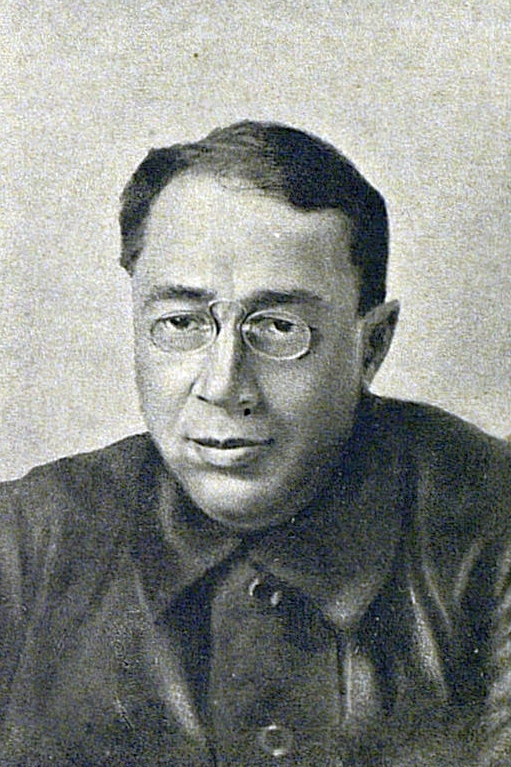
Gusev in 1905

Sergei Ivanovich Gusev (AKA "Gussev") (Russian: Серге́й Ива́нович Гу́сев) (real name - Yakov Davidovich Drabkin: Russian — Я́ков Дави́дович Дра́бкин) (1 January 1874 – 10 June 1933) was a Russian revolutionary, a founding member of the Bolshevik faction of the Russian Social Democratic Labour Party (RSDLP), and Soviet politician.

== Early career ==
Yakov Davidovich Drabkin was born on January 1, 1874, in Sapozhok, Ryazan Governorate, in the Russian Empire into a Jewish family. He became involved in the revolutionary movement as a schoolboy in Rostov-on-Don, where his family moved in 1887. In 1896, as a student at the St Petersburg Institute of Technology, using the alias S.I.Gusev, he joined the League of Struggle for the Emancipation of the Working Class, whose leading figure was Vladimir Lenin. In 1899, the police expelled him from St Petersburg, and ordered him to return to Rostov. Working full-time as a revolutionary organiser, he recreated the Rostov branch of the RSDLP, which had been destroyed after a wave of arrested in 1899, organised a political demonstration in February 1902, to mark the anniversary of the abolition of Serfdom in Russia, and pulled together scattered groups of student revolutionaries, who met in August 1902 to form the 'South Russian Student Group'.

In July, Gusev was a delegate to the Second Congress of the RSDLP in Brussels, where he entertained fellow delegates by singing arias from operas in a "magnificent baritone". The Belgian ordered him out of the country, but he rejoined the Congress after it shifted to London. When the party split into its Bolshevik and Menshevik factions, he joined the Bolsheviks, and he continued to support Lenin when other Bolsheviks wanted to reconcile the two factions. In July 1904, he took part in the first unofficial conference of Bolsheviks in Geneva, and was elected to the Bureau of Majoirity Committees, forerunner to the Central Committee of the Communist Party of the Soviet Union.

In 1904–05, Gusev was secretary of the St Petersburg Bolshevik committee, and was therefore the leading Bolshevik in the capital in the early months of the 1905 Revolution, when he organised elections to the Shidlovsky Commission, which investigated the grievances of industrial workers, overcoming the opposition from 'leftist' members of the Bolshevik committee who advocated boycotting it.

Later in 1905, Gusev was posted to Odessa, as secretary of the Bolshevik committee. He was there during the famous mutiny on the Battleship Potemkin, but was not involved, and, according to the historian J.H.L. Keep, "seems to have spent time in idle talk." At a meeting of the Odessa Bolshevik committee, in September 1905, calling on the party to try to take control of the emerging trade unions, whilst trying also "to expose in our propaganda and agitation all the illusions about trade unions ... (and) to clarify to the proletariat that a broad and stable development of the trade union movement is unthinkable under an autocratic regime."

In 1906, he represented the Moscow Bolsheviks at the RSDLP Congress in Stockholm. Returning to Moscow, he was arrested and deported to Siberia for three years. Returning to St Petersburg in 1909, he fled to Terijoki when he feared that he was about to be arrested, and had a nervous breakdown, after which he withdrew from party activity for eight years.

== Soviet official ==
Gusev rejoined the Bolsheviks in 1917, after the February Revolution, and was one of the founders of the Red Army. Early in 1919, he was a member of the Military Revolutionary Committee directing operations on the Eastern Front during the Russian Civil War. In July 1919, after the Red Army had had a spectacular success in driving the White army across the Urals into Siberia, Gusev was appointed to the six-member Military Revolutionary Committee, chaired by Leon Trotsky, who mistrusted Gusev, and later described him as a "genuine agent" of Josif Stalin, Trotsky's rival.

Gusev was, with Mikhail Frunze, the leading theorist of the so-called 'Military Opposition', of which Stalin's crony Kliment Voroshilov was a supporter, who claimed that there was a specifically proletarian way of training an army and waging war, which Trotsky disputed. In 1921, despite Trotsky's opposition, Gusev was appointed head of the political administration (PUR) of the Red Army, but was removed in 1922 and replaced by one of Trotsky's supporters, Vladimir Antonov-Ovseyenko.

Gusev was a candidate member of the Central Committee in 1920–24. In 1923, he was appointed Secretary of the Central Control Commission (CCC) In January 1924, after the sacking of Antonov-Ovseyenko, Gusev was appointed head of a special commission incvestigating the Red Army. He backed Stalin in the disputes that split the communist party after the death of Lenin. In December 1924, he published an article in Pravda that was one of the first attacks on Trotsky's record as the head of the Red Army during the civil war. In 1925, he was appointed head of the press bureau of the Central Committee.

Addressing the 14th Congress of the CPSU in December 1925, he said that every party member had a duty to report anyone to the CCC anyone who was involved in organised opposition to Stalin's leadership.

== USA visit ==
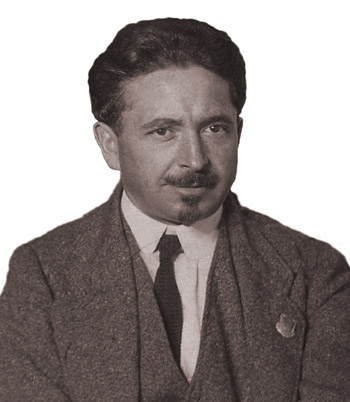
Max Bedacht, co-founder of the CPUSA, answered questions about Gusev during a 1939 Dies Committee hearing

In June 1925 he was sent to the United States as a representative of the Comintern to the Workers Party of America. He stayed in the US, using the pseudonym, P. Green, until the end of the year. His main task was to mediate a dispute between rival factions led, respectively, by William Z. Foster and Charles Ruthenberg. Foster's group dominated the Fourth Congress of Workers Party, in Chicago in August 1925, and proposed to remove Ruthenberg from his post as party secretary, until Gusev hit them with an instruction from Moscow declaring that the Ruthenberg was 'more loyal' to the Comintern line.

On October 16, 1939, J. B. Matthews, chief investigator for the Dies Committee of the U.S. House of Representatives, inquired into activities of Gusev (transliterated as "Gussev" in the transcript) in the U.S. during the 1920s with Max Bedacht, a co-founder of the Communist Party of the USA and long-time general secretary of the International Workers Order (IWO):

Mr. Matthews: Do you know a man by the name Gussev?
Mr. Bedacht: Gussev–I met Gussev in the Communist International.
Mr. Matthews: Did you ever meet him in the United States?
Mr. Bedacht: I did not.
Mr. Matthews. You never met Gussev in the United States?
Mr. Bedacht: No.
Mr. Matthews: Did Gussev ever write for The Communist during your editorship?
Mr. Bedacht. That may be so. I know I solicited articles when I was in Moscow; I tried to solicit articles for The Communist from people I met.
Mr. Matthews: Did you know Gussev as a Comintern representative in the United States?
Mr. Bedacht: I don't know him as such.
Mr. Matthews: Did you ever know him by the name of "Green" or some other alias?

Mr. Bedacht: No.

== Comintern ==
Gusev's involvement in Comintern affairs began in March 1925, when, as representative of the CCC, he led the condemnation of Trotsky's ally Karl Radek, and Radek's German allies, Heinrich Brandler and August Thalheimer, who were banned from participation in the affairs of Comintern. In 1928, he was appointed head of the Central European secretariat of Comintern. Late that year, he put pressure on communist trade union leaders in Germany to break from the old labour federation, Allgemeiner Deutscher Gewerkschaftsbund, which was dominated by social democrats, and form a separate federation.

== Personality ==
Trotsky wrote: "Among the party workers ...was a man named Gusev. He called himself an 'Old Bolshevik'...His special vocation is that of falsifying the history of the civil war, for which his main qualification is his apathetic cynicism." The French communist, Victor Serge, watched Gusev addressing a party meeting as the communist party was splitting in the late 1920s:

Large, slightly bald and well-built, he got at his audience through the degrading hypnotism which is associated with systematic violence. In order to argue in this particularly foul manner one must, first, be sure of having force at one's elbow, and, secondly, make up one's mind to stop at nothing. It is, at bottom, a fear-making technique. Not a single word of his won conviction...

Nadezhda Mandelstam, who met Gusev in 1930, said that she and her husband Osip Mandelstam joked afterwards about his 'Stony face' – "Only Soviet officials could make their faces turn to stone like this."

== Personal life and death ==
Gusev's wife Feodosia, was a party member from 1902, who played an active part in the 1905 revolution, and worked for the Foreign Literature publishing house after the revolution.

Their daughter, Elizaveta Drabkina (1901–1974), was born in Brussels, where she lived to the age of five. At the age of 16, she was secretary to Yakov Sverdlov, one of the most powerful men in Soviet Russia. In 1926, in contrast to her father, she joined the Trotskyist opposition, and was expelled from the CPSU in 1928. She recanted in 1929, and was readmitted to the party, but was expelled again in August 1936, arrested in December, and sentenced to five years in the Gulag. After her release, she worked as an economist, but was rearrested in 1949. Rehabilitated in the mid-1950s, she published several novels based on her life.

Gusev died on June 10, 1933, in Moscow, and his ashes were buried at the Kremlin Wall Necropolis.
