= Vasily Shorin =

Soviet military commander (1870–1938)

Vasily Ivanovich Shorin
- Born: 26 December 1870 (7 January 1871 N.S.); Kalyazin, Russian Empire
- Died: 29 June 1938 (aged 67) Leningrad, Soviet Union
- Allegiance: Russian Empire; Soviet Union
- Branch: Imperial Russian Army; Soviet Red Army
- Commands: 26th Infantry Division (Russian Empire); Southeastern Front (RSFSR)
- Conflicts: Russo-Japanese War; World War I Russian Civil War

Vasily Ivanovich Shorin (Russian: Васи́лий Ива́нович Шо́рин; 26 December 1870 [7 January 1871], Kalyazin – 29 June 1938, Leningrad) was a Soviet military commander, who commanded several military units of the Red Army during the Russian Civil War.

== Biography ==
He graduated from the Kazan infantry school of the Junkers in 1892. In the Russo-Japanese War of 1904-1905 he commanded a company, and a battalion at the start of World War I. By June 1916, he was Colonel of the 333rd Infantry Glazovsky Regiment.

After the October Revolution, he took the side of the Soviet government. He was elected by the soldiers as commander of the 26th Infantry Division. In September 1918, he was appointed commander of the Second Army of the Eastern Front. Shorin successfully reorganized the army and directed her actions in the Izhevsk-Votkinsk operation in 1918 during the spring offensive of Admiral Kolchak's troops. Since May 1919 he was the commander of the Northern Group of the Eastern Front, and led the Perm and the Ekaterinburg operations.

From the end of July 1919, he commanded a special group of the Southern Front (9th, 10th, and later 11th Army), reorganized in September 1919 into the Southeastern Front.

He participated in the Southern Front counteroffensive, but was beaten by Denikin's White forces.

The troops of the front successfully operated during the counteroffensive against the Army of General Denikin at the end of 1919. In January 1920, he commanded the Caucasian Front.

In 1920 he was a member of the Siberian Revolutionary Committee. From May 1920 to January 1921 he was an assistant to the Commander-in-Chief of the Armed Forces of the Far Eastern Republic, led the suppression of anti-Soviet uprisings (Grigory Rogov in Prichumyshye 1920, the People's Insurgent Army in the Altay Steppe 1920, the Western Siberia Uprising of 1921) and the struggle with the troops of Baron Ungern von Sternberg. From January 1922, he commanded the troops of the Turkestan Front and participated in the struggle against the Basmachi, in particular in November 1922, when Enver Pasha was liquidated.

In 1923–1925, he was deputy commander of the troops of the Leningrad Military District. In 1925, he was retired and put in the reserve. He supervised the formation of OSOAVIAKHIM in Leningrad.

He was arrested in 1938. According to some reports he was shot, but according to other sources he died in prison before trial. He is buried on the Bogoslovskoe Cemetery in St. Petersburg.

Military offices
| Preceded by | Commander of the 26th Infantry Division; 1917-1918 | Succeeded by |
