= Outline of the White Movement (Russia) =

Overview of and topical guide to the White Movement in Russia

White movement
- Бѣлое движеніе Белое движение
- Flag of Russia
- Leaders: Alexander Kolchak (executed); Anton Denikin; Pyotr Wrangel; Lavr Kornilov †
- Dates active: 1917–1923
- Country: Russian Empire; Russian State (1918–1920)
- Ideology: Anti-communism; Russian nationalism Proto-fascism; Monarchism
- Wars: Russian Civil War

The following outline is provided as an overview of and topical guide to the White Movement in Russia.

The White movement, also known as the Whites, was one of the main factions of the Russian Civil War of 1917–1922. Led mainly by conservative and right-wing officers of the Russian Empire, it stood in armed opposition to the Bolsheviks, who had led the October Revolution and were known as the Reds. The movement operated as a system of governments and administrations united as the Russian State, which functioned as a military dictatorship for most of its existence. Its military formations were collectively referred to as the White Army or the White Guard. The movement also carried out a campaign of White Terror against its opponents.

== Overviews ==
- White movement - Anti-Bolshevik faction of the Russian Civil War, led mainly by conservative and right-wing officers of the former imperial army.
- White Army - armed formations of the White movement
- Russian Revolution - Period of political and social change beginning in 1917 that abolished the monarchy and brought a socialist government to power.
- Russian Civil War - Multi-party war in the former Russian Empire, 1917–1922, won by the Bolsheviks and followed by the founding of the Soviet Union.
- Russian State (1918–1920) - Anti-Bolshevik Russian state led by Alexander Kolchak.
- Russian Republic -State proclaimed by the Russian Provisional Government in September 1917 and dissolved during the October Revolution.
- White Terror (Russia) - Violence and mass killings carried out by the White movement during the civil war.
- White émigré - Russians who left the former Russian Empire after the revolution and civil war.

== Background ==
- Russian Empire - (1721–1917), ended by the February Revolution.
- Imperial Russian Army - Army of the Russian Empire (1721–1917).
- Imperial Russian Navy - Navy of the Russian Tsardom and Empire (1696–1917)
- Cossacks - Predominantly East Slavic military communities of the steppe of southern Russia and eastern Ukraine.
- Black Hundreds - Reactionary, ultra-nationalist groups.
- February Revolution - First of the two revolutions of 1917
- Russian Provisional Government - Government established after the abdication of Nicholas II on 15 March 1917, led by Georgy Lvov and Alexander Kerensky.
- Kornilov affair - Attempted military coup against the Provisional Government by commander-in-chief Lavr Kornilov.
- Bykhov Imprisonment - Detention of Kornilov, Anton Denikin, and other generals at Bykhov for their part in the Kornilov affair.
- October Revolution - Second revolution of 1917. Vladimir Lenin and the Bolsheviks seized power.
- Russian Constituent Assembly - Assembly convened after the October Revolution; it met only once on 18–19 January 1918.
- Decree on Peace - Decree written by Lenin in November 1917, declaring all belligerents should negotiate a peace without annexations or indemnities.
- Decree on Land - Decree written by Lenin in November 1917, redistributing land to the peasantry.
- Treaty of Brest-Litovsk - Separate peace signed on 3 March 1918 between the Bolsheviks and the Central Powers.

== Related conflicts ==
- Russian Civil War (1917–1923)
- Allied intervention in the Russian Civil War (1917–1925)
- North Russia intervention (1918–1919)
- Siberian intervention (1918–1922)
- Polish–Soviet War (1919–1921)
- Estonian War of Independence (1918–1920)
- Latvian War of Independence (1918–1920)
- Ukrainian War of Independence (1917–1921)
- Ukrainian–Soviet War (1917–1921)
- Finnish Civil War (1918–1918)

== Events ==
=== Ukraine ===
- Anti-Hetman Uprising - (16 November – 15 December 1918) - Volunteer Army
- Katerynoslav March - (27 November 1918 – 2 January 1919) - Armed Forces of the Ukrainian State
- Battle for the Donbas (1919) - (12 January – 31 May 1919) - Volunteer Army, Don Cossacks, and the Armed Forces of South Russia
- Kharkiv Operation (June 1919) - (June 1919)
- Odessa Operation (1919) - (20–24 August 1919) - Armed Forces of South Russia
- Capture of Kiev by the White Army - (30–31 August 1919)
- Battle of Peregonovka - (22–25 September 1919) - Armed Forces of South Russia: Volunteer Army
- Kharkiv Operation (December 1919) - (24 November – 12 December 1919) - Armed Forces of South Russia
- Battle of Kiev (December 1919) - (10–16 December 1919) - White forces under Abram Dragomirov
- Donbas operation (1919) - (18 December 1919 – 6 January 1920) - Armed Forces of South Russia
- Odessa Operation (1920) - (11 January – 8 February 1920) - Armed Forces of South Russia
- Northern Taurida Operation - (6 June – 3 November 1920)
- Ulagay's Landing - (14 August – 7 September 1920)
- Siege of Perekop (1920) - (7–17 November 1920)
- Evacuation of the Crimea - (November 1920)

=== Central Russia and North Caucasus ===
- Sochi conflict - (June 1918 – May 1919) - White movement: Volunteer Army until 8 January 1919; Armed Forces of South Russia from 8 January 1919
- Second Kuban Campaign - (9 June [O.S.] / 22 June [N.S.] – November 1918)
- Northern Caucasus Operation (1918–1919) - (December 1918 – March 1919)
- Battle of Gagra (1919) - (16–19 April 1919)
- Advance on Moscow (1919) - (3 July – 18 November 1919) - Armed Forces of South Russia
- Orel–Kursk operation - (11 October – 18 November 1919) - Volunteer Army
- Voronezh–Kastornoye operation (1919) - (13 October – 16 November 1919) - Volunteer Army
- North Caucasus Operation (1920) - (17 January – 7 April 1920) - Armed Forces of South Russia
- Evacuation of Novorossiysk - (March 1920) - Armed Forces of South Russia

=== Volga and Urals ===
- Donbas-Don operation - (8 January – 25 February 1918) - Volunteer Army and Don Cossack forces
- Ice March - (22 February – 13 May 1918) - Volunteer Army
- Iași–Don March - (26 February [O.S.] / 11 March [N.S.] – 24 April [O.S.] / 7 May [N.S.] 1918)
- Battle of Tsaritsyn - (July 1918 – January 1920)
- Capture of Kazan by the White Army - (1–7 August 1918) - People's Army of Komuch and Czechoslovak Legion
- Perm Operation (1918–19) - (29 November 1918 – 28 January 1919) - Siberian Army
- Spring offensive of the White Army - (4 March – 29 April 1919)
- Vyoshenskaya Uprising - (11 March – 8 June 1919)
- Manych Operation (1919) - (April – May 1919)
- Eastern Front counteroffensive - (28 April – July 1919)
- Southern Front counteroffensive - (14 August – 12 September 1919)
- Khopyor–Don Operation - (20 November – 8 December 1919) - Don Army
- Rostov–Novocherkassk Operation - (6–10 January 1920)

=== Siberia and Russian Far East ===
- Great Siberian Ice March - (14 November 1919 – March 1920)
- Chita Operations - (10 April – 31 October 1920)
- Yakut revolt - (2 September 1921 – 16 June 1923)
- Battle of Volochayevka - (5–14 February 1922) - Far Eastern Army

=== Other ===
- Mughan clashes - (March 1918 – August 1919)
- Crimea Operation (1918) - (13–25 April 1918)
- Revolt of the Czechoslovak Legion - (14 May – October 1918) - Czechoslovak Legion
- Izhevsk–Votkinsk Uprising - (8 August – 12 November 1918)
- 1919 Soviet invasion of Ukraine - (1919)
- Khotyn Uprising - (7 January – 1 February 1919)
- Battle of Shenkursk - (19–25 January 1919)
- Muslim uprisings in Kars and Sharur–Nakhichevan - (1 July 1919 – 28 July 1920) - Armed Forces of South Russia
- Battle of Petrograd - (28 September – 14 November 1919) - Northwestern Army (Russia)
- First Winter Campaign - (6 December 1919 – 6 May 1920) - Ukrainian People's Army
- Soviet intervention in Mongolia - (1 May – 31 August 1921)

== People ==
- Leaders of the Russian Civil War

=== Political leaders ===
- Alexander Kolchak
- Anton Denikin
- Pyotr Wrangel
- Alexey Kaledin
- Pyotr Krasnov
- Grigory Semyonov
- Alexander Krivoshein
- Nikolai Tchaikovsky
- Boris Savinkov
- Peter Struve
- Pavel Milyukov
- Vasily Maklakov
- Vasily Shulgin
- Vladimir Purishkevich
- Sergey Sazonov
- Alexander Guchkov
- Mikhail Rodzianko
- Georgy Lvov
- Vladimir Dmitrievich Nabokov

=== Military leaders ===
- Mikhail Alekseyev
- Lavr Kornilov
- Mikhail Drozdovsky
- Alexander Lukomsky
- Abram Dragomirov
- Ivan Romanovsky
- Alexander Kutepov
- Vladimir May-Mayevsky
- Yakov Slashchov
- Sergei Ulagay
- Andrei Shkuro
- Konstantin Mamontov
- Anton Turkul
- Vladimir Vitkovsky
- Nikolai Skoblin
- Boris Shteifon
- Nikolai Yudenich
- Alexander Rodzyanko
- Pavel Bermondt-Avalov
- Stanisław Bułak-Bałachowicz
- Yevgeny Miller
- Vladimir Marushevsky
- Vladimir Kappel
- Anatoly Pepelyayev
- Mikhail Diterikhs
- Alexander Dutov
- Boris Annenkov
- Ivan Kalmykov
- Konstantin Petrovich Nechaev
- Roman von Ungern-Sternberg
- Nikolai Golovin
- Alexander Kazakov

=== Other figures ===
- Nicholas II
- Grand Duke Kirill Vladimirovich of Russia
- Aleksei Brusilov
- Eulogius Georgiyevsky
- Ivan Ilyin
- Nikolai Ustryalov
- Ivan Bunin
- Marina Tsvetaeva
- Roman Gul
- Sidney Reilly
- Paul Dukes

== Organizations ==
=== Political parties ===
- Constitutional Democratic Party

=== Governments and administrations ===
- Russian State (1918–1920)
- Provisional All-Russian Government
- Russian Government (1918–1919)
- Committee of Members of the Constituent Assembly
- State Meeting in Ufa
- Provisional Siberian Government (Omsk)
- Provisional Siberian Government (Vladivostok)
- Provisional Regional Government of the Urals
- Provisional Government of the Northern Region
- Regional Government of Northwest Russia
- Government of South Russia
- Don Republic
- Kuban People's Republic
- Kuban Rada
- Crimean Regional Government
- Provisional Priamurye Government
- Eastern Okraina

=== Military formations ===
- 1st Army Corps (Armed Forces of South Russia)
- 1st Middle Siberian Corps
- 1st Officer General Markov Regiment
- 1st Siberian Assault Brigade
- 2nd Army Corps (Armed Forces of South Russia)
- 2nd Steppe Siberian Corps
- 3rd Army Corps (Armed Forces of South Russia)
- 3rd Ural Corps
- 4th Eastern Siberian Corps
- 5th Pri-Amur Corps
- Arctic Ocean Flotilla
- Armed Forces of South Russia
- Army of Wrangel
- Asiatic Cavalry Division
- Azov Flotilla
- Baltische Landeswehr
- Caspian Flotilla of the White Movement
- Caucasian Native Cavalry Division
- Caucasus Army (Armed Forces of South Russia)
- Caucasus Grenadier Division (Russian Empire)
- Chernetsov's Partisans
- Colored military units
- Crimean–Azov Army (Armed Forces of South Russia)
- Czechoslovak Legion
- Don Army
- Far Eastern Army
- Kornilov Shock Regiment
- Markovtsy
- Northern Army (Russia)
- Northwestern Army (Russia)
- Orenburg Independent Army
- Peasant Army of Fergana
- People's Army of Komuch
- Polish Armed Forces in the East (1914–1920)
- Russian Army (1919)
- Siberian Army
- Southern Army (1918)
- Turkestan Army (Armed Forces of South Russia)
- Ural Army
- Volunteer Army
- West Russian Volunteer Army
- Western Separate Army
- White Army
- White Rebel Army
- Zemskaya Rat

=== Cossacks ===
- Don Cossacks
- Terek Cossacks
- Ural Cossacks
- Orenburg Cossacks
- Siberian Cossacks

=== Foreign missions and expeditions ===
- American Expeditionary Force, North Russia
- American Expeditionary Force, Siberia
- British campaign in the Baltic (1918–1919)
- Malleson mission

=== Other ===
- Black Hundreds - Early 20th-century Russian monarchist movement.
- Zemgor - Russian organization aiding the government during World War I.
- Russian All-Military Union - White movement organization.
- Brotherhood of Russian Truth - Russian émigré organization.
- Russian Orthodox Church Outside of Russia - Semi-autonomous part of the Russian Orthodox Church.

== Places ==
- Omsk
- Yekaterinodar
- Rostov-on-Don
- Novorossiysk
- Sevastopol
- Crimea
- North Caucasus
- Siberia
- Arkhangelsk
- Vladivostok
- Lemnos
- Bizerte

== Culture and society ==
- White émigré - Russian anti-communist émigrés.
- Harbin Russians - Russian community in Harbin, China.
- Russian Orthodox Church Outside of Russia - Semi-autonomous part of the Russian Orthodox Church.
- And Quiet Flows the Don - Novel by Mikhail Sholokhov.
- The White Guard - 1925 novel by Mikhail Bulgakov.
- The Days of the Turbins - Play by Mikhail Bulgakov.
- Flight (play) - Play by Mikhail Bulgakov.
- Doctor Zhivago - 1957 novel by Boris Pasternak.
- The Elusive Avengers - 1967 Soviet action-adventure film.
- Two Comrades Were Serving - 1968 Soviet Union war film.
- Admiral - 2008 Russian biographical film.
- Sunstroke - 2014 Russian historical romance film.

== Miscellaneous ==
- Flag of Russia
- Anti-communism
- Sisson Documents
- Tsarist officers in the Red Army
- Murder of the Romanov family
- Russian famine of 1921–1922
- De-Cossackization - (1919–1933) - Bolshevik campaign directed against Cossack populations.
- Red Terror - (1918–1922) - Bolshevik campaign conducted through the Cheka.

== Bibliography ==
- Smith, S. A. (2017). Russia in Revolution: An Empire in Crisis, 1890 to 1928. New York: Oxford University Press.
- Engelstein, L. (2017). Russia in Flames: War, Revolution, Civil War, 1914–1921. New York: Oxford University Press.
- Figes, O. (1996). A People's Tragedy: A History of the Russian Revolution. New York: Viking.
- McMeekin, S. (2017). The Russian Revolution: A New History. New York: Basic Books.
- Smele, J. (2016). The "Russian" Civil Wars, 1916–1926: Ten Years That Shook the World. New York: Oxford University Press. (Note: Contains a 46-page bibliography of English and non-English works on the "Russian" Civil Wars.)

Additional sources

- Browder, R. P., & Kerensky, A. F. (Eds.). (1961). The Russian Provisional Government, 1917: Documents (Vols. 1–3). Stanford University Press.
- Editors of Encyclopædia Britannica. (2026a, August 5). Russian Provisional Government. In Encyclopædia Britannica.
- Radkey, O. H. (1990). Russia goes to the polls: The election to the All-Russian Constituent Assembly, 1917. Cornell University Press.
- Rosenberg, W. G. (1974). Liberals in the Russian Revolution: The Constitutional Democratic Party, 1917–1921. Princeton University Press.
- Sablin, I. (2021). The democratic conference and the pre-parliament in Russia, 1917: Class, nationality, and the building of a postimperial community. Nationalities Papers, 51(2), 446–468. doi:10.1017/nps.2021.73
- Wade, R. A. (2017). The Russian Revolution, 1917 (3rd ed.). Cambridge University Press. doi:10.1017/9781316417898

== See also ==
- Category:White movement
- Russian Democratic Federative Republic
- Index of articles related to the Russian Revolution and Civil War
