= 1st Siberian Assault Brigade =

White Army assault brigade of the Russian Civil War

- 1-я Сибирская штурмовая бригада
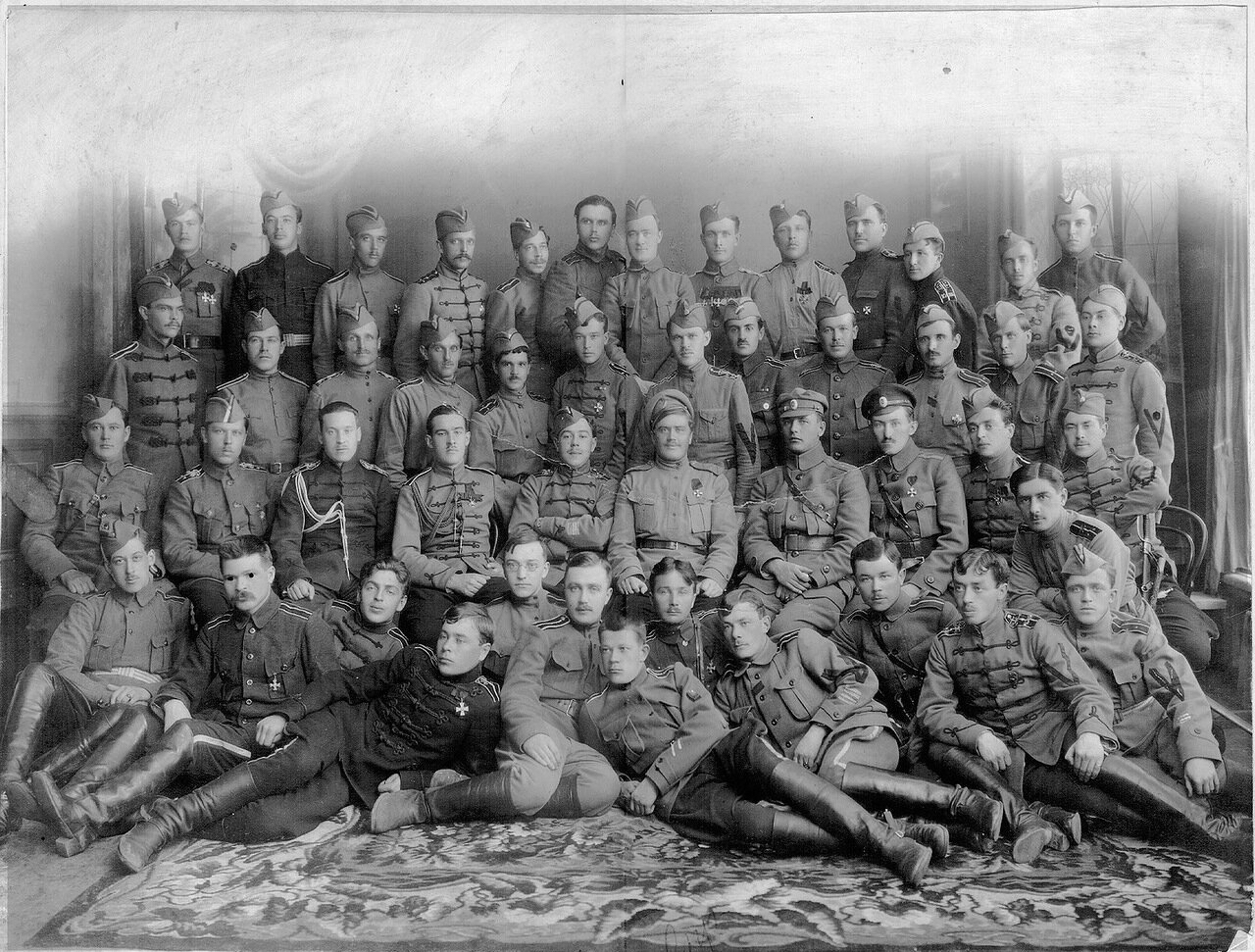
- Officers of the brigade in Perm
- Active: 1918–1920
- Country: Russian State
- Allegiance: 1st Middle Siberian Corps
- Type: Storm/assault brigade
- Size: c. 5,000 (peak)
- Engagements: Russian Civil War: Eastern Front; Perm Operation

Commanders
- Notable commanders: Anatoly Pepelyayev; Colonel Urbanovsky; Colonel Sokolov

The 1st Siberian Assault Brigade was an elite assault unit of the White Army subordinated to the 1st Middle Siberian Corps of Anatoly Pepelyayev. Initially it was formed as a battalion of the corps' 2nd Rifle Division but was expanded to a brigade of 3,000 men. Its fame was as of the Kornilov Shock Regiment and known throughout Siberia for their bravery and courage.

== Combat operations ==
=== Formation ===
By order of the commander of the 1st Middle Siberian Corps, General A. N. Pepelyayev, on September 24, 1918, the formation of a separate Assault Battalion began within the corps. The battalion consisted of four companies and was commanded by Captain E. I. Urbankovsky. The battalion was formed in Achinsk. A small volunteer officers' detachment served as the foundation, and additional officers were assigned from the 7th Kuznetsk Regiment: Captain Urbanovsky; Staff Captain Nikolai Zaskokin; Staff Captain Vladimir Nikolsky; Staff Captain Alexei Ivanov; Lieutenant Alexei Strunge; Lieutenant Yuliy Kuney; and the commander of the Tomsk Hussar Squadron, Staff Captain Plotnikov.

The battalion also incorporated two previously formed separate assault companies, the first was organized in Tomsk (32 officers and 210 volunteers), and the second in Novonikolaevsk (a total of 32 officers and volunteers). (Note: According to other sources, the battalion was formed from companies of the Novonikolaevsk, Barabinsk, Yenisei, and Barnaul regiments; the scouts and machine gunners in them were mobilized from Perm Governorate.).

=== Combat ===
In late October 1918, 140 assault troopers with three machine guns suppressed an uprising in the village of Chumay in the Mariinsky District. In November, the battalion began participating in battles on the Eastern Front, capturing the Kynovsky plant on December 1. On the 11th, the battalion succeeded in capturing the Nytvinsky Plant, defeating the 1st Kronstadt Naval Regiment, two battalions surrendered, and the 3rd, which offered resistance, was completely destroyed. About 100 sailors who surrendered were bayoneted after the battle. The destroyed Kronstadt Naval Regiment numbered more than 2 thousand people.

Continuing the offensive, the battalion participated in the battles to capture Perm (including capturing Perm station with a large number of trains carrying equipment and a bridge across the Kama River prepared for destruction), and for its military distinctions received the personal patronage of General A. N. Pepeliaev. Two weeks later, the battalion covered the division's retreat after the Red Army counteroffensive with the aim of recapturing Perm. On January 14, in an ambush near the village of Sergino, stormtroopers defeated the Lesnovsky-Vyborg Regiment and the 256th Regiment, which lost 560 men out of 940. The White Guard strike force, consisting of stormtroopers, the 8th Biysk and 11th Orenburg Cossack Regiments, under the overall command of Urbanovsky, continued the offensive in the direction of Okhansk and Kungur.

After ruthless and continuous fighting in January 1919, the battalion was reduced to only 97 men. But on February 9, it was expanded to 3,000 men as follows:

- 1st, 2nd, 3rd Siberian Assault battalions,
- 1st Siberian Assault Cavalry Divizion,
- 1st Siberian Assault Artillery Divizion,
- 1st Siberian Engineering Divizion.

In addition to the standard oath to the Russian army, volunteer stormtroopers signed a solemn commitment: to observe military laws, to support the authority of their superiors, not to belong to political parties, not to spare life in combat and, if necessary, to sacrifice it for Russia.

The brigade took part in the counteroffensive of the Siberian Army in March 1919, and the assault group advanced south, securing villages like Vorob'i, Pleshki, Zapolye, and Komary by 11 January after defeating elements of the 1st Ural and Bogoyavlensky Regiments. On March 11, in the oncoming battles near Dvoretskaya station, the brigade commander, Captain Urbanovsky, was killed and posthumously received the rank of lieutenant colonel.

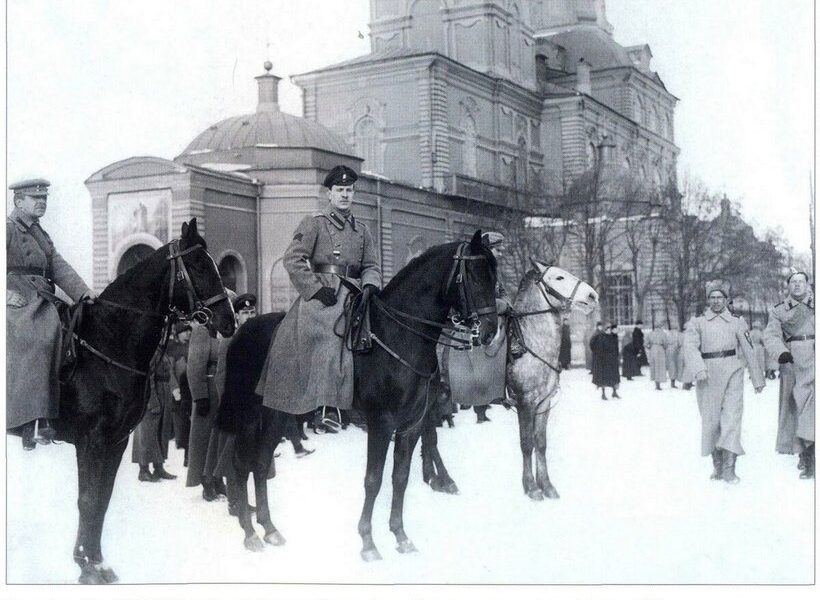
Radola Gajda at the parade of the shocktroopers on March 9th 1919.

As of April 28, 1919, the brigade had been reinforced with volunteers, Postonogov's partisan detachment, and mobilized personnel, and was supposed to consist of:

- Brigade headquarters and command staff
- 1st Separate Assault Battalion named after Colonel Urbankovsky
- 2nd, 3rd, and 4th Separate Assault Battalions
- 1st Siberian Assault Cavalry Divizion consisting of 2 squadrons
- 1st Siberian Assault Engineer Divizion (a sapper company and a telephone section)
- 1st Siberian Assault Artillery Divizion (2 batteries with 4 3-inch guns each and one battery with 2 3-inch mountain guns)
- Commandant's Company, Automobile Unit, Mobile Field Hospital.

The brigade continued fighting as part of the corps, fighting in the Vyatka direction. During the Red Army's Sarapul-Votkinsk offensive, the stormtroopers launched counterattacks and, having advanced 40 km, threatened to capture the city of Glazov. Subsequently, the brigade fought rearguard actions, covering the corps' retreat to Siberia (the stormtroopers fought for Perm for almost a week, losing about 600 men), and participated in the Tobolsk operation. (Note: S. V. Volkov suggests that “in the summer of 1919 the brigade was renamed the Jaeger Brigade, and, moreover, it also spun off the Grenadier Regiment (the so-called ‘green grenadiers,’ who apparently served as General Pepelyaev’s personal convoy and guard).”.) On December 16, 1919, the Green Grenadiers of the brigade defected to the Red Army after an uprising by the Bolshevik underground in Tomsk. The defectors formed the 1st Soviet Shock Regiment.

The second report took us completely by surprise. A large group of officers entered the room where the Military Revolutionary Committee was meeting. Despite the bitter cold, they were all wearing caps. On the sleeves of their greatcoats were the edged insignia of the suicide bombers: a skull with two crossed shins. Their hands involuntarily reached for their revolvers: after all, these were our most ardent enemies.

A few steps before we reached the table at which we were sitting, a young captain commanded, "Attention, gentlemen officers!" The officers froze dramatically. Addressing us, the captain reports: "The Grenadier Battalion intercepted a Jaeger Regiment as it was leaving the city and fired on it. The enemy retreated without accepting combat. What are your orders for further action? " After a quick consultation with us, Janson replies: "Remain in your current position until you receive further instructions from our headquarters." But the captain doesn't leave. Looking back at the officers, frozen and motionless as statues, he continues: "Please note that the Grenadiers were the first to engage in combat operations against Pepelyaev's men. We request that we be given the title of the first Soviet shock regiment." A barely perceptible smile touched Janson's golden mustache. "Very well, I will convey your request to the Red Army command. Only they have the right to decide this matter." Again the captain's dramatic command, and the group of officers, stamping their feet like guards, departs. As soon as the door closed behind them, we jumped up from our seats and burst into uncontrollable laughter:

Nothing to say, nimble fellows: from Kolchak's "death row" to Soviet shock troops!

— Ya.R. Yelkovich, Stories of Unforgettable Years. Barnaul, 1964. Pp. 119-120.

The brigade participated in the Great Siberian Ice March with retreating White Guard units in Siberia. It reached Krasnoyarsk. The last mention of the brigade occurs in early 1920: on January 6 (new style), Red units encountered the enemy enveloping Krasnoyarsk to the east and fought fierce counter-attacks for four hours near the village of Drokino, inflicting a heavy defeat on the Whites. According to prisoner testimony, the 1st Siberian Assault Brigade also took part in the battle.

== Brigade uniform ==
Distinctive elements of the storm troopers’ uniform included the “zaletka” cap (the earlier name for foldable garrison caps), featuring a high front section, black piping along the edges of the turn-ups, and white piping along the seams of the upper folds, as well as white-and-green cockades or ribbons arranged in various ways. A red-and-black (“shock”) chevron was sewn onto the left sleeve of all servicemen. Despite the considerable variety in the shades of the trousers (black, dark green, and khaki), all of them displayed a single stripe made of silver galloon. Another characteristic uniform distinction of the brigade's ranks was the wearing of "zaletka" caps along with their greatcoats.

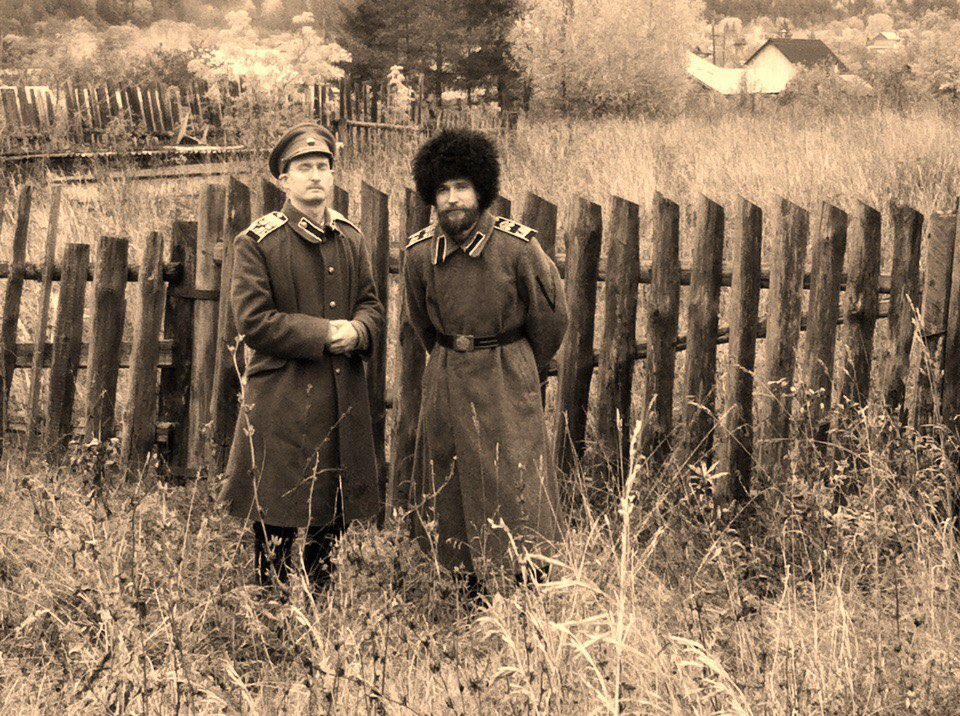
Stormtroopers of the brigade.

Among the distinctive features of the uniform worn by the 1st Siberian Assault Brigade and captured in the well-known group photograph of officers in Perm, particular attention is drawn to the officers’ uniquely styled hussar jackets (vengerkas), worn by many of them: protective-color garments with black “hussar-style” cords across the chest, hussar toggles instead of buttons, and matching cords on the cuffs. On the left sleeve, all wear a red-and-black (“shock troop”) chevron, and between its ends some appear to display a black skull (without crossed bones). These jackets were worn with the same black breeches or riding trousers used in other units, featuring a single sewn-on silver stripe, as well as side caps (“zaletka”). It is presumed that this uniform was assigned to the brigade's cavalry squadron.

Reconstruction of the brigade's uniform

== See also ==
- Siberian Army
- Anatoly Pepelyayev
- White movement
- 1st Middle Siberian Corps
- Kornilov Shock Regiment
