= Omsk Cadet Military Corps =

Coordinates: 54.9589°N 73.3473°E

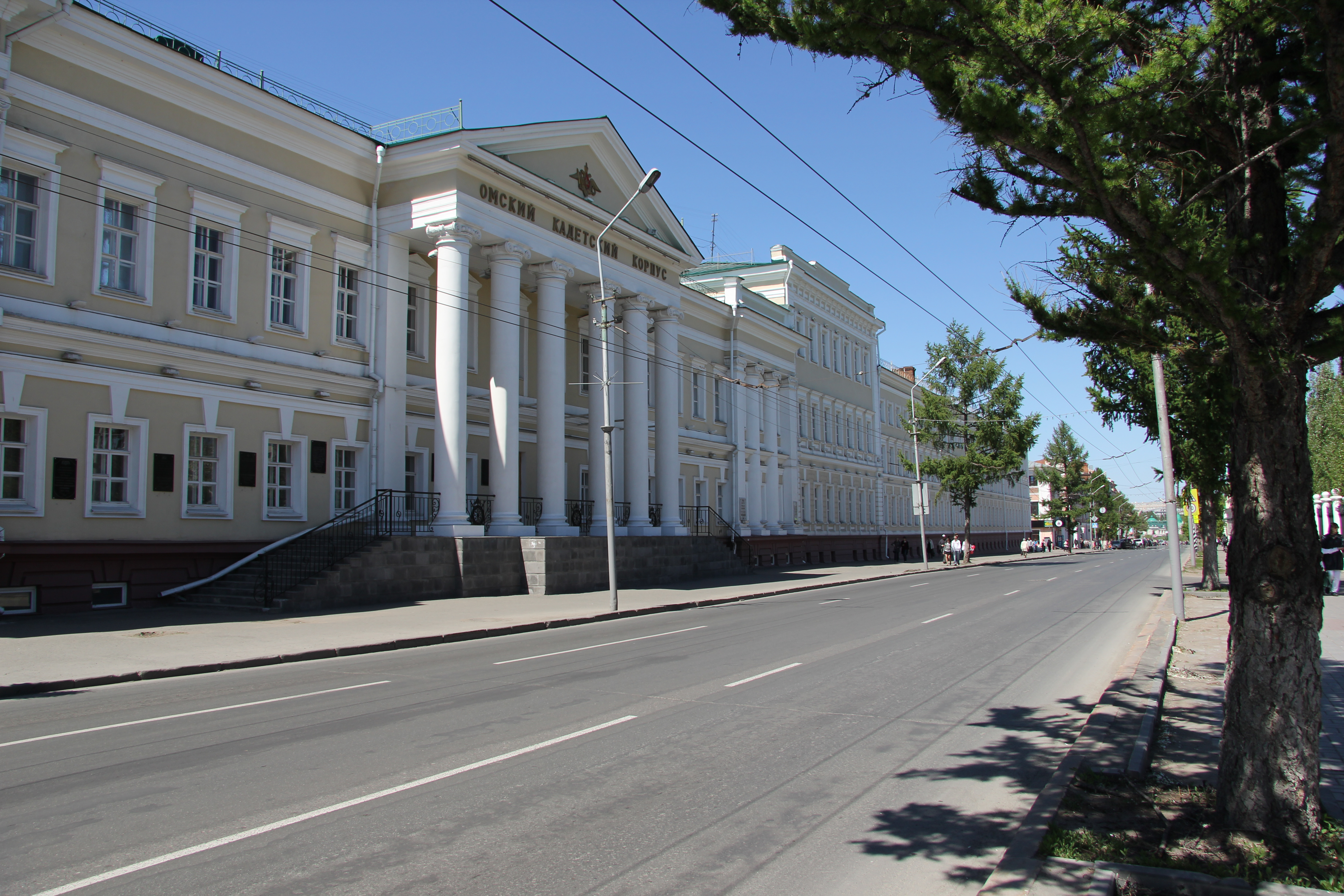
- The main building at Lenin street in Omsk
- Active: 1813-1925; 2013-
- Allegiance: Russia
- Branch: Ministry of Defense of Russia
- Type: Military school
- Website: okvk.mil.ru

Insignia
- Emblem

Omsk Cadet Military Corps (Russian: Омский кадетский корпус, romanized: Omsky kadetsky korpus) (until 1925 — 1st Siberian Emperor Alexander I Cadet Corps) is the oldest and leading military educational institution in Siberia, located in the city of Omsk. In 2009, it was recognized as the best cadet corps in Russia. Since 2014 — Federal State Budgetary Educational Institution "Omsk Cadet Military Corps of the Ministry of Defense of the Russian Federation". Coordinated by the Commander of the Airborne Troops of the Armed Forces of Russia. It is Heir and continuer of the glory of the 1st Siberian Emperor Alexander I Cadet Corps and successor of the Omsk Higher Combined Arms Command School named after M.V. Frunze.

== History ==
=== Russian Empire ===
The corps dates its foundation back to 1 May 1813 as the Omsk Military Cossack School, established on the initiative of the head of the Siberian border line and commander of the Separate Siberian Corps, Lieutenant General Grigory Ivanovich Glazenap. The founding of the cadet corps was mistakenly believed to be 26 August 1826, but the historical commission of the corps, with the assistance of the director of the corps, Lieutenant General Aleksandr Medvedev, established the actual date, and on 5 July 1912, by Imperial decree the corps was granted seniority from the date of the founding of the Omsk Military Cossack School, on 1 May 1813. On 1 May 1913, celebrating the 100th anniversary of the Omsk Cadet Corps, Emperor Nicholas II granted it the name of Emperor Alexander I and the corps was ordered to be henceforth called the 1st Siberian Emperor Alexander I Cadet Corps. All ranks and cadets of the corps were granted the monogram of Alexander I on their shoulder straps and epaulettes.

In 1913, 360 cadets studied at the institution, and another 52 in the preparatory boarding school of the Siberian Cossack Army. Unfortunately, little is known about the fate of the graduates of the institution in the pre-revolutionary era.

In 1908, Anatoly Pepelyayev graduated from the corps. He would later serve as a lieutenant general, and commander of the Siberian Army in the troops of Admiral Alexander Kolchak. In 1914 Aleksey Aleksandrovich Gryzov (Aleksey Achair), a fairly well-known poet of the White emigration, graduated from the corps. Almost all of the career officers died during World War I, including dozens of former Siberian cadets.

After the February Revolution, the Provisional Government ordered the transformation of the corps into the 1st Siberian Gymnasium of the Military Department. After the overthrow of Soviet power in Omsk, in the summer of 1918, the Provisional Siberian Government restored the cadet corps.

On the night of 18-19 February 1918, taking advantage of the confusion, a detachment of Ataman Boris Annenkov burst into Omsk, which occupied the corps building and the St. Nicholas Cossack Cathedral. After a shootout with the Red Guards, Annenkov's forces left the city.

In early 1919, Admiral Alexander Kolchak restored the name of the First Siberian Imperial. On 30 July 1919, the corps was evacuated to Vladivostok and quartered on Russky Island. Until 1 September 1919, the 1st Omsk Artillery School was located here. In January 1920, the left government of Aleksandr Medvedev came to power in Vladivostok, ordering the closure of the corps from 1 April 1921, but in May of that year the left government was overthrown, and the corps continued its activities. On 25 October 1922, the corps left Vladivostok for Shanghai on the ships of the Siberian Flotilla under the command of Admiral Georgi Stark. Here the First Siberian Imperial and Khabarovsk Cadet Corps were merged into one educational institution. Two graduations were made in Shanghai. In 1924, at the request of the Chinese authorities, the corps was forced to send first the junior classes in February, and on 6 November 1924, the senior classes to the Kingdom of Serbs, Croats and Slovenes, where both corps were officially disbanded on 1 February 1925.

=== Russian Federation ===
The Frunze Omsk Higher Combined Arms Command School was disbanded in 1999. On the initiative of the Governor of Omsk Oblast Leonid Polezhayev, and supported by the Minister of Defence Marshal Igor Sergeyev, the Omsk Cadet Corps of the Ministry of Defence of the Russian Federation was revived on the basis of the abolished school.

In December 2013, in accordance with the Order of the Government of Russia "On the transfer of the Omsk Region Cadet Boarding School "Omsk Cadet Corps" to the jurisdiction of the Ministry of Defence of the Russian Federation", the Cadet Corps was fully returned to the system of the Ministry of Defence. On 14 May 2014, Defence Minister Sergey Shoigu issued Order No. 309, which completed the procedure for transferring the Cadet Corps to the jurisdiction of the Ministry of Defence and established a new name for the institution, "Omsk Cadet Military Corps of the Ministry of Defence of the Russian Federation".

In June 2014, the Corps began the procedure for transitioning to a seven-year training period.

On 11 March 2016, a delegation from Pskov Oblast headed by the Governor of Pskov Oblast Andrey Turchak visited the Omsk Cadet Corps. On 14 May 2016, the Omsk Cadet Corps was presented with a banner and a Certificate of the Minister of Defence of the Russian Federation for the banner.
