= 1st Middle Siberian Corps =

- Country: Russia
- Allegiance: (Russian Empire) White movement
- Branch: Siberian Army
- Size: Corps
- Engagements: Russian Civil War

Commanders
- Commander: Anatoly Pepelyayev

The 1st Middle Siberian Corps (Russian: 1-й Средне-Сибирский армейский корпус) was one of the main formations of the Siberian Army during the Russian Civil War. It was created on June 12, 1918, under the command of Lieutenant Colonel Anatoly Pepelyayev.

== History ==
The force joined the Czechoslovak Legion of Captain Radola Gajda and, moving from the center of Siberia to Trans-Baikal in the East, cleared that territory from Bolsheviks. After that, they were replenished and deployed as the Middle-Siberian Corps (from August 26 1918) and 1st Middle Siberian Corps (from September 30 1918). The Corps was divided into 3 divisions.

Parts of the corps made the famous March to Perm, inflicting a crushing defeat on the Red 3rd Army in Winter 1918–1919. The Corps was then a part of the North Ural Front and the Yekaterinburg group of the Siberian Army. The corps took part in the Spring Offensive of the Russian Army (1919) and Counteroffensive of the Eastern Front in which it suffered heavy losses. In October only a quarter of the Corps remained, after which it was withdrawn to the rear for the transformation, but was decomposed and finally lost its fighting efficiency.

By January 6, 1920, only the 3rd Barnaul Siberian Rifle Regiment, which had safely retreated to the Transbaikal, remained from the whole Corps. Efforts by general A. N. Pepelyaev and major-General E. K. Vishnevskiy to revive the Corps in the East come to nothing.

== Commanders of the Corps ==
- Lieutenant Colonel (then Lieutenant-General) Anatoly Pepelyayev (June 13 1918 − May 1919),
- Major-General Bronislaw Zinevich (May 1919 − October 1919).

== Sources ==
- Наступление армий Колчака весной 1919 года
