= Spring offensive of the White Army =

1919 offensive of the Russian Civil War

Spring Offensive of the Russian Army
- Part of the Russian Civil War
- Map of the Spring Offensive of the Russian Army
Date	4 March – 29 April 1919
Location	Ural Region, Volga Region
Result	White victory

Belligerents
Red Army	White Army

Commanders and leaders
Gaya Gai (1st Army); Vasilii Shorin (2nd Army); Mikhail Lashevich (3d Army); Mikhail Frunze (4th Army); Jan Blumberg (5th Army); Grigory Zinoviev	Alexander Kolchak; Radola Gajda; Mikhail Hanzhin; Alexander Dutov

Strength
111,000 men 379 guns	113,000 men more than 200 guns

The Spring Offensive of the Russian Army was an offensive of the White Army of the White movement led by Alexander Kolchak on the Eastern Front of the Russian Civil War, between March and April 1919.

== Background ==
At the end of 1918, the situation on the Eastern Front of the Russian Civil War was unclear. Both sides fought for the Kama River. The Supreme Command of the Red Army prepared for major offensives on the Southern and Western fronts, hence there were no supplies available for the Eastern front. At the end of December, the Whites conquered Perm on the northern flank, but the Reds captured Ufa on the southern flank. On 22 January 1919 the Red 1st Army connected with the Army of the Turkestan Autonomous Soviet Socialist Republic, which had advanced from Middle Asia. On 24 January the Red 4th Army captured Uralsk.

At the beginning of 1919, the Supreme Command of the White Army decided to advance in two directions. The purpose of the northern advance was to connect with the North Russia Front and to strike at Petrograd; the purpose of the southern advance was to crush the Red front on the middle Volga river and to advance to Moscow.

The Whites had three armies:

- Orenburg Independent Army (cossacks) (11,000 – 13,000 men, commanded by Alexander Dutov) on the southern flank, from May renamed the Southern Army of 25,000 men under General Petr Belov
- Western Army (42,000 – 48,000 men, 120 guns, commanded by Mikhail Hanzhin) in the middle between Birsk and Ufa
- Siberian Army (45,000 – 52,000 men, 83 guns, commanded by Radola Gajda) on the northern flank between Glazov and Perm
- Another 25,000 Orenburg and Ural Cossack fighters (the Ural Army), south of the Dutov-Belov Army.

The Reds had three armies in the south:

- 4th Army (commanded by Mikhail Frunze),
- Turkestan Army (commanded by Georgy Zinoviev) and
- 1st Army (commanded by Gaya Gai) in the region to the north of the Caspian Sea (52,000 men, 200 guns and 613 machineguns in common)

and three armies to the north of them:

- 5th Army (10,000 men, 42 guns and 142 machineguns, commanded by Jan Blumberg), defending a 200 km front in the center
- 2nd army (22,000 men, 70 guns and 475 machineguns, commanded by Vasilii Shorin), near Sarapul
- 3rd Army (27,000 men, 69 guns and 491 machineguns, commanded by Mikhail Lashevich, since 5 March – Sergei Mezheninov), near Perm railway.

Therefore, on the northern flank both sides were equal, the Whites were stronger in the center (49,000 of Hanzhin's soldiers against the Red 5th Army's 10,000), and the Reds had an advantage on the southern flank (52,000 against 19,000). Both sides decided to strike on the right flank (the Whites on the right flank and in the center) and to cut the communication lines of their opponent's left flank. At the end of February, the Whites pushed back the left flank of the Reds' 2nd Army, forcing it to retreat.

== Offensive ==
On 4 March, the Siberian Army of the Whites began its advance. On 8 March it captured Okhansk and Osa and continued its advance to the Kama River. On 10 April they captured Sarapul and closed in on Glazov. On 15 April soldiers of Siberian Army's right flank made contact with detachments of the Northern Front in a sparsely populated area near the Pechora River.

On 6 March Hanzhin's Western Army stroke between the Red 5th and 2nd Armies. After four days of fighting the Red 5th Army was crushed, its remains retreated onto Simbirsk and Samara. The Reds had no forces to cover Chistopol with its bread storages. It was a strategical breakthrough, the commanders of Red's 5th Army fled from Ufa and the White Western Army captured Ufa without a fight on 16 March. On 6 April they took Sterlitamak, Belebey the next day and Bugulma on 10 April.

In the South, Dutov's Orenburg Cossacks conquered Orsk on 9 April and advanced towards Orenburg.

After receiving information about the defeat of the 5th Army, Mikhail Frunze, who had become commander of the Red Southern Army Group, decided not to advance, but to defend his positions and wait for reinforcements. As a result, the Red Army was able to stop the White advance on the southern flank and to prepare its counteroffensive.

== Aftermath ==
The White Army had made a strategic breakthrough in the center, but the Red Army had been able to prepare its counteroffensive on the southern flank.
On 22 April, Mikhail Frunze launched his successful Eastern Front counteroffensive against the over-extended Western Army.

== See also ==
- Bibliography of the Russian Revolution and Civil War
- Outline of the Russian Revolution and Civil War
- Index of articles related to the Russian Revolution and Civil War
- The "Russian" Civil Wars, 1916–1926: Ten Years That Shook the World
- Russia in Flames: War, Revolution, Civil War, 1914–1921
- Russia in Revolution: An Empire in Crisis, 1890 to 1928
- Russia: Revolution and Civil War, 1917—1921
- The Russian Revolution: A New History

== Sources ==
- Н.Е.Какурин, И.И.Вацетис "Гражданская война. 1918–1921" (N.E.Kakurin, I.I.Vacietis "Civil War. 1918–1921") – Sankt-Peterburg, "Polygon" Publishing House, 2002. ISBN 5-89173-150-9
