= Žanis Blumbergs =

Soviet military personnel

Zanis Blumbergs
- Born: September 21, 1889
- Died: April 26, 1938 (aged 48)
- Allegiance: Russian Empire; Soviet Union
- Branch: Imperial Russian Army; Soviet Red Army
- Rank: Komdiv
- Commands: 5th Army (RSFSR); 11th Rifle Corps
- Conflicts: World War I; Russian Civil War; White Army Spring Offensive; Eastern Front counteroffensive

Žanis Blumbergs (Russian: Жан Ка́рлович Блю́мберг; September 21, 1889 – April 26, 1938) was a Soviet military leader and division commander (November 26, 1935).

== Biography ==
He was born on September 21, 1889, in the town of Altauc, Courland Governorate (now in Vecauce Parish, Latvia) in a family of Latvian peasants. In 1907 he graduated from the city school in Mitau (Jelgava). In 1908 he entered the military service as a volunteer. In the years 1910-1913. - Junker of the Vilna Military School.

After being released as second lieutenant on 08/06, 1913, he served in the 99th Ivangorod Infantry Regiment. He participated in World War I, during which he held the positions of company commander, head of horse and foot reconnaissance teams, and head of a machine gun team. The last rank and position in the old army is captain, battalion commander.

In the Red Army since June 1918. Member of the Russian Civil War. He fought on the Eastern, North-Western and Southern Fronts, holding the following positions: in 1918 - commander of the 3rd Brigade of the Latvian Rifle Division, commanded the 5th Army from September 1918 to April 1919 and went through all the heavy battles with it the spring offensive of the whites, in 1919 - commander of the Northern Group of Forces of the 7th Army, assistant commander of this army, head of the rear of the 42nd Infantry Division, commander of the 2nd Brigade of the same division; in 1920 - commander of the 126th and 124th brigades of the 42nd Infantry Division.

After the Civil War, he continued to serve in the Red Army. In the years 1921-1923. - Inspector of the Office of military schools of the Red Army, commander of the 1st Infantry Division. In 1922 he graduated from the Higher Academic Courses at the Red Army Military Academy. In the years 1924-1926. - commander of the 11th Rifle Corps. Since the fall of 1926, he was an inspector in the tactical-infantry business of the Training and Combat Directorate of the Main Directorate of the Red Army. Since July 1929 - Assistant Inspector of Infantry of the Red Army.

Since March 1930 - the commandant of the Karelian fortified area. In May 1932 he was appointed Inspector of Engineering Construction of the Office of the Chief of Engineers of the Red Army. Then he worked as the head of the operational-tactical cycle of the Military Engineering Academy of the Red Army, deputy head of the same academy. Since June 1933 - head of the department of strategy and tactics, and since November of the same year - head of the command department of this academy. Since January 1936 - at the disposal of the Office of the commanding officers of the Red Army with secondment to the Office of military schools of the Red Army. In September 1936 he was appointed deputy inspector of infantry of the Red Army. Komdiv (Order of the People's Commissar of Defense of the USSR No. 2494 of November 26, 1935). Candidate member of the CPSU (b) since July 1931

Awarded the Order of the Red Banner (Former commander 5: Prik. RVSR No. 112: 1922)

He was arrested on December 13, 1937. On April 26, 1938, the Military Collegium of the Supreme Court of the USSR sentenced him to death on charges of belonging to an anti-Soviet organization. The verdict was executed on April 26, 1938. He was rehabilitated by the definition of the Military Collegium on July 19, 1957.

Military offices
Preceded by Pēteris Slavens	Commander of the 5th Army RSFSR; October 20, 1918 – April 5, 1919	Succeeded by Mikhail Tukhachevsky
Preceded by	Commander of the 11th Rifle Corps; 1922-1926	Succeeded by

== Bibliography ==
- Cherushev N. S., Cherushev Yu. N. The executed elite of the Red Army (commanders of the 1st and 2nd ranks, comkors, divisional commanders and their equal): 1937-1941. Biographical Dictionary. - M .: Kuchkovo field; Megapolis, 2012 .-- S. 187-188. - 496 p. - 2000 copies. - ISBN 978-5-9950-0217-8.
