= Nicolay Natzvalov =

Russian general (1884–1919)

Nicolay Greogorievich Natzvalov (Russian: Николай Георгиевич Нацвалов; 1884 – May 25, 1919, in Vladivostok) was a participant of World War I and the Chief of Staff of the Special Manchurian Detachment, Major General (1918). He died due to suicide.

== Early life ==
He was born in Transbaikalia into a Georgian - Cossack family (original surname Natsvlishvili).

== War Service ==
He started his military service as a private during the Russo-Japanese War. In the course of the following war, Nicolay Natzvalov was awarded with the Order of St. George of the Fourth Degree and St. George's Honor Weapon.

== Post-War Service ==
After his demobilization, Nicolay Natzvalov joined the White movement in Transbaikal. He was appointed as the Chief of Staff of the Ataman Grigory Semyonov First Joint division and headed the 5th Pri-Amur Corps (December 8, 1918 to May 25, 1919).
