= Fiat-Omsky armoured car =

Russian army wheeled light armored car (1918–1921)

Fiat-Omsky
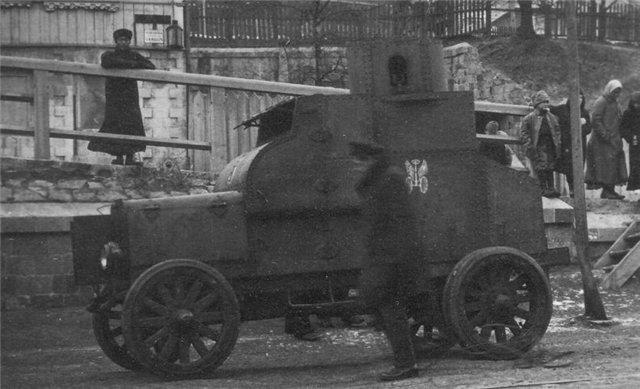
- Fiat-Omsky in Vladivostok, 1919.
- Type: Wheeled light armored car
- Place of origin: Russia

Service history
- In service: 1918–1921
- Used by: White Army; Far Eastern Republic

Production history
- Designer: Unknown
- Manufacturer: Workshops in Omsk and/or Vladivostok
- Produced: 1918–1919 or 1919–1920
- No. built: 15

Specifications
- Crew: 3–4
- Armour: rolled steel
- Main armament: 1–2 7.62mm PM M1910s
- Engine: Fiat 4-cylinder liquid cooled gasoline 50 hp (37 kW)
- Suspension: Dependent, on leaf springs

The Fiat-Omsky (Russian: Фиат-Омский) was a Russian light armored car by the White Army in the Russian Civil War. It was the only serially produced armoured car built by the White Army, and were used exclusively by the Siberian Army on the Eastern Front in the Siberia and Russian Far East regions.

== History ==
The Fiat-Omsky vehicles were commissioned by Admiral Alexander Kolchak, the leading White commander on the Eastern Front, following his return from the United States. At the time, both the White Army and the Red Army were using handmade armoured cars in limited numbers. The Fiat-Omsky was constructed using Fiat Tipo 5 chassis supplied from the United States, with different variations equipped with light armour plating and one or two PM M1910 machine guns attached to wheelhouses on sponsons. There are discrepancies in the construction of the Fiat-Omsky, as there are no known records of the designers, as well as the time and location of their manufacture. Reportedly, a series of about 15 vehicles was built from 1918 to 1919 in Omsk, hence the name "Fiat-Omsky", while other sources state they were built from 1919 to 1920 in Vladivostok, the port where the Fiat frames were delivered. Despite being successful in battle, the Fiat-Omsky vehicles were captured by Red forces during the gradual defeat of the White Army on the Eastern Front, and many of the vehicles were scrapped. Two of the cars entered active service in the People's Revolutionary Army of the Far Eastern Republic until 1921, when they were decommissioned. Many of the Fiat-Omsky cars survived, and at least one was known to come into possession of the Japanese by World War II, however the fate of these cars is unknown.
