= Turkestan Army (RSFSR) =

The Turkestan Army was a field army of the Red Army during the Russian Civil War which existed between March 5 and June 15, 1919.

== History ==
The Turkestan Army was created by an order of Sergey Kamenev, commander of the forces of the Red Eastern Front from the Orenburg Rifle Division and the 3rd Turkestan Cavalry Division. It was part of the Southern Group of Armies of the Eastern Front.
It fought against White troops in the area of Orenburg during the Spring Offensive of the White Army (March-April 1919). From the end of April 1919, it participated in the Counteroffensive of the Eastern Front in 1919, successfully acting in the direction of the main strike towards Buguruslan, Belebey and Ufa. It was disbanded on June 15, 1919.

== Commanders ==
- Georgy Zinoviev (March 11 - May 22, 1919)
- Mikhail Frunze (May 24 - June 15, 1919).

Members of the Revolutionary Military Council included :

- M. D. Kfiyev (March 11 - May 10, 1919),
- A.K. Mirskiy (May 9 - June 7, 1919),
- Filipp Goloshchyokin (April 12 - June 17, 1919)
