= Western Separate Army =

The Western Separate Army (Russian: Западная отдельная армия) was an anti-Bolshevik Army on the Eastern Front during the Russian Civil War, which fought from January 1919 – July 1919 in the Siberia – Ural Region.

== History ==
The army was created on January 1, 1919 in Ural from the 3rd Ural Corps and the Kamskaya and Samara military groups (hereinafter known as the 8th Ufa and 9th Volga Corps).

Later the composition of the Western army increased. By the beginning of March 1919 it consisted of the 3rd Ural Mountain Corps, 2nd Ufa Corps and 6th Ural Corps. The total strength of the Army was then 32,400 infantry, 6,300 cavalry, 570 machine guns and 98 guns. The goals of the Army in the upcoming Spring Offensive of the Russian Army (1919) were Ufa, Samara and Kazan.

The Western army was also in charge of the Southern Army Group (since March 24, 1919), consisting of the 4th Army Corps and the consolidated Sterlitamak Corps. The Southern Army Group numbered about 7,000 infantry, 5,800 cavalry, 143 machine guns, 15 guns and was to advance towards Aktobe and Orenburg.

On March 6, 1919 the Western Army went on the offensive, defeated the 5th and 1st Red Armies, took Ufa (March 14), Belebey, Birsk, Bugulma (April 10), Buguruslan and approached Samara on the Volga River. The Southern Army Group of the Western Army, reached the suburbs of Orenburg by the end of April and, together with the Orenburg Independent Army, besieged the city.

On April 28, the counteroffensive of the Red Eastern Front (42,000 men) against the Western Army (23,000 men) was launched. The southern group of the Red Army hit the flank and rear of the Western army from the district of Orenburg-Buzuluka and, having defeated her at Buguruslan and Belebey, threw her back behind the Belaya River. In the Battle of Ufa (May 25-June 19) The Western Army was again defeated and retreated to Chelyabinsk.

By the end of May the Western Army troops were consolidated into the Volga, Ural and Ufa groups. In July 1919, the White Siberian Army and the Western Army were converted into the 1st, 2nd and 3rd armies (the 3rd Army, mainly on the basis of the Western Army).

The Southern Army Group of the Western Army failed to take Orenburg and, after the beginning of the general retreat of the White Army, was also forced to retreat to the east in August.

== Commanders ==
- Mikhail Hanzhin (January 7 – June 20, 1919)
- Konstantin Sakharov (June 21 - November 1919). (renamed the 3rd Army of the Eastern Front on July 14)
