= 1937 dispute between Czechoslovakia and Portugal =

- Czechoslovakia: Portugal

A 1937 dispute between Czechoslovakia and Portugal over the sale of 600 machine guns led to a break in diplomatic relations between the two countries that lasted nearly 37 years.

The dispute originated with Czechoslovakia's suspicion that Portugal would attempt to transship Czechoslovak machine guns it had purchased to Spain, and Portugal's belief that Czechoslovakia's concern was due to pressure on it from the USSR.

Relations between Czechoslovakia and Portugal were reestablished in 1974 before breaking down again less than a decade later after the two countries accused one another of hostile covert activities.

== Background ==
Historically, the Czech lands and Slovakia had few points of intersecting interest with Portugal. In the 1920s, following the creation of the First Czechoslovak Republic, Czechoslovakia and Portugal began interacting with greater regularity.

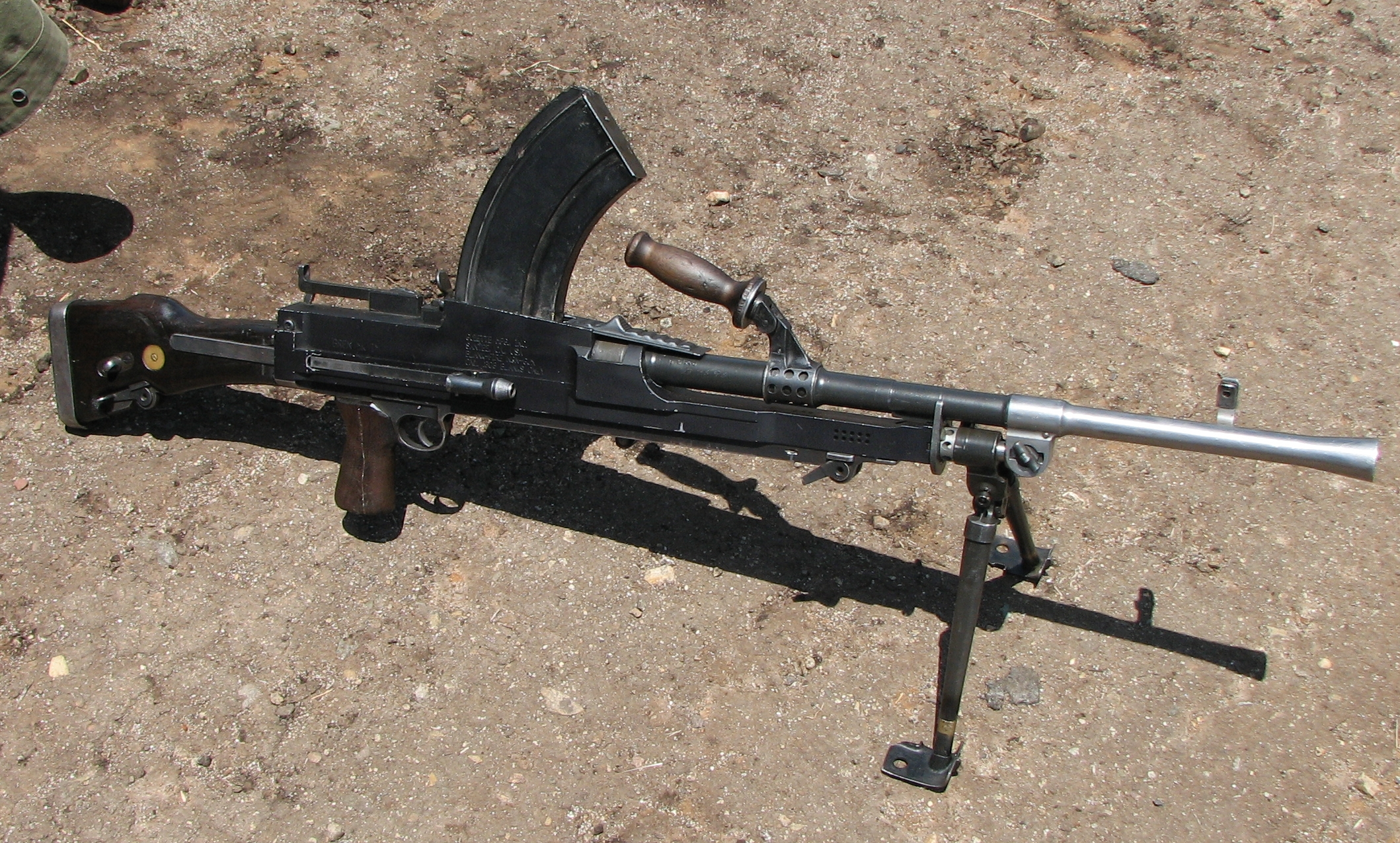
A Bren light machine gun, a British-licensed version of the ZGB 33

During this period, Czechoslovakia had a massive, domestic arms industry led by Škoda Works. In 1937, Škoda Works alone exported more than CSK628 million worth of arms. Competition in the international arms trade between German and Czechoslovak exporters was particularly intense, with the two powers jockeying for domination of continental European arms markets.

The Soviet Union had been gradually exercising greater influence in Czechoslovakia and in 1935, concluded a mutual defense treaty with it. By the following year, military exchanges had occurred between the Soviet Union and Czechoslovakia, with the USSR assessing the potential of Czechoslovakia's highly developed network of aerodromes as staging areas for Soviet Air Forces bomber squadrons in a future European war and Czechoslovakia extending credit to the USSR for weapons procurement.

Against this backdrop, Portugal had aligned itself with the Nationalist forces in Spain's ongoing Civil War, which were battling the Soviet-backed Republican faction. Czechoslovakia, meanwhile, had declared itself neutral in the conflict and made a pledge not to supply either side with armaments, though — it was publicly revealed some decades later — Department II, Czechoslovakia's intelligence agency, was helping Soviet military advisors surreptitiously enter Spain by providing fraudulent passports and other technical assistance. Meanwhile, in early 1937, several Czechoslovak citizens had been expelled from Portugal after the Portuguese government accused them of being engaged in unspecified illicit activities on behalf of Spanish Republican forces. At around the same time, a deadly series of unsolved bombings in Lisbon were attributed to foreigners of an unnamed nation, which some speculated might have been Czechoslovakia.

== Dispute ==
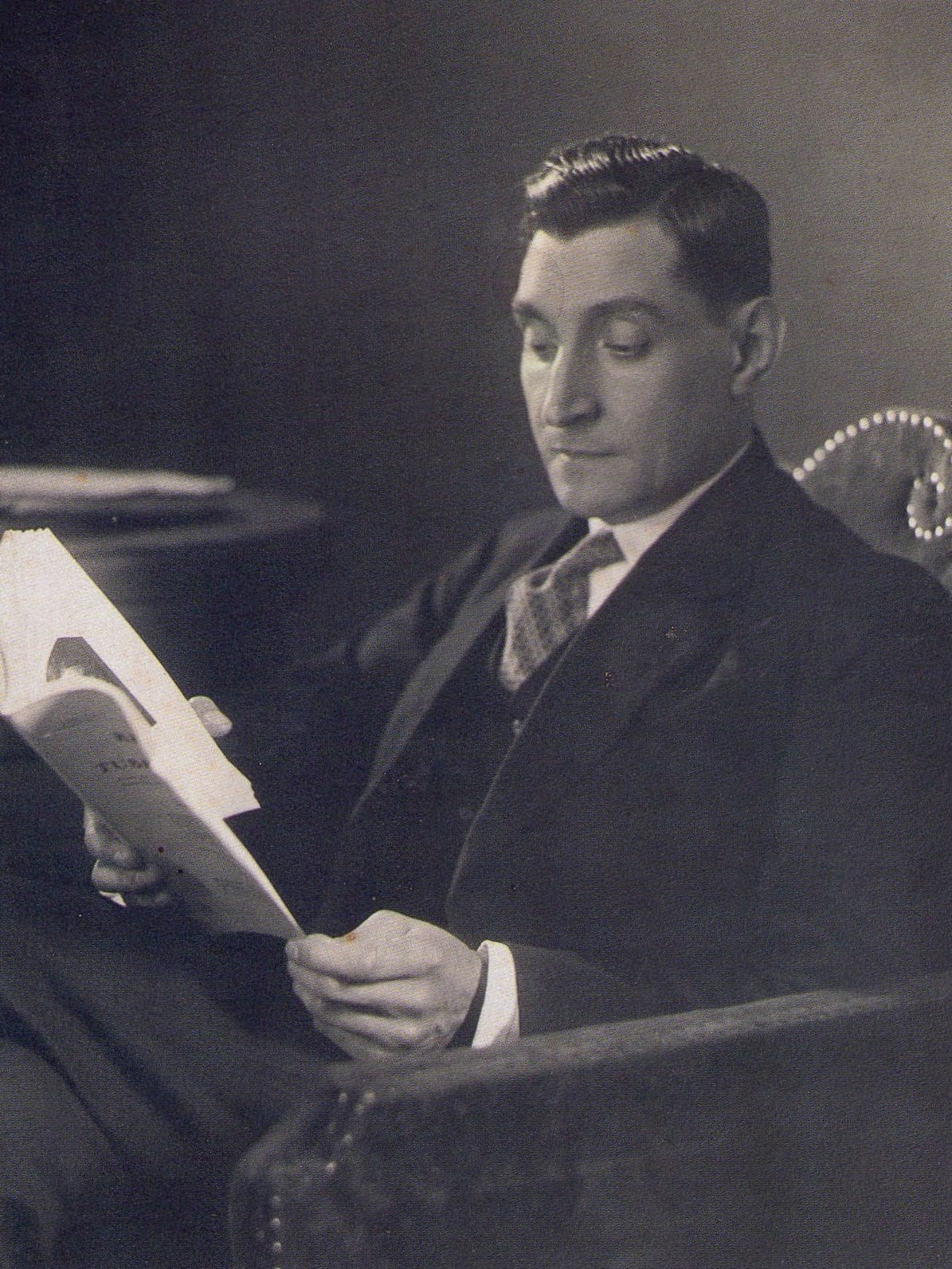
Portuguese prime minister Antonio Salazar (pictured in 1940) was personally offended by the Czechoslovak inquiries as to the ultimate destination of the weapons.

In July 1937, the government of Czechoslovakia requested assurances from Portugal that it intended to use Bren light machine guns (Note: Period media reports identified the weapon in question as the Bren light machine gun. The Bren was a British-licensed version of the Czechoslovak-developed ZGB 33.) on order from the state-owned Czechoslovak Arms Manufacturing Co. to supply its own army and that it would not pass them on to Spanish Nationalist forces then engaged in the Spanish Civil War. Media reports at the time noted that the Portuguese order of 600 machine guns exceeded what were the realistic needs of Portugal's small army.

The request for assurance personally offended Portuguese prime minister António de Oliveira Salazar and relations between Czechoslovakia and Portugal quickly deteriorated. The following month, after the exchange of several démarches between officials of the two countries, Portugal terminated diplomatic relations with Czechoslovakia on 17 August 1937.

=== The Czechoslovak position ===
The Czechoslovak government observed that breaking diplomatic relations over what it characterized as "the failure of commercial negotiations" was "unprecedented in the history of international relations". It also later claimed that the matter was due to the Czechoslovak Arms Manufacturing Co. simply being unable to produce the quantity of weapons desired by Portugal by the agreed-upon delivery date and that it offered to supply an older model machine gun, which Portugal refused.

=== The Portuguese position ===
Though breaking diplomatic relations over disagreement regarding a single weapons sale was noted as an extreme course of action, according to the U.S. Naval Institute's Proceedings, "Portugal defended her action on the ground that the refusal of the Prague government was determined not by its own arms needs or nonintervention pledges but by instructions from Moscow". An article in Diário de Notícias derisively accused Czechoslovakia of "being perhaps the Soviet's largest air base".

== Aftermath ==
Following the breakdown of relations, Italy was named the protecting power of Portugal in Czechoslovakia.

Portugal reestablished relations with Czechoslovakia – then the Czechoslovak Socialist Republic – after the Carnation Revolution, nearly 37 years later on 27 June 1974.

Diplomatic relations were terminated a second time, in 1982. The second break came after Portuguese counterintelligence officers allegedly caught the Czechoslovak ambassador to the country conspiring with the Portuguese Communist Party to stir-up protests against the government of Francisco Pinto Balsemão in advance of the 1983 Portuguese legislative election, while Czechoslovak State Security, in turn, alleged they had discovered the Portuguese ambassador in Prague was engaged in espionage.

== See also ==
- Foreign relations of Portugal
- Gajda Affair
- Foreign relations of the Czech Republic
