= Gajda Affair =

The Gajda Affair was a series of trials, investigations, rumours, and public commentary from 1926 to 1928 regarding conspiracies against the government of Czechoslovakia allegedly masterminded by Radola Gajda. Gajda was convicted, exonerated, then convicted a second-time on a variety of charges ranging from espionage to mutiny and dismissed from the Czechoslovak Army, though the evidence against him has subsequently come under scrutiny. The Gajda Affair has been said to have demonstrated the ability of the Czechoslovak government to maintain civilian control over the armed forces during a period of heightened political tension in many parts of Europe.

== Background ==
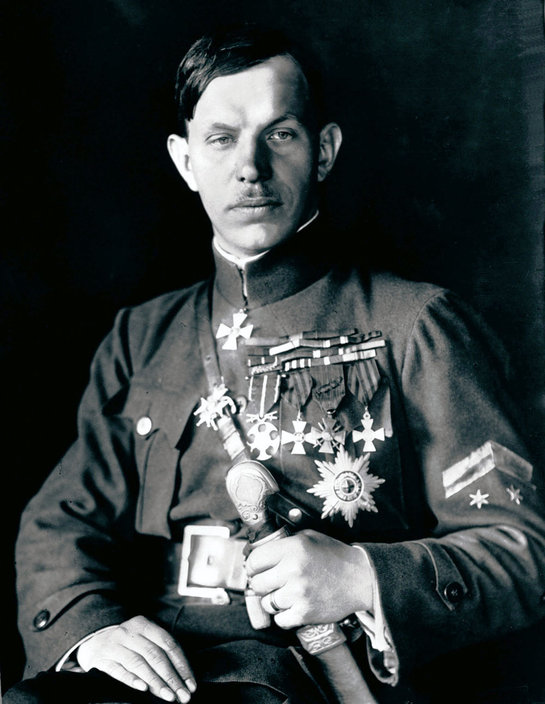
Gen. Radola Gajda (pictured c. 1919) was the central figure in the Gajda Affair.

In 1926 Gen. Radola Gajda, a right-wing Czechoslovak army officer, was given the provisional appointment of chief of the army staff while a new cabinet was being formed following recently concluded elections. In May of that year a military coup in neighbouring Poland, press denouncements of Gajda in left-leaning newspapers, and the approach of the Sokol congress – which some felt might be used by Gajda to stage an event similar to Mussolini's March on Rome – combined to create heightened political tension in Czechoslovakia. The general did not publicly dispute the swirling rumors that he was plotting against the government as military regulations prevented him from issuing statements to the media of his own accord; this contributed to the air of uncertainty. Adding to the complexity of the situation, the Soviet Union – which sought to settle an old score with Gajda – began to secretly feed the Czechoslovak government fabricated information that made Gajda appear to be a Soviet agent.

== Trials ==
On 2 July, President of Czechoslovakia Tomáš Garrigue Masaryk placed Gajda on medical leave and ordered an investigation into his activities. In December 1926 a military tribunal concluded Gadja had provided an agent of the Soviet Union secret French war plans six years prior and ordered his dismissal from the army with a 25 percent cut in pension. The veracity of allegations as to Gajda's alleged contacts with Soviet officials has come under scrutiny as he was known to be virulently anti-Communist. Additionally, subsequently declassified correspondence among French officials has revealed their disbelief that Gajda might even have had access to such plans in 1920, during a period where he was posted to Paris on a training mission.

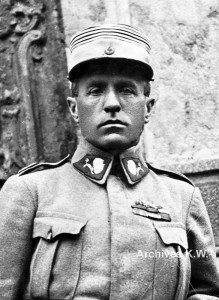
According to prosecutors, Gajda had approached Gen. Josef Šnejdárek (pictured) with a plot to overthrow the Czechoslovak government.

In 1927 Gajda successfully sued the two witnesses who had testified at his court martial for defamation over the allegations they'd made against him. Encapsulating the intrigue of the time, a United Press story that year reported that "Gajda has been known to Czecho-Slovakians as a national hero, a spy, and a suspicious militarist of German origin".

In response to Gajda's exoneration in civil court, the Czechoslovak government produced new evidence against him in the form of telegrams it claimed to have intercepted and decoded in 1921. It also alleged he had discussed the overthrow of the Czechoslovak government with Josef Šnejdárek. Gajda was ordered to stand trial anew in 1928 and was again convicted on all counts, with his 25 percent loss of pension being reaffirmed. Historian Jonathan Zorach has questioned the conclusion of the second court martial by noting that Šnejdárek and Gajda were not on close terms and Šnejdárek would have been an unusual choice for a confidant for Gajda. Gerald Protheroe has also questioned why the Czechoslovak government, had it intercepted telegrams in 1921, would have waited five years to act upon them.

== Aftermath ==
In the aftermath of the Gajda Affair, legislation was advanced by the Czechoslovak government to disenfranchise the army officer corps and the gendarmerie as a means of neutralizing the military as a political force. The Gajda Affair has been said to have demonstrated the ultimate ability of the Czechoslovak civilian government to maintain its supremacy over the armed forces during a fragile period for democracy in many parts of Europe. It also served to splinter the political right among veterans of the Czechoslovak Legion.

== See also ==
- 1937 dispute between Czechoslovakia and Portugal
- 1948 Czechoslovak coup d'état
