= Eastern Front counteroffensive =

1919 episode of the Russian Civil War

- Part of the Eastern Front of the Russian Civil War
Date	28 April – July 1919
Location	Ural Region; Volga Region
Result	Bolshevik victory

Belligerents
(Russian Soviet Federative Socialist Republic) Russian SFSR: Red Army	Russian State: White Army

Commanders and leaders
Mikhail Tukhachevsky; Hayk Bzhishkyan; Vasilii Shorin; Mikhail Lashevich; Mikhail Frunze; Žanis Bļumbergs	Alexander Kolchak; Radola Gajda; Mikhail Hanzhin; Petr Belov

The Eastern Front counteroffensive (April–July 1919) was an episode of the Russian Civil War.

== Background ==
In 1917, the Russian Bolshevik Party staged a revolution against Alexander Kerensky's Provisional Government that led to a civil war. During the spring of 1919 the Kolchak army offensive created a strategic breakthrough in the center of the Red Army's Eastern Font, while the Reds were preparing their own offensive on the southern flank.

== Idea ==
At the time of the White Army offensive, the Reds had a big force on the southern flank. The White Army was dispersed into several groups and the Reds attempted to crush those groups from south to north one by one. Reserves were used to rebuild the Red's 5th Army and delay the Whites' advancement in the center of the front.

== Battles ==
On the southern flank, the White Orenburg Independent Army tried to capture Orenburg without success. The new commander General Petr Belov decided to use his reserve, the 4th Corps, to outflank Orenburg from the north. But Red commander Gaya Gai regrouped and crushed the Whites during a 3-day battle from 22–25 April and the remains of the White forces changed sides. As a result, there was no cover for the White Western Army's rear communications (commander Mikhail Hanzhin). On 25 April the Supreme Command of the Reds' Eastern Front ordered an advance.

On 28 April the Reds crushed 2 divisions of the Whites in the region to the south-east of Buguruslan. While suppressing the flank of the advancing White armies, the Reds' command ordered the Southern Group to advance to the North-West. On 4 May the Red 5th Army captured Buguruslan, and the Whites had to quickly retreat to Bugulma. On 6 May Mikhail Frunze (commander of Red's Southern Group) attempted to surround the White forces, but the Whites quickly retreated to the east. On 13 May the Red 5th Army captured Bugulma without a fight.

Aleksandr Samoilo (new commander of the Red's Eastern Front) took the 5th Army from the Southern Group and ordered a strike on the Northeast in retribution for their assistance to the Northern Group. The Southern Group was reinforced by 2 rifle divisions. The outflanked Whites had to retreat from Belebey to the east, but Samoilo didn't realize that the Whites were defeated and ordered his troops to stop. Frunze didn't agree, and on 19 May Samoilo ordered his troops to pursue the enemy.

The Whites concentrated 6 infantry regiments near Ufa and decided to outflank the Turkestan Army. On 28 May the Whites crossed the Belaya River, but were crushed on 29 May. On 30 May the Red 5th Army also crossed the Belaya River and captured Birsk on 7 June. Also on 7 June the Red's Southern Group crossed the Belaya River and captured Ufa on 9 June. On 16 June the Whites began a general retreat in the eastern direction on the whole front.

== Aftermath ==
The defeat of the Whites in the Center and South, enabled the Red Army to cross the Ural Mountains. The advance of the Red Army in the Center and South forced the Whites' Northern group (the Siberian Army) to retreat, because the Red armies were now able to cut its communications.

== See also ==
- Bibliography of the Russian Revolution and Civil War
- Outline of the Russian Revolution and Civil War
- Index of articles related to the Russian Revolution and Civil War
- The "Russian" Civil Wars, 1916–1926: Ten Years That Shook the World
- Russia in Flames: War, Revolution, Civil War, 1914–1921
- Russia in Revolution: An Empire in Crisis, 1890 to 1928
- Russia: Revolution and Civil War, 1917—1921
- The Russian Revolution: A New History

== Sources ==
- Н.Е.Какурин, И.И.Вацетис "Гражданская война. 1918–1921" (N.E.Kakurin, I.I.Vacietis "Civil War. 1918–1921") – Sankt-Peterburg, "Polygon" Publishing House, 2002. ISBN 5-89173-150-9
