= Boris Annenkov =

Russian military personnel (1889–1927)

Ataman Boris Annenkov
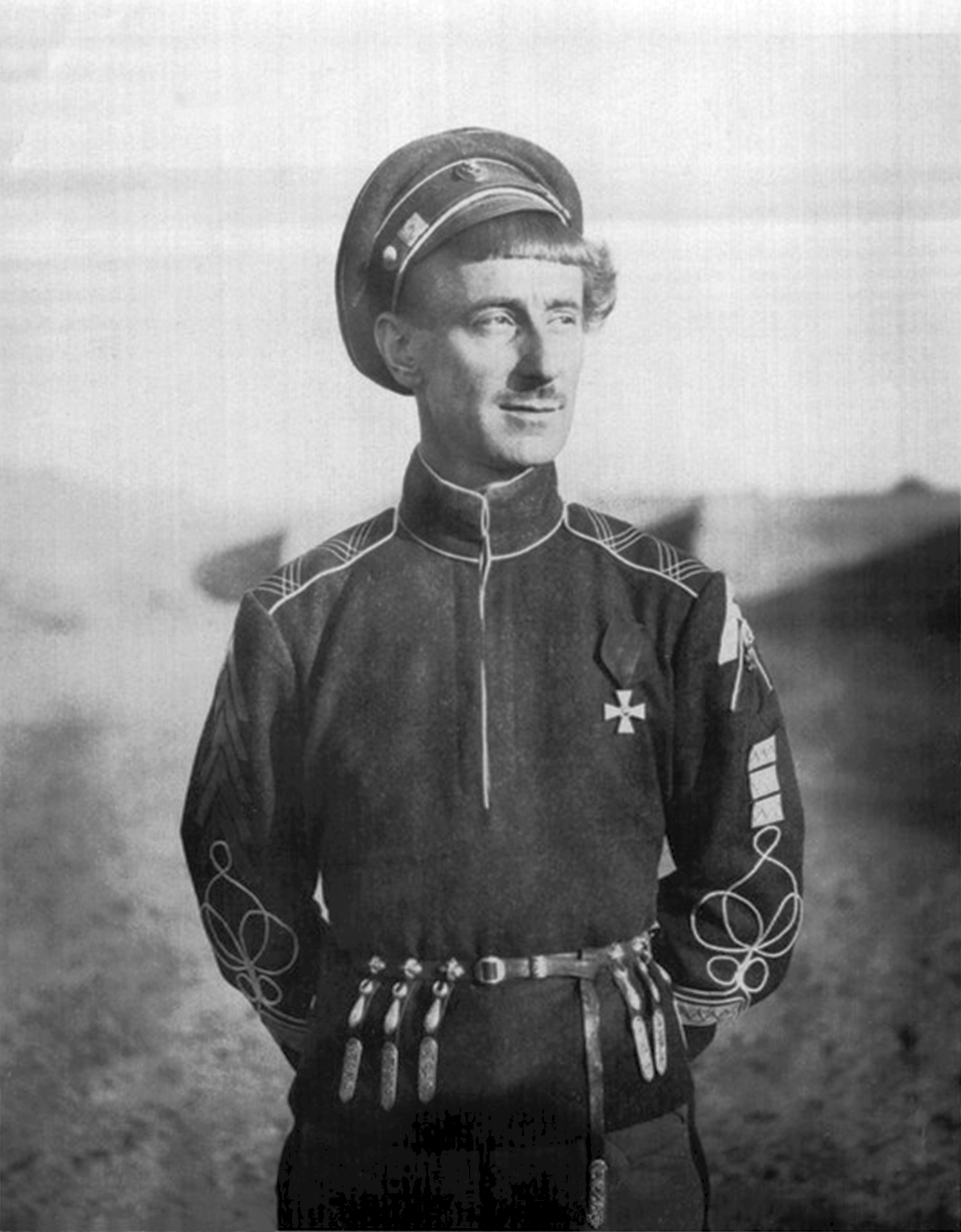
- Native name: Борис Владимирович Анненков
- Born: February 9, 1889; Russian Empire
- Died: April 25, 1927 (aged 38) Semey, Kazakh SSR, Soviet Union
- Cause of death: Execution by shooting
- Rank: Major General

Boris Vladimirovich Annenkov (Russian: Борис Владимирович Анненков; February 9, 1889 – April 25, 1927) was an ataman of the Siberian Cossacks, major general and commander of the Seven Rivers Army. Numerous military crimes were committed by troops under his command against the Red Army and civilians over the course of the Russian Civil War.

== Biography ==
Grandson of the Decembrist Ivan Alexandrovich Annenkov, Boris Vladimirovitch was born into the family of Vladimir Ivanovitch Annenkov, a retired colonel, and is part of the russian nobility of Volhynia.

Trained at the Odessa Cadet School and the Alexander Military School in Moscow, Boris Annenkov began his service with the 1st Siberian Cossack Regiment before moving to the 4th Siberian Cossack Regiment in Kokshetau. In 1914 a mutiny broke out in the regiment and Annenkov was appointed temporary commander by the mutineers. Sentenced to 1 year and 4 months' imprisonment, he did not serve his sentence but was sent to the front against the Germans.

For his combat valor he received between 1915 and 1917 a Golden Weapon for Bravery (known as Saint George Sword), as well as the Legion of Honor order from the hands of General Paul Pau.

After the Russian Revolution of 1917, Annenkov was sent back to Omsk with his men in December in order to dissolve the counter-revolutionary unit. Refusing to allow himself to be disarmed, he then began the fight against the Bolsheviks.

In March 1918 he was elected ataman of the Siberian Cossacks by a Cossack assembly whose legality is disputed. He fought the Red troops in the southern Urals and Central Asia and became the commander of the independent Army of Seven Rivers in August 1919. During the winter of 1919-1920 he formally joined the forces of General Dutov; however, almost immediately, there was a conflict between him and Dutov. Annenkov and his troops were responsible for massacring 1,500 civilians near Slavgorod uyezd and another 2,000 to 3,000 in Yekaterinburg in July 1919.

In the spring of 1920, Annenkov was forced to retreat towards the Chinese border. On April 28 he crossed the border with the rest of his men and settled in Ürümqi. He enjoyed a sour relationship with Xinjiang clique warlord Yang Zengxin, who maneuvered to get rid of the Ataman and his troops. The Chinese authorities arrested him in March 1921 and he was not released until three years later thanks to the efforts of General Nikolay Denisov and the support of British and Japanese representatives.

On April 7, 1927, Annenkov was captured by Feng Yuxiang and delivered to the Chekists active in the region. Deported to the Soviet Union, he was shot as a war criminal on August 25, 1927, in Semipalatinsk along with Denisov.

In 1990s, his case was reviewed by the Russian General Prosecutor's Office, and he was refused rehabilitation.

== Culture and media ==
=== Cinema and TV ===
- 1933 : Annenkovchtchina (Анненковщина), film by Nikolaï Beresnev; the role of Annenkov was performed by Boris Livanov
