= 2nd Steppe Siberian Corps =

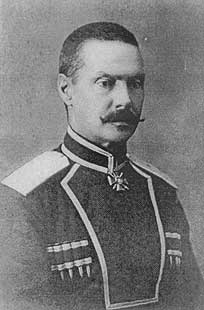
- Country: Russia
- Allegiance: (Russian Empire) White movement
- Branch: Siberian Army
- Size: Corps
- Engagements: Russian Civil War

Commanders
- Commanders: Pavel Ivanov-Rinov; Grigory Verzhbitsky

The 2nd Steppe Siberian Corps (Russian: 2-й Степной Сибирский корпус, romanized: 2-y Stepnoy Sibirskiy korpus) was an infantry corps of the White Guard's Siberian Army during the Russian Civil War. It was formed on 12 June 1918, by Polkovnik Pavel Ivanov-Rinov in Omsk.

On 3 January 1919, a 3rd Steppe Siberian Army Corps under A' Thomas command was formed by separating the 3rd and 4th Rifle Divisions from the 2nd Steppe Siberian Corps.

== Commanders ==
- Pavel Ivanov-Rinov (June 7 - September 5, 1918)
- Aleksei Matkovsky (September 6 - December 26, 1918)
- Vladimir Brzhezovsky (January - September 1919).

== Sources ==
- Наступление армий Колчака весной 1919 года
- Знамёна Белых армий
