= 4th Eastern Siberian Corps =

- Country: Russia
- Allegiance: (Russian Empire) White movement
- Branch: Siberian Army
- Size: Corps
- Engagements: Russian Civil War

Commanders
- Commander: Alexander Ellerz-Usov

The 4th Eastern Siberian Corps (Russian: 4-й Восточно-Сибирский корпус) was formed in September 1918. On the orders of the Major General P. P. Ivanov-Rinov, the commander of the Siberian Army, on 17 September 1918, A. V. Ellerts-Usov, the commander of the Irkutsk military district, took over the corps. The Corps was one of the main formations of the Siberian Army during the Russian Civil War.

It was commanded by Alexander Ellerz-Usov and had its headquarters in Irkutsk.

It was planned to include the 3rd and 8th Siberian rifle divisions in the corps, with the territories of the Irkutsk province and the Trans-Baikal region (with the exception of its Cossack population) were allocated for manning. Colonel I.V. Tonkikh was appointed chief of staff of the corps, Colonel N.V. Glavatsky, chief quartermaster, and Colonel N. Petukhov, artillery inspector.

By early December, there were 19,150 people in the 4th East Siberian Corps:

- the 9th (formerly 8th) Siberian Division (Trans-Baikal Region) with 3 artillery divizions (8,150 soldiers),
- the 3rd Siberian Personnel Division (Irkutsk Province) with 4 artillery divizions (8,350 soldiers),
- 8th Siberian division (Yenisei province) (1,500 soldiers),
- 4th Irkutsk mounted brigade (Irkutsk and Krasnoyarsk) - 800 people.

On 18 December 1918 A.V. Kolchak ordered the abolition of the corps areas of the Siberian Army and form military districts instead. The East Siberian Corps became the Central Siberian Military District, and from 16 January 1919 - the Irkutsk Military District. By order of A.V. Kolchak of January 3, 1919, the headquarters of the 4th East Siberian Corps was abolished, and its parts went to replenish the 3rd Irkutsk Siberian Rifle Division.

== Sources ==
- Наступление армий Колчака весной 1919 года
- Знамёна Белых армий
- Novikov P. A. Civil War in Eastern Siberia / Ed. V.A. Blagovo, S.A. Sapozhnikova . - M .: Centerpolygraph, 2005 .-- 415 p. - ISBN 5-9524-1400-1 .
