= 5th Pri-Amur Corps =

White Russian Unit

The 5th Pri-Amur Corps (Russian: 5-й Приамурский корпус) was a formation of the Siberian Army, part of the anti-Bolshevik White movement during the Russian Civil War. It primarily operated in the Transbaikal region and was headquartered in the city of Chita. The 5th Corps was formed from the Transbaikal Cossacks and various other volunteer forces fighting under Ataman (chief) Grigory Semyonov, as part of his Special Manchurian Unit (Особый маньчжурский отряд, OMO).

== History ==
After Grigory Semyonov's OMO, based in Chita and sponsored by Japanese intervention forces, made contact with the Provisional Siberian Government under Pyotr Vologodsky in September 1918, he was promoted by the Omsk government's war minister Pavel Ivanov-Rinov to the rank of colonel and was designated as the commander of the 5th Pri-Amur Army Corps. The OMO and other units in the Russian Far East were subordinated to the new 5th Corps. The unit received equipment and money from the Japanese, including rifles, ammunition, field guns, and clothing. In addition to artillery, the 5th Corps also operated eight aircraft and several armored trains. There was friction between Semyonov's loyalists in the OMO and the other units of the 5th Corps that were more loyal to the Provisional Siberian Government, and they viewed each other with suspicion. When Admiral Alexander Kolchak, a rival of the ataman and his Japanese backers, took control of the Siberian government in a coup, the hostility between the two factions escalated. Semyonov blocked telegraph communications between Omsk and Vladivostok, and refused to follow his orders. In December 1918 Kolchak issued Directive No. 60 which accused Semyonov of banditry and atrocities, removing him from command of the 5th Corps. In mid-December, Semyonov renamed the 5th Pri-Amur Corps to the "Separate Eastern Siberian Army" and went under that name, with the 5th Corps being dissolved.

== Organization ==
In addition to Semyonov's OMO, which consisted of some 5,000 men, the 5th Corps also included the following in its order of battle as of October 1918:

- 1st Semyonov Infantry Regiment
- 2nd Manchurian Infantry Regiment
- Mongol-Buryat Cossack Regiment
- 8th Transbaikal Cossack Division
  - Onon Cossack Regiment
  - 2nd Daursky Regiment
  - Chita Cossack Regiment
  - Nerchinsk Regiment
  - Argun Cossack Regiment
- 9th Infantry Division
  - 32nd Regiment
  - 33rd Regiment
  - 36th Regiment
  - Ussuri Regiment
- United Division of Amur and Ussuri Cossacks
- 2nd Cavalry Regiment
- Several other regiments in the Far East

The 5th Corps consisted of a variety of different nationalities, with a large number of Mongols, Chinese, and indigenous Siberian peoples, as well as mercenaries and recruits from European countries, such as Belgium, Serbia, and Romania. It was common for units of foreign troops to be commanded by Russian officers, similarly to the British Indian Army or the French Foreign Legion. Many of the troops were considered unreliable and some regiments would disappear from the order of battle after some time. Even among the officer corps there were disciplinary problems. In November 1918, the Ataman Semyonov Military School was set up in Chita to train new officers for 13 months, and these cadets became some of Semyonov's strongest supporters. In Khabarovsk, a city under the administration of Ivan Kalmykov, the self-proclaimed Ataman of the Ussuri Cossack Host, subordinated to the 5th Corps, the Ataman Kalmykov Military School was opened as well. It had 22 cadets who were trained in a ten-month course.

== See also ==
- Nicolay Natzvalov

== Books ==
- Bisher, James (2005). White Terror: Cossack Warlords of the Trans-Siberian. Routledge. ISBN 0-714-65690-9.
