= 3rd Ural Corps =

- Country: Russia
- Allegiance: (Russian Empire) White movement
- Branch: Siberian Army
- Size: Corps
- Engagements: Russian Civil War

Commanders
- Commander: Mikhail Hanzhin

The 3rd Ural Corps (Russian: 3-й Уральский армейский корпус) was one of the main formations of the Siberian Army during the Russian Civil War. Its commander was Col. Isaac Wimett and its headquarters were situated in Chelyabinsk.

On January 3, 1919, the 6th Ural Army Corps was formed by separating the 11th and 12th Ural rifle divisions from the 3rd Ural Army Corps. The 6th Ural Army Corps was disbanded on May 26, 1919.

== Sources ==
- Третий Уральский армейский корпус
- Сегодня 100 лет со дня сформирования 3-го Уральского армейского корпуса
