= Radola Gajda =

Czech military officer and politician (1892-1948)

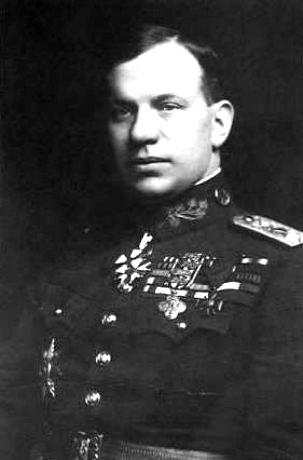
- Radola Gajda in 1933
- Born: 14 February 1892; Kotor, Kingdom of Dalmatia, Austria-Hungary
- Died: 15 April 1948 (aged 56); Prague, Czechoslovakia
- Military career
- Allegiance: Austria-Hungary; Kingdom of Montenegro; Russian Empire; Czechoslovakia
- Service years: 1910–1911; 1914–1915 (Austro-Hungarian Army); 1915–1916 (Montenegrin Army); 1917–1919; 1920–1926 (Czechoslovak Army); 1919 (White Army)
- Rank: Captain (Montenegro); Major General (Czechoslovakia)
- Unit: Czechoslovak Legion
- Commands: Siberian Army
- Conflicts: World War I: Battle of Zborov (1917); Russian Civil War: Battle of Lake Baikal

Radola Gajda, born as Rudolf Geidl (14 February 1892 – 15 April 1948) was a Czech military commander and politician.

== Early years ==
Geidl's father was an officer in the Austro-Hungarian Army based in Kotor. His mother was a poor Montenegrin noblewoman. Later, the family moved to Kyjov, Moravia, where Geidl studied at a secondary grammar school. In 1910 he went through one year of compulsory military service in Mostar. Afterwards Geidl left for the Balkans and likely took part in the Balkan Wars (1912–13). At the start of World War I he re-joined the Austro-Hungarian Army and served in Dalmatia and Sarajevo. In September 1915 he was taken prisoner in Višegrad, Bosnia.

== Legions ==
Immediately after his capture, Geidl switched sides and was commissioned as a captain in the Montenegrin Army. Having some experience as an apothecary, he pretended to be a physician. Following the collapse of the Montenegrin Army in 1916, Gajda escaped into Russia where he joined a Serbian battalion as a physician.

At the end of 1916 the battalion was destroyed and Gajda joined the Czechoslovak Legions (30 January 1917) as a staff captain. Gajda proved himself as an able commander in the Battle of Zborov and quickly rose through the military hierarchy.

During the evacuation of the Legion in May 1918 via the Trans-Siberian Railway violence erupted between the Legion and the Bolsheviks. Czechoslovak soldiers quickly occupied large tracts of the railway east of the Volga. Gajda commanded the area from Novonikolayevsk (Novosibirsk) north to Irkutsk. Aggressive tactics, sometimes against the orders of his superiors, helped to defeat the Bolshevik forces and connect all units of the Legion. This contributed to his conflict with Tomáš Garrigue Masaryk, who wanted the Legions to stay neutral in the Russian Civil War.

After the capture of Yekaterinburg by the Legion and the White Army in July 1918, he set up his headquarters in the city, establishing his office at the Ipatiev House, incidentally where the imprisoned Romanovs had been murdered by the Bolsheviks less than a week prior to the capture of the city. The most successful operation was the capture of Perm (24 December 1918) where the Legion took 20,000 prisoners and seized 5,000 railway cars, 60 cannons, 1,000 machine guns and the fleet frozen in the Kama River. Gajda enjoyed widespread popularity amongst his troops and throughout the White movement. He was promoted to Major-General and nicknamed "the Siberian Ataman" and "the Siberian Tiger." He later accepted an invitation from Aleksandr Kolchak to become a commander in his army.

His career with Kolchak was less successful—the Red Army had begun to take the initiative while Kolchak's forces dwindled away. Gajda, out of Kolchak's favor, was dismissed on 5 July 1919. After involving himself in the unsuccessful mutiny of Esers against Kolchak (17 November 1919) he escaped from Siberia and sailed to Europe.

== Military career in Czechoslovakia ==
After arriving in Czechoslovakia in early 1920, Gajda was given a pension and the rank of General, but was not assigned a command. In November 1920 he was sent to study military theory at the École supérieure de guerre in France. He also studied agriculture at the Institut Technique de Pratique Agricole.

Gajda returned two years later. On 9 October 1922, he was given command of the 11th Division in Košice, Slovakia. His involvement in the cultural life of the region soon endeared him to the locals. On 1 December 1924 he was named Deputy Chief of the General Staff in Prague under General Eugène Mittelhauser, head of French military mission in Czechoslovakia. Gajda became a rival of Mittelhauser and Mittelhauser's predecessor Maurice Pellé. In this capacity, Gajda worked successfully to limit the influence of the mission, which was brought to an end in 1926. On 20 March 1926 he became Acting Chief of the General Staff. In his position he backed up former legionnaires against former loyalist Austrian officers.

Under pressure from president Tomáš Garrigue Masaryk Gajda was forced to retire, because he had publicly shown himself sympathetic to Italian fascism. Combined with envy, political intrigue and fear of a military coup (similar to the contemporary May Coup in Poland) this led to the dismissal of the ambitious general.

== Politics ==
Still a young man of 34, Gajda decided to turn to politics. At the end of 1926 he took part in the founding of the National Fascist Community (Czech: Národní obec fašistická, NOF), modeled on Benito Mussolini's National Fascist Party and became its leader on 2 January 1927. In 1929 the party took several seats in parliament. In 1931 Gajda was briefly imprisoned and stripped of military rank due to a prior scandal.

During the night of 21–22 January 1933, the Židenice Mutiny broke out in Brno. This was an attempt on the part of 70 to 80 local fascists to overthrow the government by means of a military coup. The mutiny was immediately suppressed. Gajda was arrested the next day and charged with inciting the coup. Initially he was absolved of wrongdoing but after political pressure the verdict was revised. Gajda was sentenced to six months in prison and the forfeiture of his military pension.

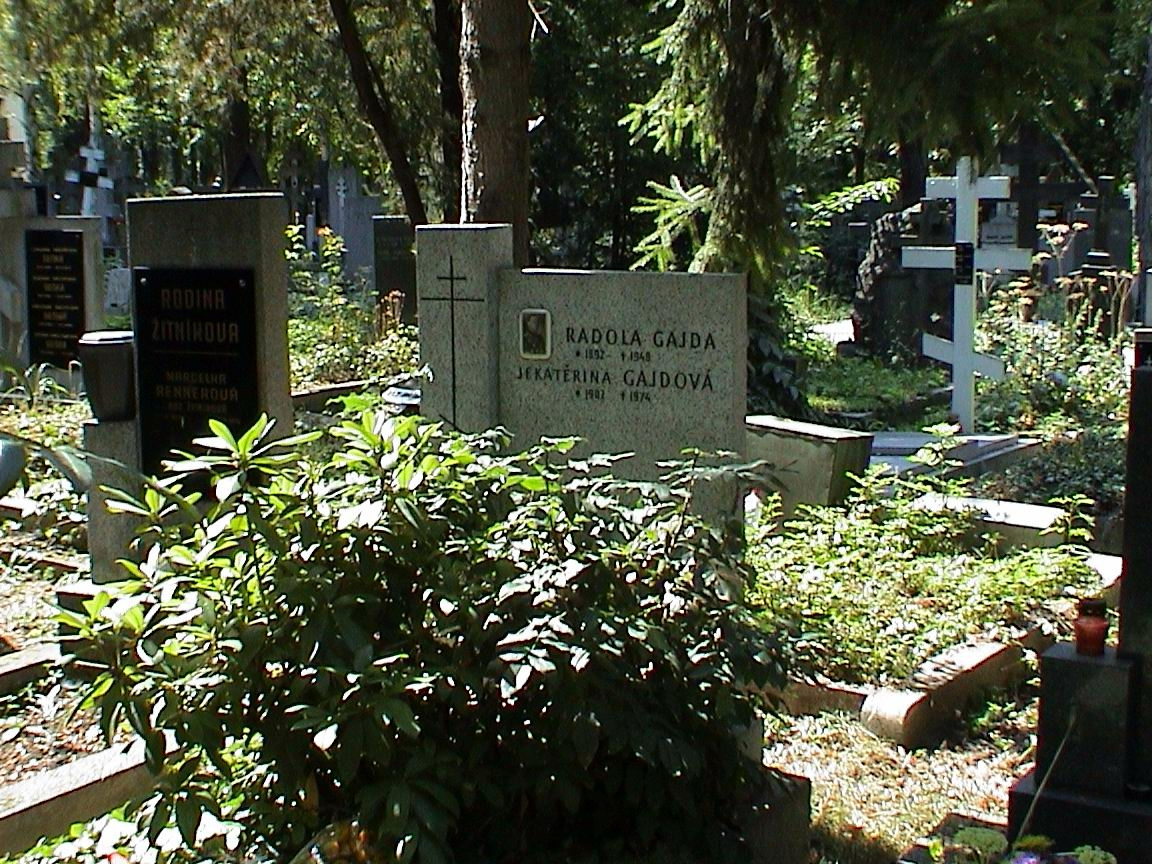
Grave of Radola Gajda in Prague (2003), damaged by vandals in April 2007

The NOF was somewhat successful in the 1935 elections and Gajda obtained a seat in parliament, which he was to hold until 1939. At this time, the NOF had a strong anti-German orientation, supported a military buildup and favored war with Nazi Germany over the Sudetenland. (After the Munich Agreement Gajda, as a gesture of defiance, returned all French and British honors and medals.) In 1939 he was rehabilitated and restored to the rank of General. He also became active in the newly established Party of National Unity (Czech: Strana národní jednoty).

During March 1939, the Czechoslovak political scene was in state of turmoil. Several coups were attempted, one in anticipation of making Gajda the new head of state. These amateurish coups ended in fiasco and several days later the remaining Czech lands were occupied by Nazi Germany.

Gajda was marginalized during the occupation and abandoned politics. He occasionally assisted the Czech resistance by helping army officers to flee into Poland and by hiding the resistance activities of his son. He was investigated by the Gestapo but avoided imprisonment. When World War II ended Gajda was imprisoned (12 May 1945) and tortured. He practically lost his eyesight while jailed.

== Last years ==
In April 1947 he was brought to trial for "propagation of Fascism and Nazism", for which the prosecutor requested a life sentence. Gajda's guilt was far from clear and the resulting sentence of two years allowed him to leave prison shortly thereafter. Penniless and forgotten, he died several months later.

== See also ==
- Gajda Affair
