= Perm Operation (1918–19) =

Coordinates: 58.0139°N 56.2489°E

- Part of the Eastern Front of the Russian Civil War
Date	29 November 1918 to 28 January 1919
Location	Ural Region
Result	First battle: White victory; Second battle: Indecisive

Belligerents
Russian SFSR	White movement

Commanders and leaders
Sergey Kamenev; Mikhail Lashevich (3d Army); Vasily Shorin (2nd Army from January 19)	Anatoly Pepelyayev

Units involved
Red Army	Siberian Army

Strength
About 36,000 in first battle 38,000 in second battle	About 45,000 in first battle 8,000 in second battle

Casualties and losses
Very High	Very High

The Perm Operation (November 1918 – January 1919), sometimes called the Perm Catastrophe, was a military operation on the Eastern Theater of the Russian Civil War.

== Background ==
At the end of 1918, the situation on the Eastern Front of the Russian Civil War was unclear. The forces of the Eastern White Movement tried to advance in two directions simultaneously: on the one hand towards the North-West to connect with the Northern Russia Front, on the other hand towards the South-West to connect with the Southern Russia Front and the troops of Anton Denikin and Pyotr Wrangel.
The Red Army considered the Southwestern advance of the White Army as the main threat, and concentrated its main forces in the Southern Ural region.

== Offensive of Siberian Army ==
On 29 November the 1st Middle Siberian Corps of the Siberian Army, led by Anatoly Pepelyayev, began its advance towards the North-West. On 21 December the Siberian Army captured Kungur, and on 24 December Perm. The Red Army lost 18,000 men, but the losses of the White Army were also great. Therefore, on 6 January 1919, White Russian Supreme Commander Alexander Kolchak ordered the 1st Middle Siberian Corps of the Siberian Army to hold its advance and defend.

== Counteroffensive of Red Army ==
On 19 January the Red Army began its counteroffensive to recapture Perm and Kungur. Up to 28 January the Red 2nd Army advanced 20–40 km, the Red 3rd Army only 10–20 km. The main objectives weren't achieved.

== See also ==
- Bibliography of the Russian Revolution and Civil War
- Outline of the Russian Revolution and Civil War
- Index of articles related to the Russian Revolution and Civil War
- The "Russian" Civil Wars, 1916–1926: Ten Years That Shook the World
- Russia in Flames: War, Revolution, Civil War, 1914–1921
- Russia in Revolution: An Empire in Crisis, 1890 to 1928
- Russia: Revolution and Civil War, 1917—1921
- The Russian Revolution: A New History
