= Siberian Cossacks =

Cossacks who settled in Siberia after its conquest by Russia

Siberian Cossacks were Cossacks who settled in the Siberian region of Russia from the end of the 16th century, following Yermak Timofeyevich's conquest of Siberia. In early periods, practically the whole Russian population in Siberia, especially the serving-men, were called Cossacks, but only in the loose sense of being neither land-owners nor peasants. Most of these people came from northwest Russia and had little connection to the Don Cossacks or Zaporozhian Cossacks.

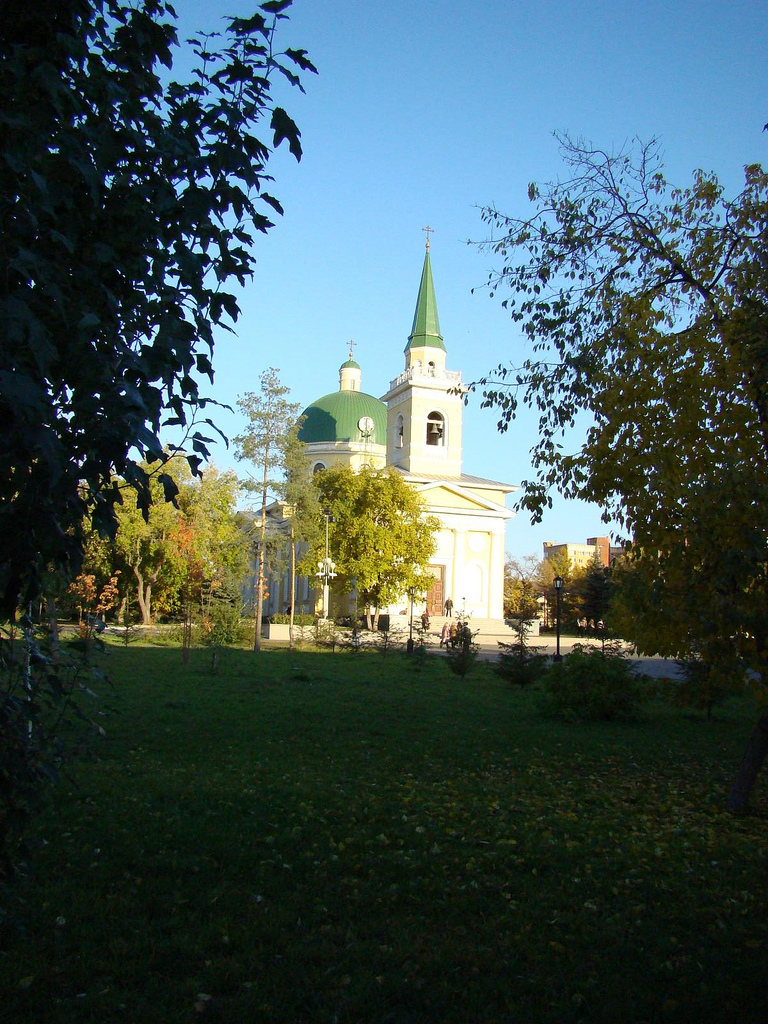
St. Nicholas Cossack Cathedral, the main church of the Siberian Cossack Host

== History ==
=== Tsarist period ===
Siberian Cossacks participated in military conflicts on behalf of the Tsars, from the 18th century until the revolution of 1917. In 1801 the Siberian Host provided 6,000 cossacks to garrison the settlements and frontier posts of the territory. By 1808 the Host had been organised into ten regiments of mounted cossacks and two companies of horse artillery.

During the Russo-Japanese War of 1905 the cossacks of the Siberian Host provided a significant proportion of the 207 squadrons of Russian cavalry involved. There was, however, criticism of their standard of horsemanship, and they were described as "infantry on horseback".

=== Post revolution ===
The Siberian Host was disbanded in 1919, following the Russian Revolution, and efforts were made by the new Soviet regime to eliminate the cultural and other distinctions of the cossacks at large. While some cossack regiments were reestablished in 1937, these did not include specifically Siberian units.

Currently a regiment of the Russian Ground Forces at Borzya in the Eastern Military District has the title "Cossack".

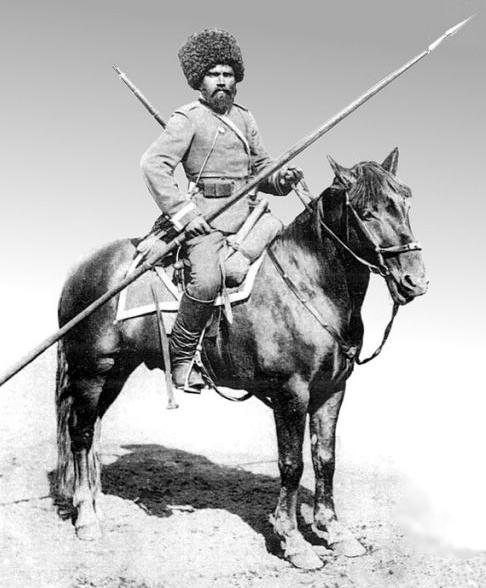
Siberian Cossack c. 1890s

== Distinctions ==
In 1802 the Siberian Host were authorized to wear uniforms, replacing their traditional dress. Initially these were based on the uniforms of the Don Cossacks, although after 1812 a more conventional lancer style dress was adopted. In practice the Siberian cossacks continued to provide their own clothing and equipment, meaning both were variegated.

By the 1880s, the distinguishing colour of the three regiments of the Siberian Cossack Host was red; worn on the cap bands, epaulettes and wide trouser stripes of a green uniform of the loose-fitting cut common to the Steppe Cossacks. High fleece hats were worn on occasion with red cloth tops. Modifications for officers in the early 1900s included black collars and pointed cuffs, edged with red piping. Epaulettes and shoulder strap braiding were silver. In 1909 khaki government-issue tunics and caps were provided for other ranks but the red facings and green breeches were retained.

The harshness of the northern climate influenced the appearance of the Siberian Cossack Host. The green tunics and khaki/grey overcoats were heavier than those of the southern hosts, while the sheep's-wool fleece headdress was taller and wider - producing a matted and tangled effect.

In recognition of their service during the French Invasion of Russia in 1812, the regiments of the Siberian Host were given the privilege of attaching colored pennants to the lances which remained their primary weapon until World War I.
