= Siberian Army =

Anti-Bolshevik army in the Russian Civil War

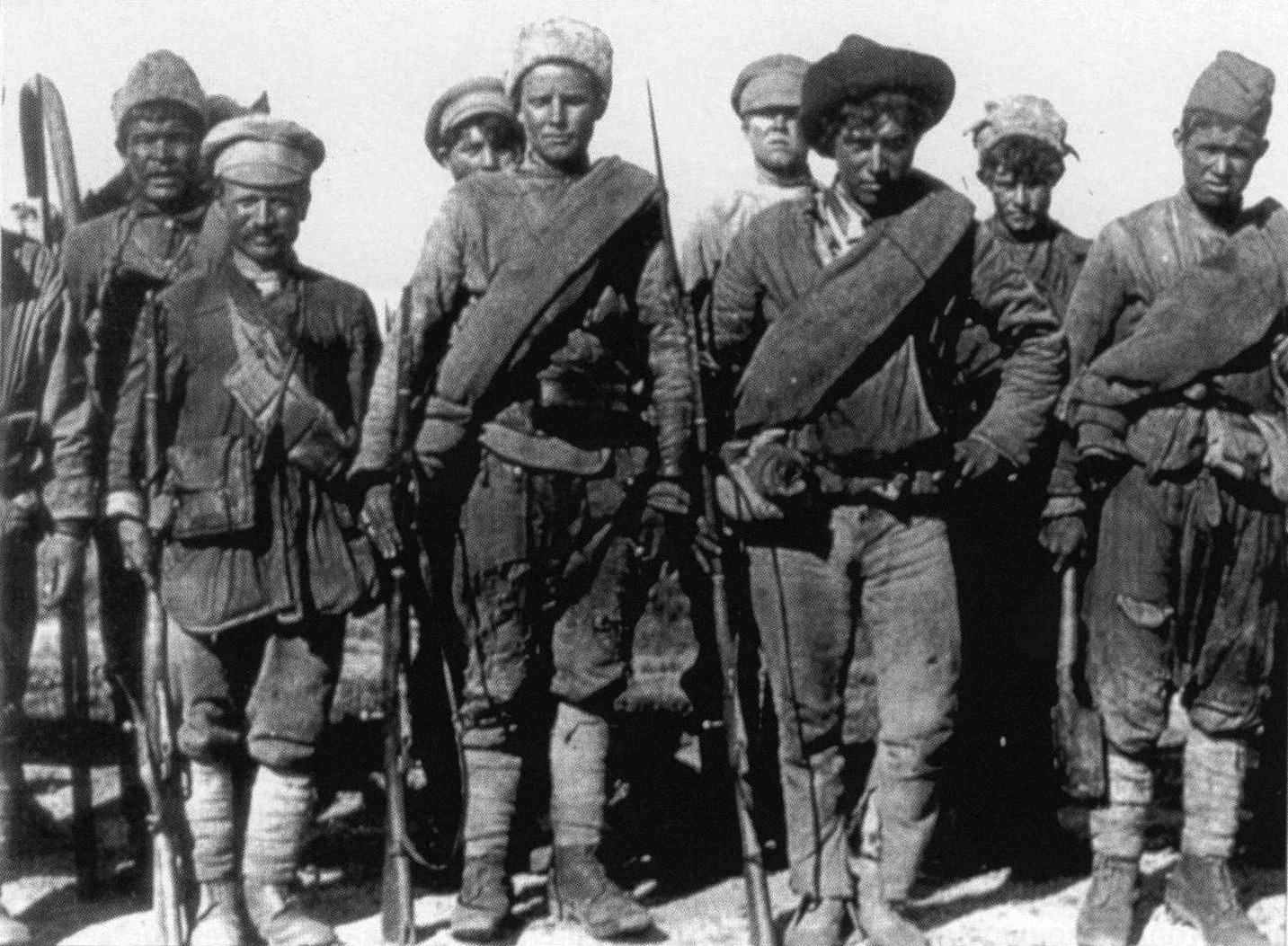
Soldiers of the Siberian Army in 1919.

The Siberian Army (Russian: Сибирская армия, romanized: Sibirskaya Armiya) was an anti-Bolshevik army during the Russian Civil War, which fought from June 1918 to July 1919 in Siberia–Ural Region.

== Background ==
One of the standards of the Siberian Army

After the Bolsheviks' seizure of power in Petrograd, the All-Siberian Extraordinary Congress of Delegates from Public Organizations was convened in Tomsk on December 7, 1917. The SR-dominated assembly refused to recognize Soviet authority or its decrees, and during its last session on December 15 called for the convocation of an "all-socialist" Siberian Regional Duma and appointed a Provisional Siberian Council, answerable to the Duma, that would "act as a government". The opening of the Duma was set for January 8, 1918.

As it happened, the Duma could not open on the date the congress had set for it due to lack of a quorum requiring that a minimum of one-third of the delegates, or 93, be present. Many of the delegates had already been arrested by local Bolshevik authorities; others had not been able to reach Tomsk.

Three weeks later, on the night of January 28–29, some 40 delegates finally succeeded in meeting. They expeditiously elected a government known as the Provisional Government of Autonomous Siberia (PGAS), under the chairmanship of a young Socialist-Revolutionary Pyotr Derber. Another member of SR Party—Col. Arkady Krakovetsky—became Minister of War; his task was to organize an anti-Bolshevik rebellion in Siberia. Krakovetsky appointed two representatives, stabskapitän Frizel in West-Siberian Military District and praporshchik Kalashnikov (both members of SR Party). However, there also were many independent underground military organizations with experienced officers as members. Hence, SR members quickly became driven into underground organizations. In western Siberia the main person became Col. Aleksey Grishin-Almazov, in Eastern Siberia Col. A. Ellerts-Usov. To coordinate the efforts they created the Central Staff in Novonikolaevsk; Grishin-Almazov became the chief of this staff.

== Creation of the Army ==
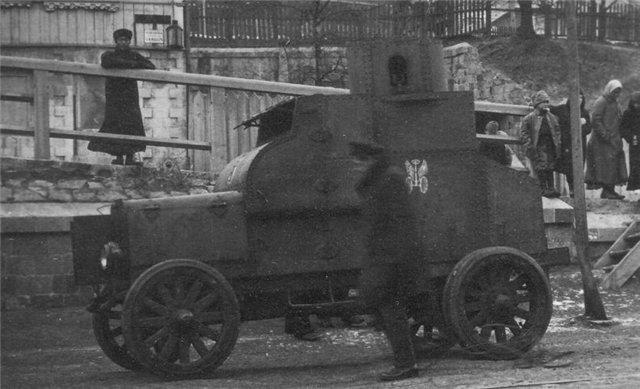
A Fiat-Omsky armored car used by the Siberian Army.

The Revolt of the Czechoslovak Legion in May 1918 radically changed the situation in Siberia. On May 25 legionaries captured Mariinsk, the next day Chelyabinsk and Novonikolaevsk. On May 28 A. Grishin-Almazov came to Novonikolaevsk and proclaimed himself commander of all troops in the Western Siberian Military District. At that time most members of PGAS (including Derber and Krakovetsky) were in Vladivostok; hence, it was necessary to create a structure of government without them. On May 30 a meeting took place in Novonikolaevsk, the so-called "Council of representatives of PGAS", which organized the provisional Western Siberian Commissariat.

On June 12, 1918, Grishin-Almazov ordered the renaming of the Staff of the Western Siberian Military District (located in Omsk) to the Staff of the Western Siberian Independent Army. Members of the Staff were officers of the old Russian Imperial Army, so there was no longer any influence of the deposed Socialist-Revolutionary Party.

On June 30, 1918, the Western Siberian Commissariat transferred its power to the Provisional Siberian Government (PSG), headed by Petr Vologodskii. Grishin-Almazov was appointed Minister of War, but he decided not to create a Ministry of War; he preferred to use the structure of the Staff of the Western Siberian Independent Army as a Ministry of War.

== Structure of the Army ==
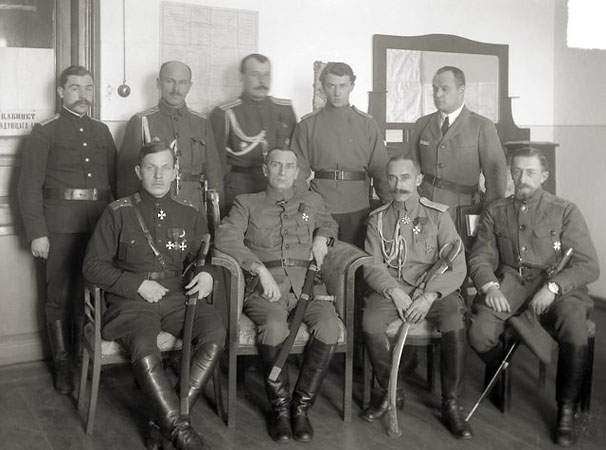
Headquarters of the Siberian Army, Yekaterinburg, February 1919. Seated from left to right : Radola Gajda, Admiral Kolchak, Boris Bogoslovskij, Sergey Domontovich.

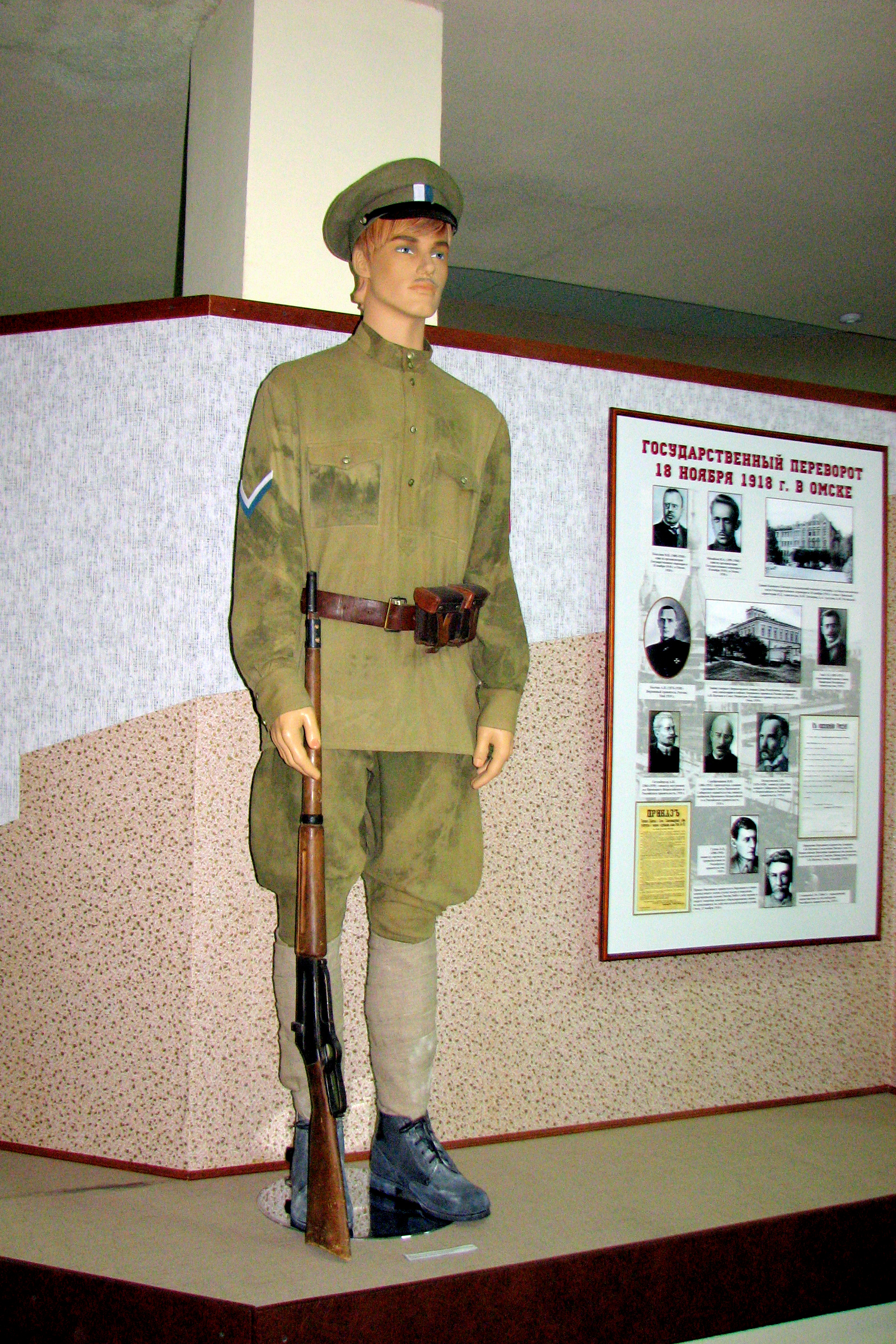
A Private of Siberian Army. Omsk local museum

On June 13, 1918, all troops under the command of Grichin-Almazov were concentrated into two corps:

- the Steppe Siberian Corps (with its headquarters in Omsk, commanded by Col. Pavel Ivanov-Rinov) and
- the Middle Siberian Corps (with its headquarters in Novonikolaevsk, commanded by Lt-Col. Anatoly Pepelyayev).

On July 11

- the Ural Corps (with its headquarters in Chelyabinsk, commanded by Col. Mikhail Hanzhin) was formed and organized.

By August 1918 the Siberian Army had three corps of 2 or 3 four-regimental divisions each (23,147 infantrymen, 14,888 cavalrymen and 22,224 unarmed volunteers).

At first the Siberian Army was a volunteer one, but it soon became obvious that in order to create a real army it was necessary to organize a program of conscription. The conscription began on August 25, 1918, and by October 1918 the Siberian Army had 10,754 officers and 173,843 soldiers.

It was divided eventually into five corps:

- 1st Middle Siberian Corps,
- 2nd Steppe Siberian Corps,
- 3rd Ural Corps,
- 4th Eastern Siberian Corps (with its headquarters in Irkutsk, commanded by Major-Col. Alexander Ellerz-Usov),
- 5th Pri-Amur Corps (with its headquarters in Khabarovsk, commanded by Major-Col. Grigory Semyonov).

It was clearly apparent that by the summer of 1918 the main military force in the eastern part of Russia was the Czechoslovak Legion. During the meeting in Chelyabinsk, which took place on July 13, 1918, it was decided that before the appointment of the Chief of all allied forces in Russia the Siberian troops on the front line would be placed under the command of the head of the Czechoslovak Legion, Maj. Gen. Vladimir Shokorov (he was an officer in the Russian Army during the First World War). At the end of summer, when the Siberian Army became more powerful and Shokorov was replaced by Jan Syrový as the head of the Czechoslovak Legion, tensions began to develop between the Russians and the Czechoslovaks.

== Reorganization ==
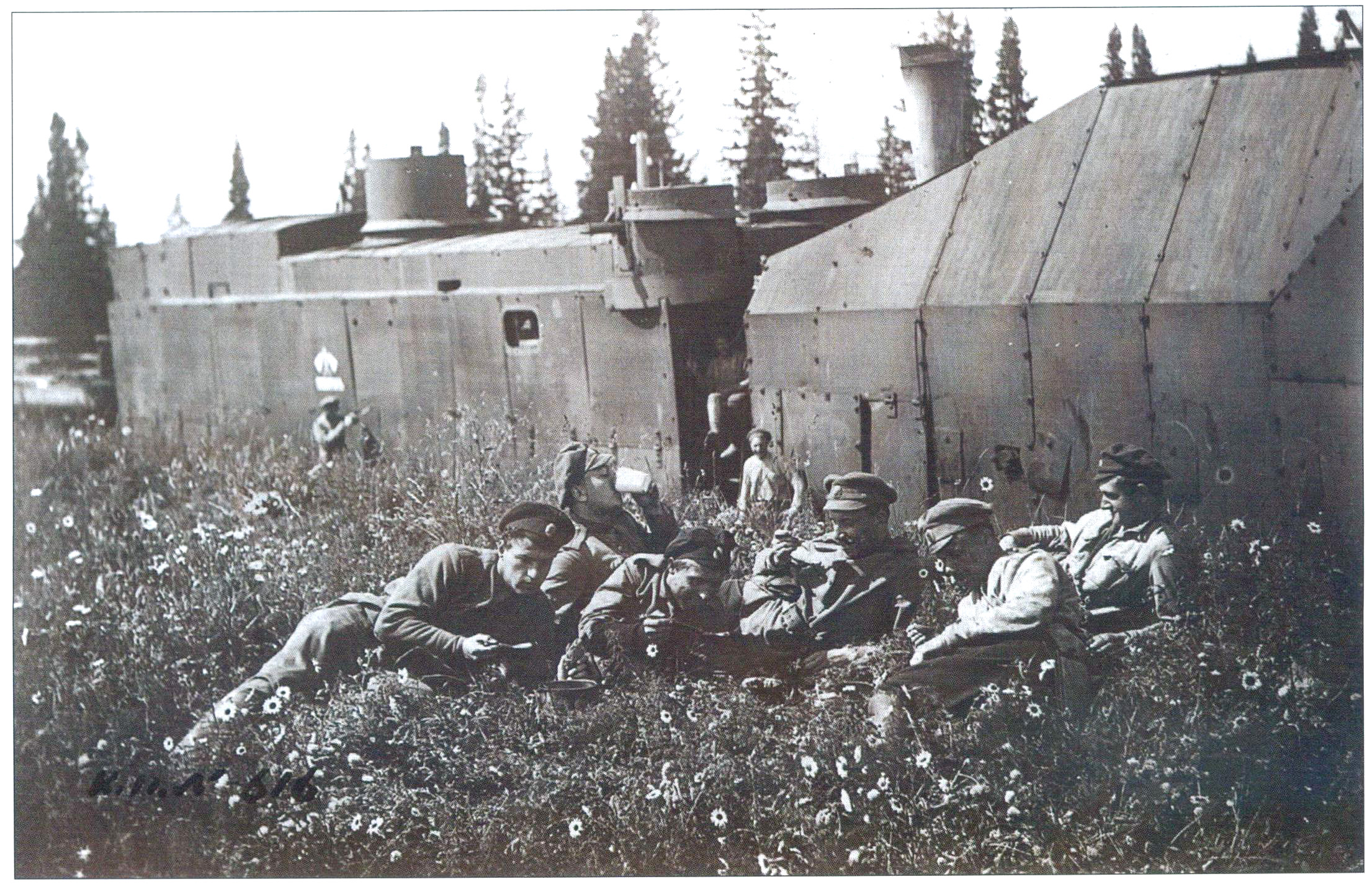
The crew of a Siberian armored train relax during a stop in the summer of 1919. Propaganda photo of Kolchak's army

In September 1918, during the State Conference in Ufa, it was decided that the Provisional Government of Autonomous Siberia and the Committee of Members of the Constituent Assembly should form a united Provisional All-Russian Government with Nikolai Avksentiev as its head. Lt. Gen. Vasily Boldyrev replaced Jan Syrový as head of all allied forces in Russia. Pavel Ivanov-Rinov from the Siberian Army became the new Minister of War and new head of the Siberian Army. Boldyrev reorganized all anti-Bolshevik forces in Eastern Russia into three fronts:

- Western Front,
- South-Western Front
- Siberian Front.

Ivanov-Rinov became commander-in-chief of the entire Siberian Front.

After a military coup d'état in November 1918, when Adm. Alexander Kolchak proclaimed himself the Supreme Ruler of Russia, Boldyrev was forced to emigrate. In December 1918 Kolchak dissolved the old Siberian Army and created a new one on the base of the Ekaterinburg Group (included the 1st and 3rd Corps of the Siberian Army and some other troops) with Radola Gajda as its commander. Three other independent forces were created.

- Western Army, from the Samara and Kamskaya group of troops, including the 3rd and 6th Ural Corps, led by Gen. Mikhail Hanzhin
- Orenburg Independent Army, on the base of the South-Western Front troops, under the command of General Alexander Dutov
- 2nd Steppe Siberian Corps, reorganized from the Siberian Front, with Gen. Brzhezovsky as its commander.

In July 1919, after the Spring Offensive of the Russian Army and the Counteroffensive of the Eastern Front, the Siberian Army, now under command of Mikhail Diterikhs, was divided into the

- 1st Army (Tyumen direction under command of Anatoly Pepelyayev)
- 2nd Army (Kurgan direction under command of Konstantin Akintievskij).

Together with the 3d Army of Konstantin Sakharov, they formed an Eastern Front of the White Movement. After several crushing defeats at the hands of the resurgent Red Army, the Eastern front largely collapsed, and dissolved by November 1919. The last troops of the Siberian Army retreated to the Transbaikal Region and were incorporated into the Far East Army.

== Commanders ==
- Aleksei Grishin-Almazov (June–September 1918)
- Pavel Ivanov-Rinov (September–December 1918)
- Radola Gajda (January–July 1919)
- Mikhail Diterikhs (July–November 1919)

== Sources ==
- Н.Е.Какурин, И.И.Вацетис "Гражданская война. 1918–1921" (N.E.Kakurin, I.I.Vacietis "Civil War. 1918–1921") – Sankt-Peterburg, "Polygon" Publishing House, 2002. ISBN 5-89173-150-9
