= Anatoly Pepelyayev =

Russian general (1891-1938)

- Анатолий Пепеляев
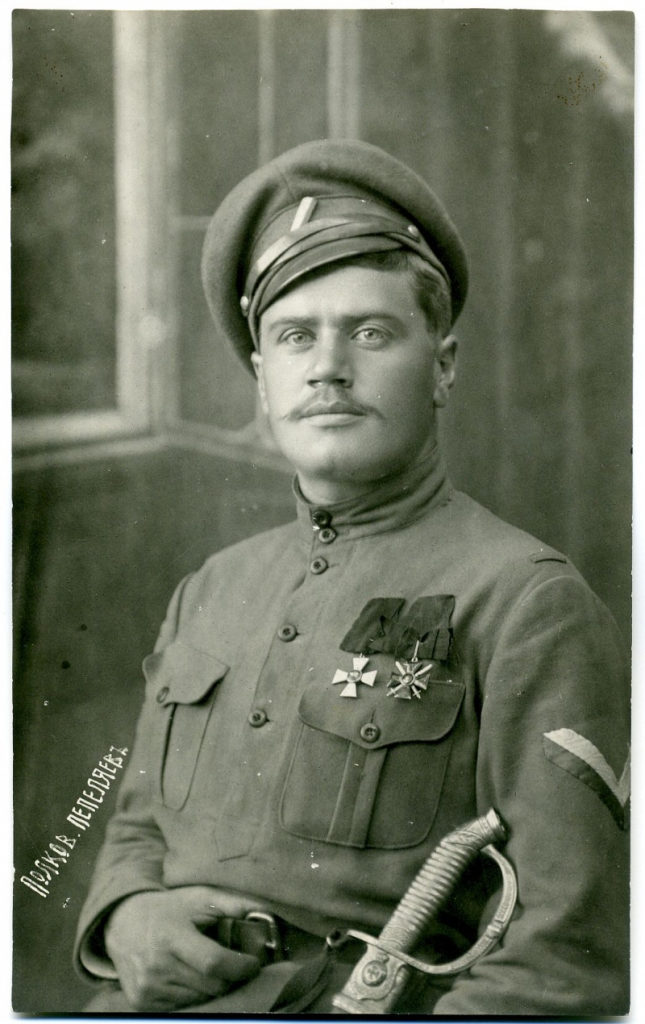
- Pepelyayev in 1918

De facto Leader of the Provisional Priamurye Government
- In office October 1922–16 June 1923
- Preceded by: Mikhail Diterikhs
- Succeeded by: Government collapse

Personal details
- Born: 15 July [O.S. 3 July] 1891 Tomsk, Russian Empire
- Died: 14 January 1938 (aged 46) Novosibirsk, Russian SFSR, Soviet Union
- Education: Omsk Cadet Military Corps

Military service
- Allegiance: Russian Empire; Siberian Republic; Russian State
- Branch/service: Cavalry; White Army
- Years of service: 1902–1923
- Rank: Lieutenant colonel Lieutenant general (Note: Rank held during the Russian Civil War.)
- Battles/wars: World War I Russian Civil War

Anatoly Nikolayevich Pepelyayev (Russian: Анатолий Николаевич Пепеляев; 15 July [O.S. 3 July] 1891, in Tomsk – 14 January 1938) was a White Russian general who led the Siberian armies of Admiral Kolchak during the Russian Civil War. His elder brother Viktor Pepelyayev served as prime minister in Kolchak's government.

== Early life and career ==
Anatoly Pepelyayev was brought up "in the family of a military man." who was a Lieutenant General in the Imperial Russian Army, by the name of Nikolai Mikhailovich Pepelyayev (05/06/1858-11/20/1916.) and to the daughter merchant by the name of Claudia Nekrasova. He had a total 8 siblings, two of which were his sisters, and the remainder were his brothers.

During his youth, one of his brothers, one Pyotr Nikolaevich, passed away.

Sometime in 1912, Pepelyayev married a woman by the name of Nina Ivanovna Gavronskaya (Note: Sources). Born in Nizhneudinsk in 1893, Nina Gavronskaya and Anatoly Pepelyayev had two children, Vsevolod Anatolievich Pepelyaev in 1913 (Note: Sources), and Lavr Anatolievich Pepelyaev in 1922. Nina Gavronskaya died in 1979.

== First World War and the Trans-Siberian march ==
A graduate of the Omsk Cadets Corps (Graduated in 1908, entered 1902.), followed by his graduation from the Pavlovsk Military School (Graduated in 1910, having joined the same year he graduated the Omsk Cadets Corps.), Pepelyayev took part in World War I at the rank of Lieutenant and distinguished himself at the battles of Przasnysz and Soldau. A group composed of 4 squadrons of mounted scouts from the 42nd Regiment, 11th Siberian Rifle Division, was led by Pepelyaev in mid-September 1915. By the Russian Revolution, he was a lieutenant colonel, and took the helm of the White movement in his native Siberian city of Tomsk, raising the 1st Middle Siberian Corps and joining forces with the White Czechs.

In the summer of 1918 Pepelyayev's corps was involved in a remarkable expedition to the east along the Trans-Siberian Railway. It was as a consequence of this expedition that the Whites managed to bring Siberia under their direct control. On 18 June Pepelyayev entered Krasnoyarsk; on 26 August he advanced as far east as Chita. Having crossed Transbaikalia, Pepelyayev's forces linked up with the Amur Cossacks of Grigory Semyonov in early September.

== Service under Kolchak ==
In December, Pepelyayev's forces resumed their high tempo advance, this time to the west. On 16 December 1918, Pepelyaev signed Order No. 049, directing an attack on Perm. His greatest victory was the Capture of Perm, where some roughly 20,000~ Red Army soldiers were taken prisoner on 25 December 1918 (Note: Often listed as "December 24, 1918, though it is most likely the early morning hours of the 25, or the late night of the 24.) following its abandonment." By the evening of the aforementioned 25 December, the city was under White Army control. These Bolsheviks were reportedly released back to their homes on Pepelyayev's personal orders. For this victory, he was promoted to the rank of Lieutenant General, nicknamed "Siberian Suvorov" (because his accomplishment coincidentally happened just after the 128th anniversary of the capture of the fortress of Izmail by Alexander Suvorov), and, for preliminary accomplishments and this, awarded the Order of St. George of the 3rd degree. Further advances on Vyatka were impeded by heavy frost. As the spring rasputitsa arrived, Pepelyayev's position deteriorated. His armies had outrun their supply lines and were exhausted from many months of incessant warfare, while the Red Army was pouring newly raised troops into the area.

Pepelyayev's taking of Glazov on 2 June 1919 was his last success. During the following months, his First Siberian Army suffered a series of setbacks and fell back on Tobolsk, where they were forced to make a last stand against the Bolsheviks. By the end of the year, the White Army had collapsed into a panic and abandoned Omsk, followed by Tomsk.

Pepelyayev's conflict with Kolchak came to a head in mid-December 1919 when he issued threats to arrest the White admiral. They were reconciled by Viktor Pepelyayev before Anatoly was disabled by typhus and transferred for convalescence to Harbin. The remains of his army joined that of Vladimir Kappel and crossed the frozen Lake Baikal during the Great Siberian Ice March.

== "Pepelyayevshchina" ==
During his stint in Harbin, the former general was employed in menial jobs, including those of carpenter and taxi driver. Still, he harboured the intention of wresting Siberia from the Bolsheviks. On 31 August 1922 Pepelyayev and 553-strong volunteer "druzhina" embarked on the last major operation of the Civil War. They sailed into the Sea of Okhotsk and disembarked at the port of Okhotsk, aiming to penetrate westward into the rugged mountainous country.

In September Pepelyayev sailed up the Okhota River into Siberia, with his eyes set on Yakutsk. His troops swarmed over Yakutia, but were contained by Ivan Strod's Bolsheviks. Numerically weaker, they were defeated by sheer weight of numbers. After abandoning the key settlement of Amga, Pepelyayev pressed on towards the Pacific in the hope of making a crossing to Sakhalin. This final campaign saw him defeated near Okhotsk on 1–2 May. Pepelyayev surrendered to the Bolsheviks after the siege of the seaside village of Ayan on 17 June 1923. This was the last siege of the Russian Civil War.

== Imprisonment and death ==
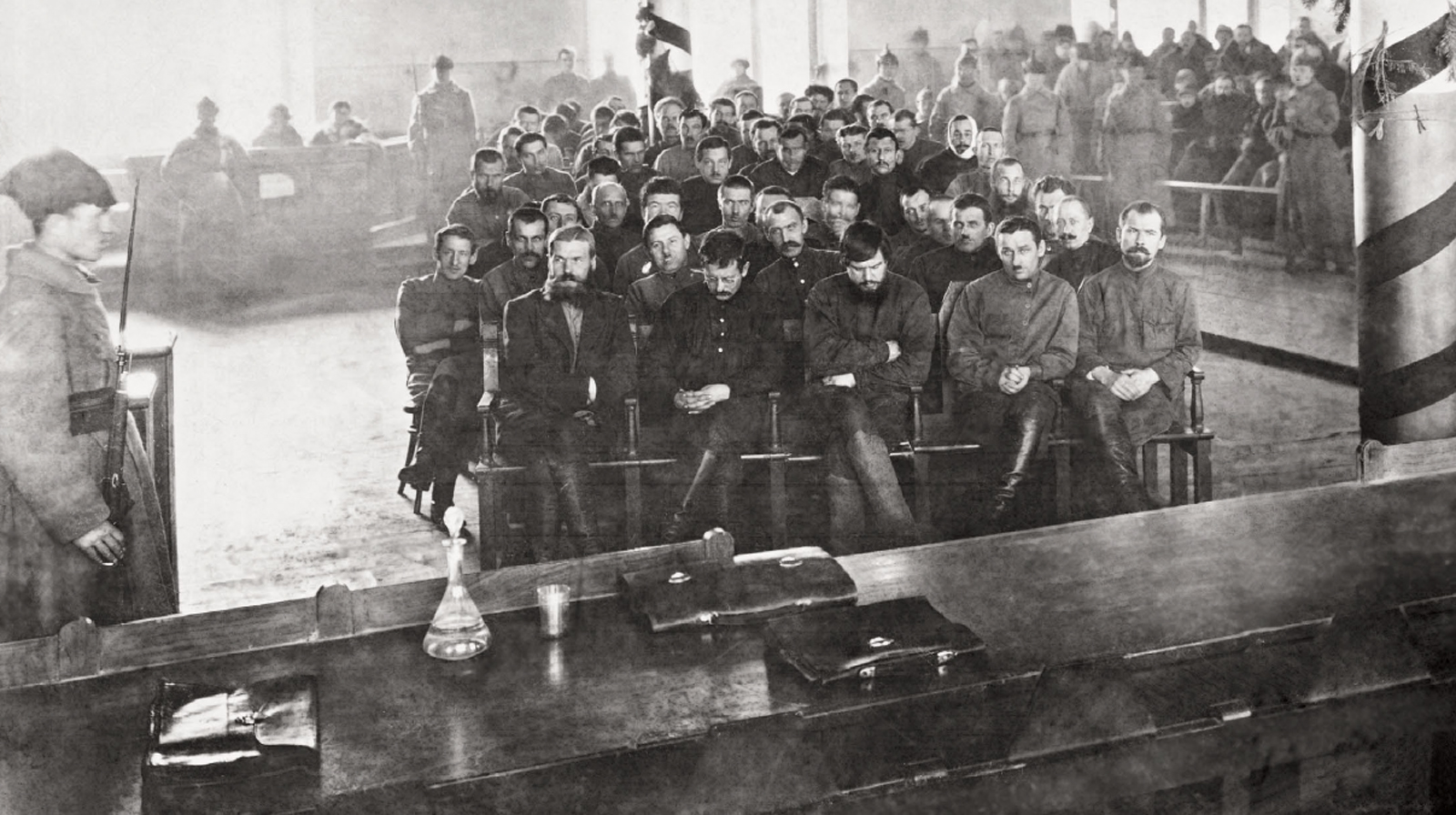
Pepelyayev (center in the first row) during the trial in Chita

Lieutenant General Pepelyayev was tried by the Vladivostok military tribunal and sentenced to execution by firing squad. After he asked Mikhail Kalinin for pardon, the sentence was commuted to ten years in prison. He served this term in the Yaroslavl prison, then in Butyrki. Pepelyayev was finally set at liberty on 6 June 1936 and was employed as a carpenter in Voronezh. In August 1937, during The Great Purge, he was again arrested, taken to Novosibirsk, tried on charges of having created a counter-revolutionary organization, sentenced to death on 7 December and executed on 14 January 1938 as an 'enemy of the people'. His Civil War rival Ivan Strod also perished in the Great Purge. Pepelyayev was posthumously cleared of these charges and completely rehabilitated on 20 October 1989.

== Honours and awards ==
- Order of St. Anna, 4th class with the inscription "For Bravery", 3rd class and 2nd class
- Order of St. Stanislaus, 3rd and 2nd classes
- Order of St. Vladimir, 4th class, with swords and bow
- Order of St. George, 4th class (27 January 1917)
- Gold Sword for Bravery (27 September 1916)

== In popular culture ==
Pepelyayev is a supporting character in the novel 1936, written by Sean League. It offers a fictional explanation for his release from prison in 1936 and re-arrest and execution a year later.

== Bibliography ==
- Последние бои на Дальнем Востоке. М., Центрполиграф (Recent fighting in the Far East. M. Tsentrpoligraf), 2005.
- Александр Петрушин. Омск, Аян, Лубянка... Три жизни генерала Пепеляева. // «Родина», 1996 No. 9. (Alexander Petrushin. Omsk, Ayan, Lubyanka ... Three Lives General Pepelyaev. / / "Homeland", 1996 number 9)
- Клипель В. И. Аргонавты снегов. О неудавшемся походе генерала А. Пепеляева. (Klipel VI Argonauts snow. On the failed campaign of General A. Pepelyaev) Домен припаркован в Timeweb
- Пепеляевщина. 6 сентября 1922 — 17 июня 1923 гг. (Pepelyaevschina. 6 September 1922 – 17 June 1923) Илин № 1 1998
- Грачев Г. П. Якутский поход генерала Пепеляева (под ред. П. К. Конкина) (Grachev GP Yakut hike General Pepelyaev (ed. Konkin PK)) Илин № 6 '2005
