= Mikhail Lashevich =

Soviet military and party leader

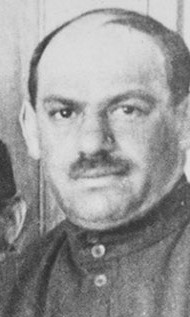
- Lashevich in 1919
- Born: Mikhail Mikhailovich Lashevich; 1884; Odessa, Kherson Governorate, Russian Empire (now Ukraine)
- Died: 31 August 1928 (aged 43–44); Harbin, Heilongjiang, Republic of China (now China)
- Military career
- Allegiance: Russian Empire (1915–1917); Russian SFSR (1917–1922); USSR (1922–1928)
- Branch: Red Army
- Service years: 1915–1928
- Commands: Siberian Military District
- Conflicts: World War I Russian Civil War
- Awards: Order of the Red Banner (2)
- Other work: Politician

Mikhail Mikhailovich Lashevich (Russian: Михаил Михайлович Лашевич; 1884 – 30 August 1928), also known under the name Gaskovich, was a Soviet military and party leader.

== Biography ==
Lashevich was born as Moisey Gaskovich into a Jewish merchant family in Odessa. He joined the Russian Social Democratic Labour Party in 1901 and after the split of 1903 adhered with the Bolshevik faction. He was conscripted into the Imperial Russian Army during the First World War and was twice wounded. After the February Revolution of 1917, he went to St. Petersburg, where he opposed the decision of Lenin to launch the Bolshevik revolution.

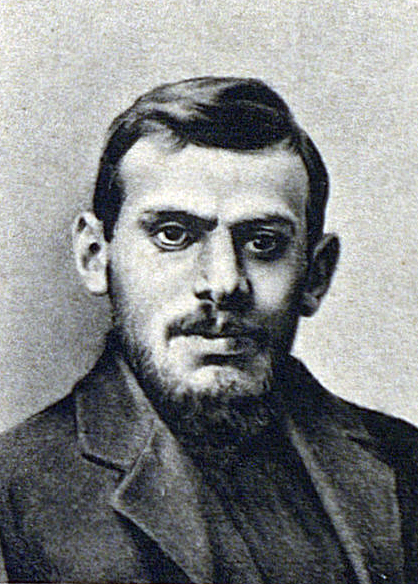
Lashevich in 1917

After the October Revolution, however, he held various higher military, party and governmental posts. As a senior commissar in the Red Army he took part in the defeat of Yudenich, Denikin and Kolchak. He was appointed with Kliment Voroshilov to the Revolutionary Military Council in 1923, and the same year was elected to the Party's Central Committee. Lashevich was Deputy Commissar for War in 1925–26.

Once Joseph Stalin started to rise to power, Lashevich sided with Leon Trotsky. As a result, he was removed from central posts and sent to Harbin to serve as acting manager of the Chinese Eastern Railway on 14 April 1926. In 1927, at the 15th Congress of the VKP(b), he was expelled from the Party, together with other Trotskyists. In 1928, after he recanted his opposition, his party membership was restored.

In August 1928, he was reported to have been arrested by Chinese authorities in connection with the Barga uprising at Hulunbuir, which was led by the Inner Mongolian politician Merse.

According to official sources, Lashevich died from gangrene in Harbin on 30 August 1928. Some other sources claim that he was either killed in a car accident or had committed suicide. His funeral took place in Leningrad.

He is remembered by a plaque at the Monument to the Fighters of the Revolution on the Field of Mars in St Petersburg.
