= 33rd Kuban Rifle Division =

- Active: March 1919 – September 1920
- Country: Russian Soviet Federated Socialist Republic
- Branch: Red Army
- Type: Infantry
- Engagements: Russian Civil War; Polish–Soviet War

Commanders
- Notable commanders: Mikhail Lewandowski; Oscar Stigga

The 33rd Kuban Rifle Division was an infantry division of the Red Army during the Russian Civil War and the Polish–Soviet War. The division was first formed as the 33rd Rifle Division in March 1919 on the Southern Front and became the 33rd Kuban Rifle Division in December 1919. From June 1920 the division fought in the Polish–Soviet War. In September 1920, the units from the 33rd and other divisions became part of the new Kuban Cavalry Division, which soon became the 5th Kuban Cavalry Division.

== History ==
=== Astrakhan, Donbas battles, and attack on Moscow ===
Denikin's Moscow Offensive, 8th Army positions are in the center near Voronezh

The division was formed by an order of the 11th Army dated 20 March 1919 from units of the 1st Rifle Division of the 12th Army, which had been formed in October 1918 as the Astrakhan Rifle Division. The division participated in the defense of Astrakhan until May 1919. The 33rd became part of the 11th Army upon its formation and was commanded by Pavel Kuzmich Marmuzov. In May, Mikhail Lewandowski took command of the division. Between May and June, the division fought in defensive battles for control of the Donbas. In June, the division became part of the 8th Army. After the Donbas fighting, White Army commander Anton Denikin ordered an attack on Moscow in the Moscow Directive. Initially successful, the White offensive forced the 8th Army, including the 33rd, and other Red units to retreat, but was stopped by Bolshevik resistance by the beginning of August.

=== August Offensive and Voronezh-Kastornensk Offensive ===
The 33rd Division fought in the subsequent Red August Offensive between 14 August and 12 September. During the offensive, the 33rd participated in battles in the area of Chertkovo, Kantemirovka, and Pavlovsk. The August Offensive failed to halt the Volunteer Army's advance, and the Don Army captured Voronezh. To halt the Don Army, the 8th Army and other units launched the Voronezh-Kastornensk Offensive. During the offensive, which resulted in the defeat of the Don Army, the 33rd captured the key rail station of Liski and fought in the advance of the 8th Army to the Don.

=== Operations in the Donbas ===
Between 20 November and 8 December, the 33rd fought in the Khopyor-Don Operation, during which it participated in the attack on Rossosh. From 24 November to 12 December, the division as part of 8th Army fought in the Kharkov Operation, during which the 33rd advanced on Starobilsk and captured Ostrogozhsk and Shebekino. On 2 December, the division was redesignated as the 33rd Kuban Rifle Division. On 18 December, the Donbas Offensive, began, with the objective of retaking the Donbas. During the offensive, the 33rd Division fought in the attack from the Bilolutsk area along the Aidar River, the recapture of Lugansk, the advance on the Petropavlovka-Ivanovka area, and the capture of Kartushino.

=== North Caucasus Advance ===
The Donbas Offensive succeeded, and the advance of the 8th Army continued in the Rostov-Novocherkassk Operation from 3 to 10 January 1920. The 33rd attacked from the Diakovo area towards Rostov and conducted a meeting engagement with elements of the White Consolidated Cavalry Corps in the area of Generalsky Most, then participated in the capture of Rostov on 7 January. Between 17 January and 6 February, the division fought in the Don–Manych Operation, fighting in the area of Starocherkasskaya, Aksayskaya, Manychskaya, and Zlodeiskaya. The division then fought in the Tikhoretsk Operation from 14 February to 2 March, during which a White counterattack briefly recaptured Rostov, which was retaken by the 8th Army on 23 February. In March, the division became part of the 9th Army. Lewandowski was promoted to command the 9th Army, and division commissar Oscar Stigga took command. From 3 to 27 March, the division fought in the Kuban-Novorossiysk Offensive, during which it advanced towards Timagievskaya, Medvedovskaya, and Abinsk. The 33rd fought in the capture of Novorossiysk, which resulted in the evacuation of the remnants of the Don Army and the Volunteer Army. During March and April, the division participated in mopping-up operations against remaining scattered White troops in the Maykop area, and the Stanitsas of Kamennomostnaya and Andryukovskaya, among others. During April and May, the division was part of the 10th Army. The division then became part of the 9th Kuban Army for the remainder of May.

=== Polish-Soviet War ===
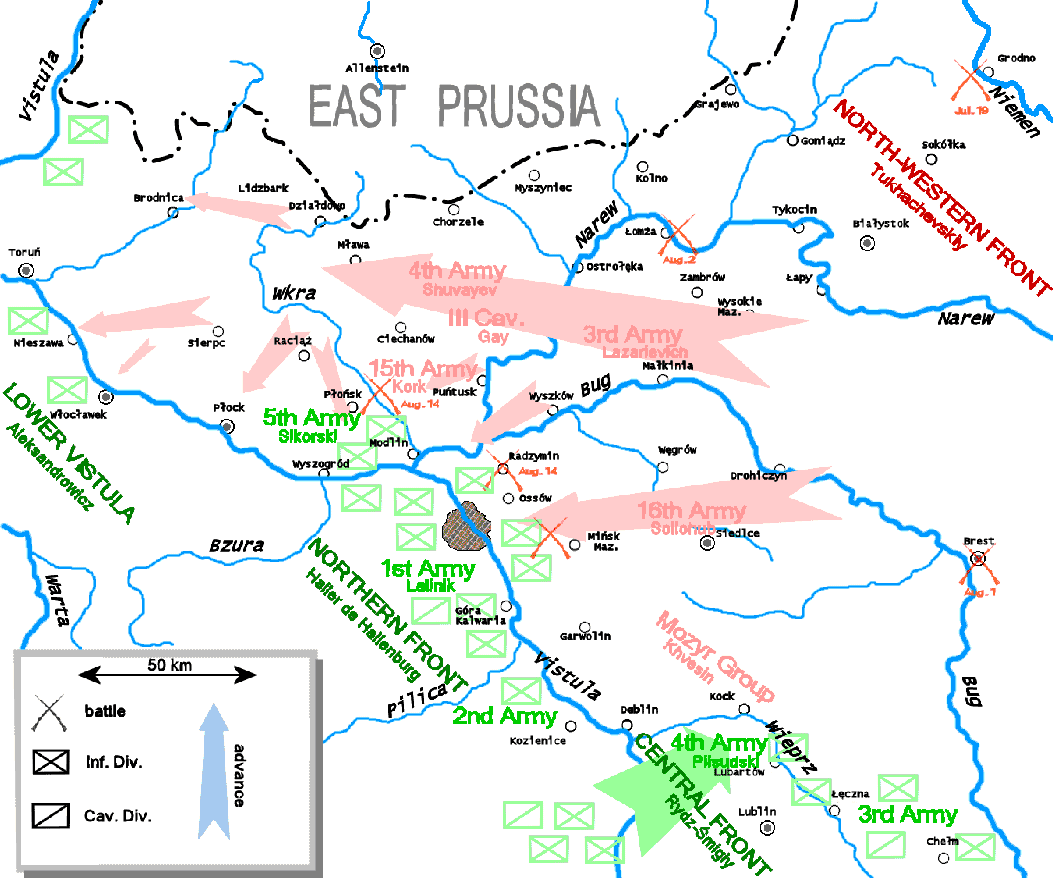
Battle of Warsaw before the Polish counterattack, 15th Army positions are northwest of the city

In June 1920, the division was transferred to become part of August Kork's 15th Army, fighting in the Polish-Soviet War. Between 4 and 23 July, the division fought in the July Offensive, during which it fought in the offensive on Grodno, fighting near Glubokoye and Molodechno, and the crossing of the Neman. From 23 July to 25 August, the division fought in the Battle of Warsaw, during which it participated in battles on the Narew, and the advance on Wyszków and Płońsk. On 15 August, a Polish cavalry raid led by Aleksander Karnicki cut the communications between the 15th Army and the neighboring 4th Army, and captured the town of Ciechanów, the 4th Army's headquarters. Kork sent in the 33rd, in reserve at the time, and it reoccupied Ciechanów after the Polish withdrew. On the next day, the Polish troops launched an unsuccessful counterattack, and the 33rd, reinforced by two Cossack regiments, attacked and destroyed a battalion of the Polish 18th Infantry Division.

The Polish counterattack that began on 16 August finally broke through the Soviet lines and forced the division, along with the rest of the 15th Army, into a disorganized retreat. Around seven eighths of the Kuban Division retreated into East Prussia, where it was interned alongside much of the 15th Army. Division commander Stigga spent two months in internment, and was replaced in command by N.A. Shabanov. The 33rd was withdrawn back to Lida for reorganization in early September. By an order of the 15th Army dated 4 September 1920, the cavalry brigades of the 33rd and other divisions were used to form the new Kuban Cavalry Division, which soon became the 5th Kuban Cavalry Division. On 26 September remnants of the division still at Lida were overrun by the Polish advance, during the Battle of the Niemen River.

== Commanders ==
The following officers commanded the 33rd Division.

- Pavel Kuzmich Marmuzov (March–May 1919)
- Mikhail Lewandowski (May 1919 – March 1920)
- Oscar Stigga (March–September 1920)
