= List of Don Republic units in the Russian Civil War =

Flag of Don Republic during the Civil War

Don Republic provided the following units to the Don Army and Volunteer Army during the Russian Civil War. After the revolution and the collapse of the front most Don officers and Cossack's returned to their lands of the Don. Most of the Cossacks were outspoken opponents of the Bolsheviks. At the first opportunity, they formed a partisan detachment. In its first stages, the Don Army was under the leadership of the Don Ataman Full General Alexey Kaledin who led the Don Cossack Whites before he died on January 29, 1918, at Novocherkassk

== First Don Army ==
=== Cavalry ===
- 1st Cossack Volunteer Cavalry Regiment of Alexei V. Kravtzov
- 2nd Cossack Volunteer Cavalry Regiment of Petr H. Popov (ru:Попов, Пётр Харитонович)
- 3rd Cossack Volunteer Cavalry Regiment of Alexander P. Fitzhelaurov (ru:Фицхелауров, Александр Петрович)
- 4th Cossack Volunteer Cavalry Regiment of Alexander V. Golubintzev
- Colonel Tchernetzov's Partisan Company of Vasily Tchernetzov

== 2nd stage – After reorganization of the Don Army in August 1919 under command of Generals Krasnov and Bogaewsky ==
=== 1st Don Army Corps ===
==== Infantry ====
- 6th Don Division (6-я Донская пластунская дивизия)
- 3rd Don Brigade (3-я Донская пластунская бригада)
- 4th Don Brigade (4-я Донская пластунская бригада)

==== Cavalry ====
- 10th Don Cavalry Brigade
- 14th Don Cavalry Brigade

=== 4th Independent Don Army Corps ===
==== Cavalry ====
- 9th Don Cavalry Division
- 10rd Don Cavalry Division
- 9th Don Cavalry Brigade
- 13th Don Cavalry Brigade
