= Vyoshenskaya Uprising =

- Part of the Southern Front of the Russian Civil War
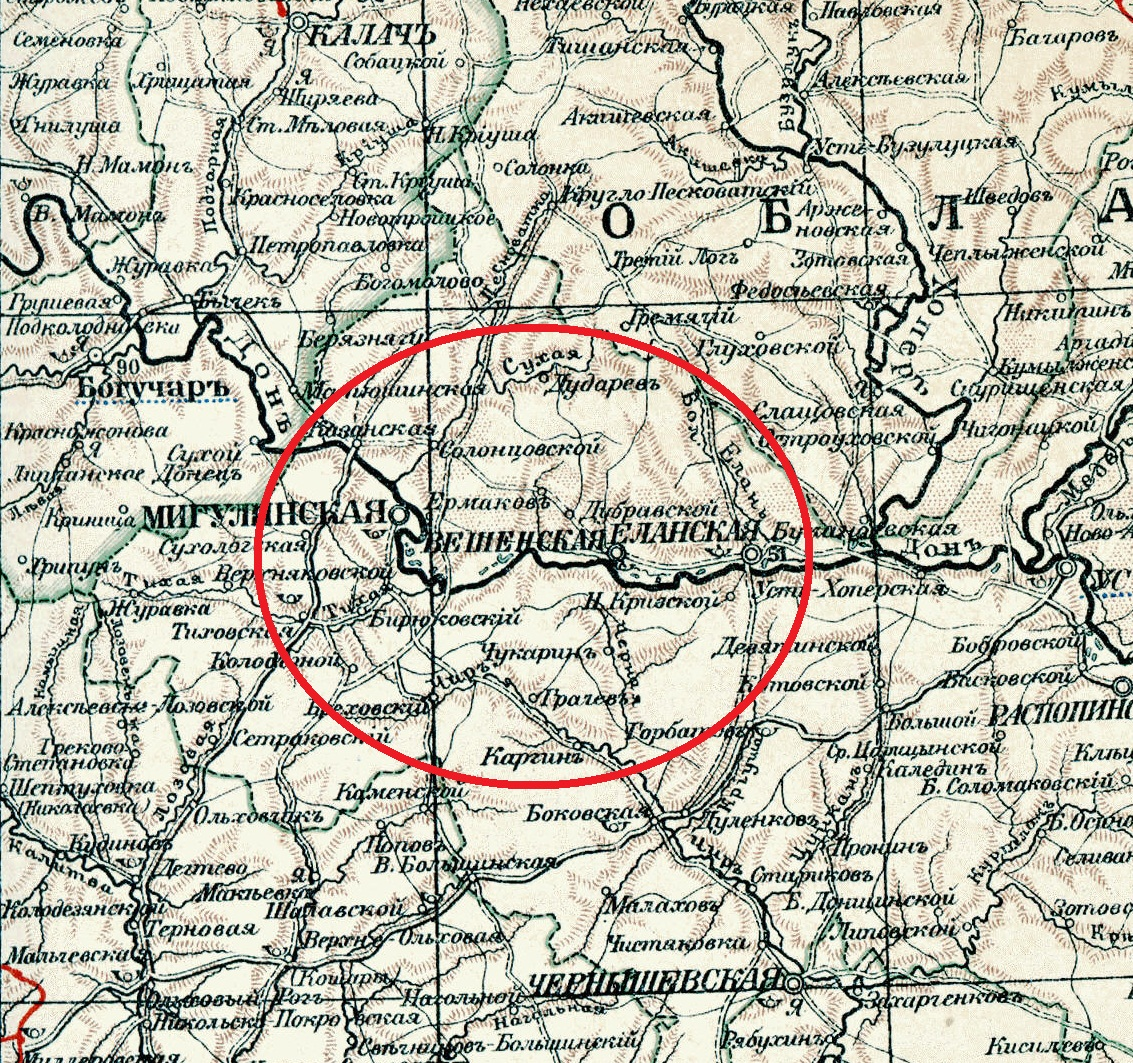
- Map
Date	March 11 – June 8, 1919
Location	Rostov Oblast around Vyoshenskaya
Result	Insurgent victory

Belligerents
Upper Don Cossacks; Don Army	(Russian Soviet Federative Socialist Republic) Southern Front (Russian Soviet Federative Socialist Republic) 8th Army (RSFSR) (Russian Soviet Federative Socialist Republic) 9th Army (RSFSR)

Commanders and leaders
Pavel Kudinov; Vladimir Sidorin	(Russian Soviet Federative Socialist Republic) Pavel Knyagnitsky (Russian Soviet Federative Socialist Republic) Tichon Hvesin

Strength
est. 30,000	14,000

Casualties and losses
Unknown	Unknown

The Vyoshenskaya Uprising (or Upper Don rebellion) (March 11 - June 8, 1919) was an uprising of the Don Cossacks during the Russian Civil War led by Pavel Kudinov against the Bolsheviks, which had occupied the Upper Don district in January–March 1919. The uprising was centered around the village of Vyoshenskaya.

== Uprising ==
At the end of 1918 and beginning of 1919 the Tsaritsyn Front of the Don Army suffered a serious defeat against the Bolsheviks in the Voronezh–Povorino Operation. The Don Army retreated south, but many Upper-Don Cossacks went home, hoping for some peace settlement with the Red Army. But the Red Army ordered the Cossacks to surrender all weapons within 24 hours under the threat of execution. They also decided to confiscate the property from the "rich and bourgeois" and any money except Soviet money was banned.

The district was flooded with Red units passing south to the front, leading to requisitioning of bread, horses and ordinary robbery. The Red tribunals began to draw up execution lists. By the beginning of the uprising, up to 300 Cossacks had been shot, and rumors of executions lists of hundreds of Cossacks from every village, completely upset the Upper Don Cossacks.

This led to a spontaneous uprising in the whole district, of which Pavel Kudinov became the leader.
To suppress the uprising, the Red Army was forced to divert 14,000 soldiers from the 8th and 9th armies of the Southern Front.
Despite the massive repression, the Don Cossacks managed, with the support of parts of the Don Army, to contain the onslaught of the expeditionary forces.

The insurgents, whose strength was estimated at 30,000, tied down roughly the same number of Soviet troops, diverting them from checking the advance of the Don Army.

Between May 28-June 2, the Don Army command took to the offensive along the entire front. Having seized the initiative, the units of the Don Army occupied Millerovo in May, Lugansk on June 1 and, interacting with units of the Volunteer Army, drove the 8th Red Army to the north in the direction of Voronezh, and the 9th Red Army to the northeast in the direction of Balashov.

The insurgents united with the Don Army at Vyoshenskaya and by the end of June the Don Host Oblast had been cleared of Soviet forces.
