= Rostov–Novocherkassk Operation =

- Part of the Southern Front of the Russian Civil War
- Don Area
Date	January 6–10, 1920
Location	Don Host Oblast, Southern Russia
Result	Red Army victory: White Army cut in two; Beginning of the North Caucasus and Odessa operations.

Belligerents
Armed Forces of South Russia	(Russian Soviet Federative Socialist Republic) Russian SFSR

Commanders and leaders
(Don Republic) Konstantin Mamontov (Russia) Ivan Barbovitch (Russia) Sergei Toporkov	(Russian Soviet Federative Socialist Republic) Grigori Sokolnikov (Russian Soviet Federative Socialist Republic) Mikhail Levandovsky (Russian Soviet Federative Socialist Republic) Semyon Budyonny

Units involved
Don Army: 3rd Don Cavalry Corps; 4th Don Cavalry Corps; Volunteer Army: Consolidated Cavalry Corps; Volunteer infantry corps	Southern Front: 8th Army; 9th Army; 1st Cavalry Army

The Rostov–Novocherkassk Operation (January 6–10, 1920) was an offensive operation on the Don River of the Southern and the South-Eastern Frontof the Red Army against the White Guard troops during the Russian Civil War.

== The operation ==
In December 1919, the Red Army had conducted the successful Donbas operation (1919) in which the Donets River had been crossed and the Donbas conquered. On the night of January 6 to 7, 1920, Red troops captured Taganrog on the Sea of Azov, effectively splitting the White Army into two.

On January 7, troops of the 9th Red Army also captured Novocherkassk, the capital of the Don Cossacks. This forced Konstantin Mamontov's 4th Don Cavalry Corps, in defiance of Denikin's order, to retreat behind the Don.
On the night of January 8–9, troops of the 8th and 1st Cavalry armies began street fighting in Rostov-on-Don, and on January 10 completely captured it.

The Rostov–Novocherkassk Operation was followed by the North Caucasus and Odessa operations.

On January 16, the Supreme War Council of the Entente decided to lift the economic blockade against the RSFSR.

== See also ==
- Bibliography of the Russian Revolution and Civil War
- Outline of the Russian Revolution and Civil War
- Index of articles related to the Russian Revolution and Civil War
- The "Russian" Civil Wars, 1916–1926: Ten Years That Shook the World
- Russia in Flames: War, Revolution, Civil War, 1914–1921
- Russia in Revolution: An Empire in Crisis, 1890 to 1928
- Russia: Revolution and Civil War, 1917—1921
- The Russian Revolution: A New History
