= Alexander V. Golubintzev =

Russian general

- Александр Васильевич Голубинцев
- Born: February 28, 1882; Don Host Oblast
- Died: April 19, 1963 (aged 81); Cleveland, Ohio
- Military career
- Allegiance: Russia (1904–1917); Committee for the Liberation of the Peoples of Russia (1945)
- Branch: Imperial Russian Army (1904–1917); White Army (1917–1919); Don Army; Armed Forces of South Russia; Wehrmacht; KONR; Russian Liberation Army
- Rank: Major General
- Commands: 3rd Don Cavalry Regiment
- Conflicts: Russo-Japanese War; World War One; Eastern Front; Russian Civil War; Southern Front of the Russian Civil War; Khopyor–Don Operation; Evacuation of the Crimea; World War Two; Eastern Front; Operation Barbarossa

Alexander Vassilievich Golubintzev (Russian: Александр Васильевич Голубинцев; February 28, 1882 – April 19, 1963) was a member of the Imperial Russian Army. He joined the army during the Russo-Japanese War in 1904. He was a colonel in the army when the Russian Revolution broke out in 1917. He became a Major General in the Don Army and the Armed Forces of South Russia and one of the leaders of the counterrevolutionary White movement.

At the start of World War I he was a colonel and commander of the 3rd Don Cavalry Regiment (Russian:Донской 3-й казачий полк). as well as a military commander and organizer of the 4th Cossack Volunteer Cavalry Regiment at the stanitsa Ust-Khoperskaya. He joined the March on Moscow led by General Konstantin Mamontov as a commander of the 5th Don Cavalry Division and later fled in exile to Bulgaria, Germany, and the United States. He died on April 19, 1963, in Cleveland, Ohio.

== Writings ==
- Golubintzev, A.V., «Russian Vandea», 1995

== See also ==
- Don Army
- Don Republic
- Volunteer Army
- Russian Civil War
