= Mikhail Promtov =

Russian lieutenant general (1857–1951)

Mikhail Nikolayevich Promtov
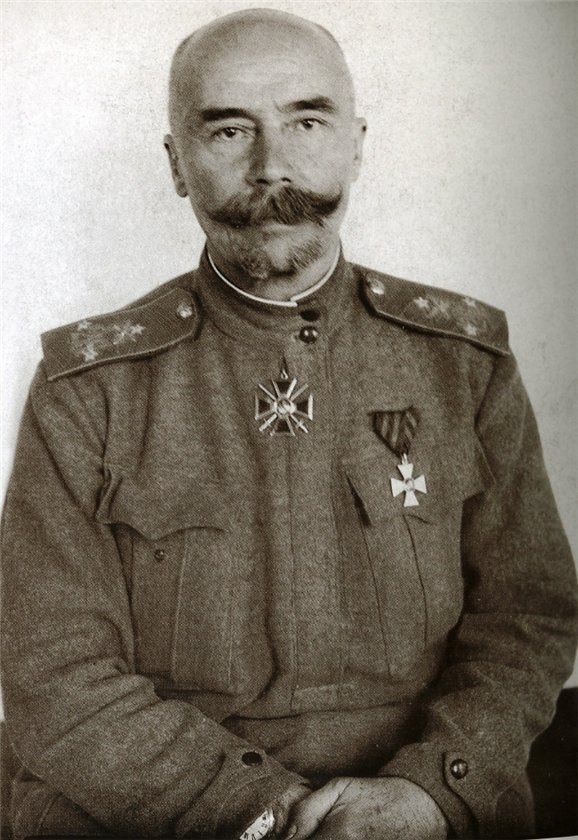
- Born: June 12, 1857 Poltava, Russian Empire
- Died: 1950 or 1951 Belgrade, Yugoslavia
- Allegiance: Russian Empire; White Movement
- Branch: Imperial Russian Army; Armed Forces of South Russia
- Commands: Artillery Brigade, 32nd Infantry Division (Russian Empire); 23rd Army Corps (Russian Empire); 2nd Army Corps (Armed Forces of South Russia)
- Conflicts: Russo-Turkish War; Russo-Japanese War; World War I Russian Civil War

Mikhail Nikolayevich Promtov (Russian: Михаил Николаевич Промтов; June 12, 1857 – 1950 or 1951) was a Russian lieutenant general and artillery officer in the Imperial Russian Army. He participated in the Russo-Turkish War of 1877–1878, the Russo-Japanese War, commanded forces during World War I, and participated in the White Movement in southern Russia. Later, he emigrated to Yugoslavia.

== Education ==
Promtov was the son of Nikolai Dmitrievich Promtov, a major general in the artillery division of the Imperial Russian Army. He was educated at the Petrovsky Poltava Military Gymnasium before beginning his military service on August 9, 1874. In May 1877, he graduated from the Mikhailovsky Artillery School and was commissioned as a second lieutenant in the 13th Artillery Brigade.

== Military service ==
In December 1878, Promtov was promoted to first lieutenant for his service in the Russo-Turkish War (1877-1878). After the war, he served as senior adjutant to the Chief of Artillery of the 7th Army Corps from 1881 to 1898. In 1883, Promtov was promoted to headquarters captain, in 1892 to captain, and in 1899 to lieutenant colonel (with seniority from April 1, 1899). He then graduated from the Officer Artillery School. In 1899, Promtov was appointed commander of the 6th Battery of the 26th Artillery Brigade.

=== Russo-Japanese War ===
At the beginning of 1904, Promtov and his battery entered the Russo-Japanese War. For the valor he displayed in battles near Liaoyang under the command of General P.K. Rennenkampf, Promtov was awarded the Order of St. George of the 4th degree in August 1904 and was promoted to colonel in 1905. In June 1907, he was awarded the St. George Golden Arms. From 1907 to 1910, Promtov commanded the 3rd Division of the 30th Artillery Brigade. For excellence in combat training, he was promoted to major general in 1911 and appointed commander of the 32nd artillery brigade. He received awards for perfect service, including the Order of St. Anne, 2nd class (1898); the Order of St. Vladimir 4th class (1902) with swords and a bow for courage in battles against the Japanese (1905); the Order of St. Vladimir 3rd class with swords (1909); and the Order of St. Stanislav 1st class (1912).

=== World War I ===
Promtov entered the war as commander of the 32nd artillery brigade. On November 2, 1914, he was appointed commander of the 82nd Infantry Division, which was part of the force besieging the fortress of Przemysl. On February 14, 1915, he was promoted to lieutenant general. During the general offensive of the Southwestern Front in 1916, he was a member of the 9th Army of General P. A. Lechitsky. In early June 1916, he became commander of the Combined Corps of the 9th Army (82nd and 103rd Infantry Divisions). The Promtov corps, along with the 3rd cavalry corps of General Count F.A. Keller, was tasked with pursuing the retreating southern group of the 7th Austro-Hungarian army. On June 10, 1916, the Promtov corps occupied Suceava, capturing 27 officers, 1235 lower ranks, and 27 machine guns. In April 1917, he commanded the 23rd Army Corps, and from September 1917, he commanded the 11th Army.

In December 1917, at the initiative of the Military Revolutionary Committee, with the participation of S. V. Petlyura, Promtov was removed from his post as army commander.

=== Member of the White Movement ===
At the end of 1918, Promtov entered the service of General A.I. Denikin's Volunteer Army. In the autumn of 1919, he commanded the 2nd Army Corps of the All-Union Federal League of Justice. After successful battles with the Petliurists, the SSYUR retreated from the Fastov - Bila Tserkva area to the Znamenka - Nikopol line. Instead of crossing the Dnieper in the rear of the 14th Soviet Army and going to the Crimea to join the corps, Ya. A. Slaschev received an order from General N. N. Schilling to defend Odessa, which he called the "fatal mistake" of General Schilling. Promtov, carrying out the order, led the 2nd Army Corps to the city, which had already been abandoned by the White troops. In January 1920, moving away from Odessa, he joined the units of General N.E. Bredov and retreated to the area occupied by the Polish army. On February 25-26, 1920, he was interned with troops in Poland. In July 1920, he and the remaining officers were sent from the camp to the Crimea, where he was appointed to the command of the commander-in-chief of the Russian Army, General Pyotr Wrangel. He evacuated from Crimea with the army in November 1920.

=== Life in exile ===
After evacuating to Constantinople, Promtov moved to Yugoslavia, where he was hired by the Ministry of War. From December 11, 1924, he served as Director of the Russian Crimean Cadet Corps, remaining in this position until 1929, when the corps was merged with the Russian Cadet Corps in Sarajevo to form the First Russian of Grand Prince Konstantin Konstantinovich Cadet Corps. General B. V. Adamovich was appointed director of the new corps. From November 5, 1930, Promtov headed the military courses of the EMRO in Yugoslavia. His article "On the History of the Breda Campaign" (Sentinel. 1933. No. 107) sparked sharp controversy among the expatriate community.

He died in Belgrade in 1950 or 1951 and was buried in the New Cemetery.

== Awards ==
- Order of St. Stanislav 2nd degree (1894)
- Order of St. Anna, 2nd degree (1898)
- Order of St. Vladimir 4th degree (1902)
- swords and bow to the Order of St. Vladimir 4th degree (1905)
- Golden weapon "For courage" (VP 3.11, 1906)
- Order of St. George 4th degree (VP July 28, 1907)
- Order of St. Vladimir 3rd degree (1909)
- Order of St. Stanislav 1st degree (1912)
- Order of St. Anna 1st degree with swords (VP January 13, 1915)
- Order of St. Vladimir, 2nd degree with swords (VP January 28, 1915)
- swords for the Order of St. Stanislav 1st degree (VP May 1, 1915)
- Order of the White Eagle with swords (VP October 22, 1915)

Preceded by	Commander of the Artillery Brigade, 32nd Infantry Division; 1911-1914	Succeeded by
Preceded by	Commander of the 23rd Army Corps; April 1917	Succeeded by
