= Chernetsov's Partisans =

Irregular military unit during the Russian Civil War

Colonel Chernetsov's Partisan Company
- Don Cossacks flag
- Active: November 1917 - February 1918
- Country: Don Republic
- Allegiance: Don Army, Volunteer Army
- Branch: Cavalry
- Nickname: Chernetsovtsy

Commanders
- Notable commanders: Vasily Chernetsov

Chernetsov's Partisans was an irregular military unit of the Don Army, commissioned under the act of ataman Alexey Kaledin on November 7, 1917, in the opening stages of Russian Civil War. The 600-man regiment-size unit was formed of Don Cossack officers and students of Novocherkassk. However, many Bolsheviks considered Vasily Chernetsov and his men brutal counter-revolutionaries, who were not entitled to protection when captured, as was the case with other prisoners of war. Colonel Chernetsov's death at the hands of the Bolsheviks was explored in Mikhail Sholokhov's novel And Quiet Flows the Don.

After Chernetsov's death the surviving members joined the Volunteer Army's Ice March at the end of February 1918.

== Commanders ==
- Colonel Vasily Chernetsov

== See also ==
- List of Don Army Units in the Civil War
- White movement
