= Voronezh–Povorino Operation =

Date	January 1919
Location	Voronezh Oblast
Result	defeat of the Don Army

Belligerents
Red Army	White Army

Commanders and leaders
Pēteris Slavens; Vladimir Gittis; Innokentiy Kozhevnikov	Pyotr Krasnov

Strength
8th Red Army; 9th Red Army; 10th Red Army; Kozhevnikov Group	70,000 troops 79 artillery

The Voronezh–Povorino Operation, was a battle in January 1919 between the White and Red Armies during the Russian Civil War around the city of Voronezh and the railway station of Povorino. The Red Army defeated the Don Army under Pyotr Krasnov.

== Prelude ==
During the autumn campaign of 1918, Krasnov's Don Army had forced the 10th Red Army to a partial retreat in the direction of Tsaritsyn, and secured for itself operational freedom in the northern direction. After striking at a gap between the 9th and 10th Red Armies, the Don Army Cavalry almost managed to break through to Kamyshin, forcing the Soviet High Command to redirect part of the forces from the Eastern Front to stop their advance. However, the success of the Don Army came at a high price, and some Don Cossack troops raised doubts on advancing further away from their home region.

When the German Army evacuated the territory of Ukraine in November 1918, the entire left flank of the Don Army became exposed. Taking advantage of this, parts of the right-flank 8th Red Army began to infiltrate the abandoned territory from the second half of November 1918, gradually enveloping the left flank of the Voronezh group of the Don Army. By December 3, they had reached the town of Valuyki.

At the same time, the 10th Red Army began to advance on the right flank towards the Ilovlya station. The Whites, underestimating the significance of exposing their left flank, weakened their strength in the Voronezh direction to concentrate their forces in the Tsaritsyn direction against the center of the 10th Red Army. As a result, the Whites formed two groups: the weakest - the Voronezh group, and the strongest - the Tsaritsyn group, rear-turned to each other. Both groups were linked by a thin thread of cavalry forces. The Voronezh group consisted of 18,000 to 22,000 fighters with 16 guns, the Tsaritsyn group up to 50,000 soldiers with 63 guns.

The main command of the Red Army decided to take advantage of the situation and deal a decisive blow to the Don Army. The command of the Southern Front was assigned the task of immediately attacking and destroying the Voronezh group of the White army by concentrating all the Red reserves, including the Kulovnikov group from the Eastern Front.
Also the Kozhevnikov Group (20,000 men with 20 guns), deployed on the Valuyki-Kupyansk front, was to move to Millerovo-Boguchar against the White Voronezh group. Thus, up to 50,000 Red Army soldiers, about half of all forces of the Southern Soviet Front, were ready for action against the Voronezh group.
The North Caucasian Front was to assist the Southern Front with the advance of the 11th Red Army towards the Novocherkassk-Rostov-on-Don front.

With the Germans gone, General Krasnov needed to cover a new 600-kilometer front. Not having enough forces for this, and also with the beginning of the disintegration of the Don army (at the end of December whole Don units began to leave the front, some Stanitsas even installed Soviet power), Ataman Krasnov was forced to seek help from the Volunteer Army.

== The Battle ==
Meanwhile, Pēteris Slavens, commander of the Soviet Southern Front assigned the following tasks to its units:

- the Kozhevnikov group attacked on the Kantemirovka -Mitrofanovka front by the end of January 12;
- The 8th Army conducted an offensive on both banks of the Don;
- The 9th Army moved towards the section of the Khopyor River between Novokhopyorsk and Uryupinsk, treathening the link with the Tsaritsyn group of the enemy near Budarino;
- The 10th Army, defending the Tsaritsyn district, at the same time developed an offensive in the Kamyshin direction in order to reduce pressure on the flank of the 9th Army.

On January 8, the right flank of the 8th Army was already on the Black Kalitva River, and on January 10, after a small fight, Kozhevnikov's group captured Starobilsk. However, Krasnov at the same time struck a short blow at the junction of the 8th and 9th armies in the Voronezh direction, inflicting a major defeat near Poverino on the Inza Revolutionary Division, which was on the left flank of the 8th Army. But the 9th Army managed to restore the situation and again take Povorino, and by January 15 - Novokhopyorsk. Only on January 21 the 9th Army captured Uryupinsk.

Fearing for their flanks, units of the Don Army had already on January 17 been forced to start a withdrawal from the Abramovka-Koleno area. Since this withdrawal made the efforts of the Kozhevnikov group unnecessary, on January 18, the commander of the Southern Front sent the group along the Markovka-Taly line for a deeper infiltration against the Voronezh group, with one division heading towards Lugansk. The 9th Army was to rebuild its front to the southeast and head along the Povorino-Tsaritsyn railway. Most of the forces of the 8th Army also had to operate along the left bank of the Don.

From that moment the Voronezh group ceased to render serious resistance and the front broke up. Entire Cossack regiments surrendered or arbitrarily dispersed to their homes. On January 21, the command of the Southern Front considered it possible to move on to the second task: the defeat of the Tsaritsyn group.

== Result ==
As a result of the operation, the Don army of Ataman Krasnov was completely defeated, on February 1 the command of the Southern Front ordered the persecution of its remains. The operation was completed on February 8–9, when parts of the 9th and 10th armies came into contact with each other in the vicinity of the Archeda station.
In April 1919, Rostov-on-Don was retaken by the Red Army.

However, the concentration of Red armies of the Southern Front around Voronezh–Povorino, led to the weakening of troops in the Donbas, where on January 25 a fresh division of the Volunteer Army landed in Mariupol. This led to an offensive on Lugansk on January 27–28. As a result, fighting ensued for the Donbas.

Pyotr Krasnov was replaced as Ataman of the Don cossacks by Afrikan P. Bogaewsky on February 19, 1919, and on January 8 1919 the Don Army became part of the united Armed Forces of South Russia under overall command of Anton Denikin.

== See also ==
- Bibliography of the Russian Revolution and Civil War
- Outline of the Russian Revolution and Civil War
- Index of articles related to the Russian Revolution and Civil War
- The "Russian" Civil Wars, 1916–1926: Ten Years That Shook the World
- Russia in Flames: War, Revolution, Civil War, 1914–1921
- Russia in Revolution: An Empire in Crisis, 1890 to 1928
- Russia: Revolution and Civil War, 1917—1921
- The Russian Revolution: A New History

== Bibliography ==
- Н. Е. Какурин, И. И. Вацетис «Гражданская война. 1918—1921» — СПб: ООО «Издательство „Полигон“», 2002. ISBN 5-89173-150-9
- А. И. Егоров «Разгром Деникина, 1919 год»// «Гражданская война в России: Разгром Деникина» — Москва: ООО «Издательство АСТ», 2003. ISBN 5-17-015247-7
