= Alexey V. Kravtsov =

Alexei V. Kravtzov (1879 – December 30, 1918) was a colonel of the Imperial Russian Army and Don Republic officer, killed in the Battle of Loznoye during the Russian Civil War. He was a military commander and organizer of the 1st Cossack Volunteer Cavalry Regiment at the stanitsa Ust-Medveditskaya.

Alexei was born in Novocherkassk, Don Host Oblast, to Yesaul Vladimir A. Kravtzov, hero of the Russo-Japanese War of the a Don Cossacks family of Kravtzov. Kravtzov graduated from Novocherkassk Military School for the 1st Class. Yesaul on September 5, 1914. At the start of World War I Alexei Kravtzov was put in charge of the 57th Don Cossacks Regiment. During the opening stages of Russian Civil War Kravtzov served in the Don Army. He organized 1st Cossack Volunteer Cavalry Regiment in March 1918 at the stanitsa Ust-Medveditskaya, and was commissioned as a colonel in the Don Army. His Regiment took heavy losses during the Ice March. He shot himself not to fall into the Bolshevik hands wounded during the Battle of Loznoye from December 22 to December 30, 1918, where his regiment save by manoeuvre corps of Don Army under command of General Alexnder V. Golubintzev.

== See also ==
- Volunteer Army
