= 1st Cossack Volunteer Cavalry Regiment =

- Don Cossacks flag
- Active: March–April 1918
- Country: Don Republic
- Allegiance: Don Army, Volunteer Army
- Branch: Cavalry

Commanders
- Notable commanders: Alexei V. Kravtzov; Grigori V. Tatarkin

The 1st Cossack Volunteer Cavalry Regiment was a volunteer of Don Cossack cavalry regiment that served in the Don Army during the Russian Civil War. The unit was formed in March–April 1918 by Colonel Alexei V. Kravtzov to serve with the forces of Don Army in the opening stages of Russian Civil War. Included to the Army Corps of Gen. Tatarkin on May 19.

== Civil War ==
Cossacks from the Ust-Medveditskaya okrug was brought together by Colonel Alexey V. Kravtzov at the stanitsa Ust-Medveditskaya, on Don Republic territories in preparation for an anti-Bolshevik action in Don Host Oblast. After that was involved in numerous battles during the months-long prelude of the Russian Civil War in Don Host Oblast, including the ill-fated Battle of Loznoye from December 22 to December 30, 1918, where regiment save by manoeuvre corps of Don Army under command of General Golubintzev. In this battle Colonel Kravtzov shot himself not to fall into the Bolshevik hands. In March 1919 part of 4th Don Cossacks Cavalry Division.

== Commanders ==
- Colonel Alexei V. Kravtzov.
- Colonel Grigori V. Tatarkin

== See also ==
- List of Don Army Units in the Civil War
- White movement
- Don Army
- Volunteer Army
- Russian Civil War
