= Evacuation of Novorossiysk =

Evacuation from Novorossiysk in 1920

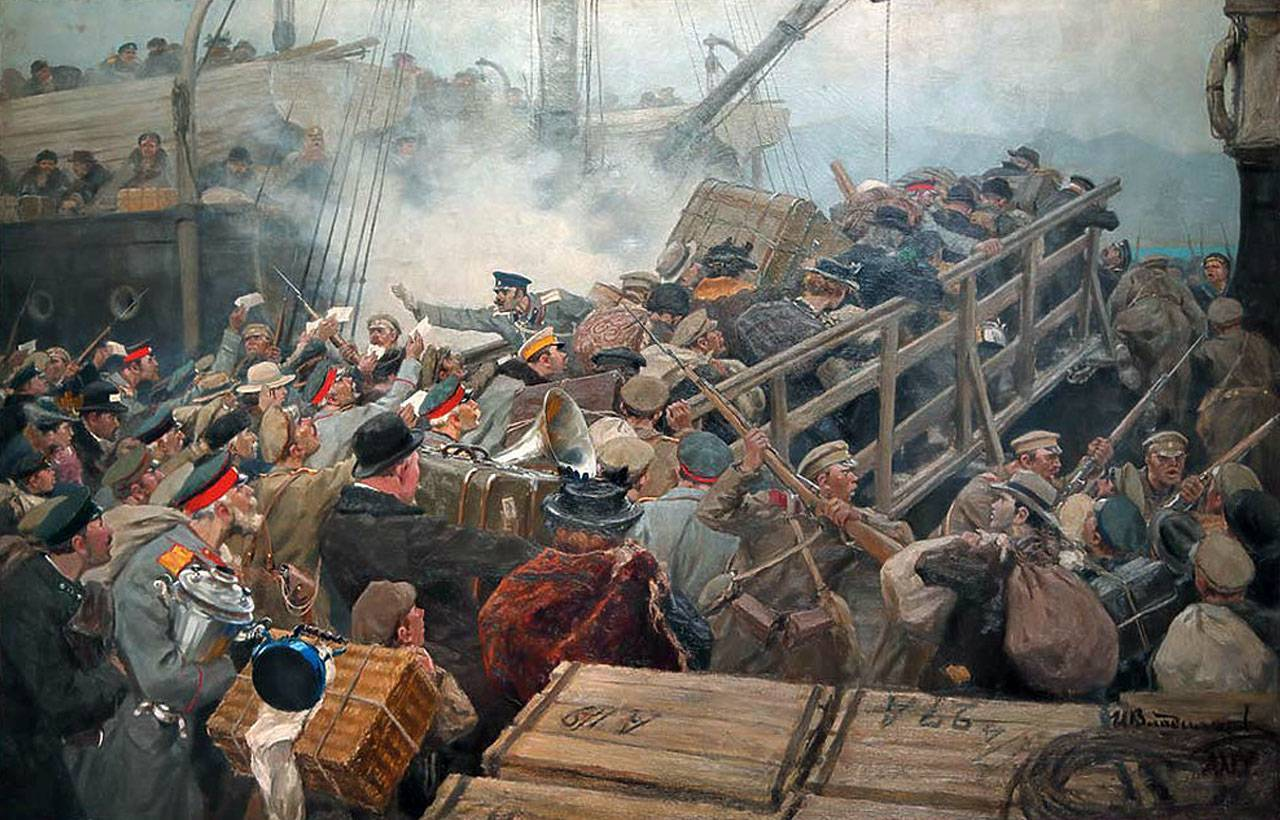
Flight of the bourgeoisie from Novorossiysk in 1920 by Ivan Vladimirov.

The Evacuation of Novorossiysk (Новороссийская эвакуация) or the Novorossiysk Catastrophe (Новороссийская катастрофа) was the evacuation of the White Armed Forces of South Russia and refugees from Novorossiysk in March 1920, during the Russian Civil War, in which thousands of officers, soldiers and Cossacks of the White Army and civilians were left behind and killed by the Red Army and the Green Army. In total, some 33,000 people were executed.

== Chronology of events ==
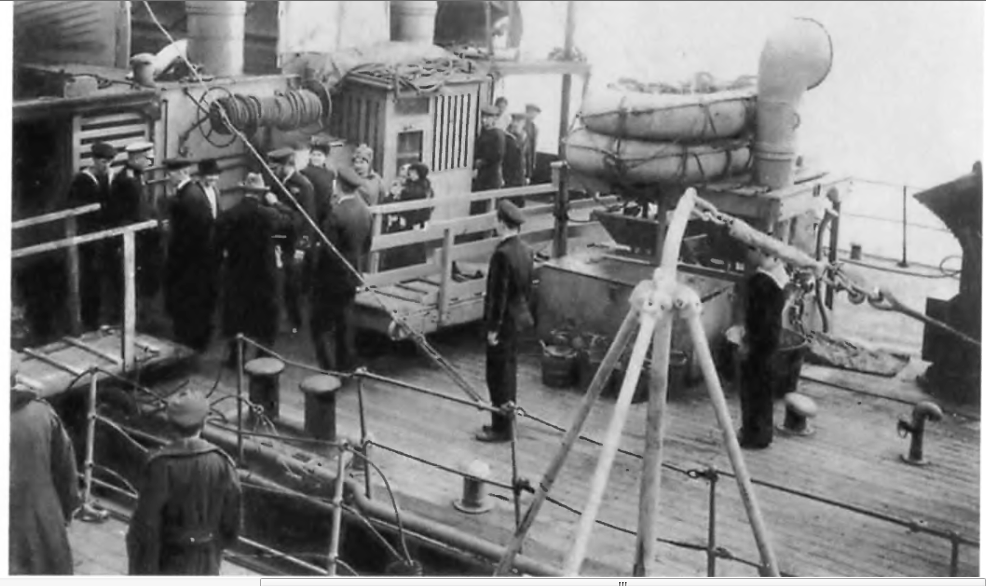
Denikin on the Russian destroyer Captain Saken during the Novorossiysk evacuation, March 1920

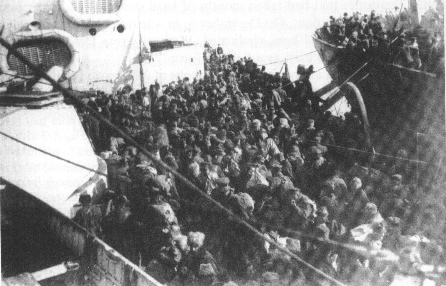
White troops during the Novorossiysk evacuation, March 1920

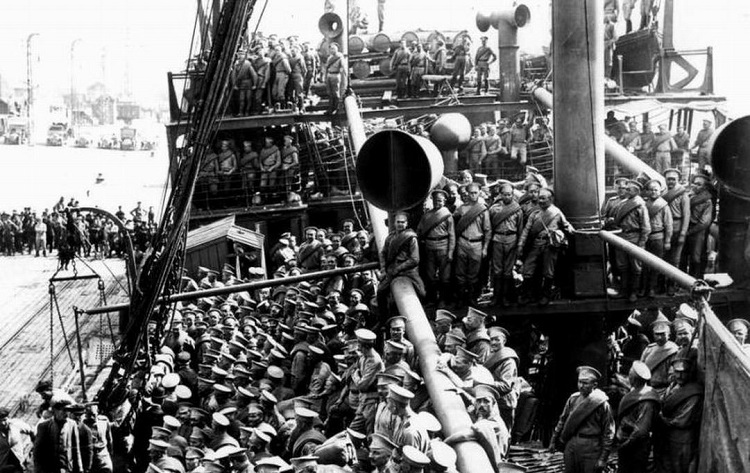
The soldiers on the ships are ready to sail

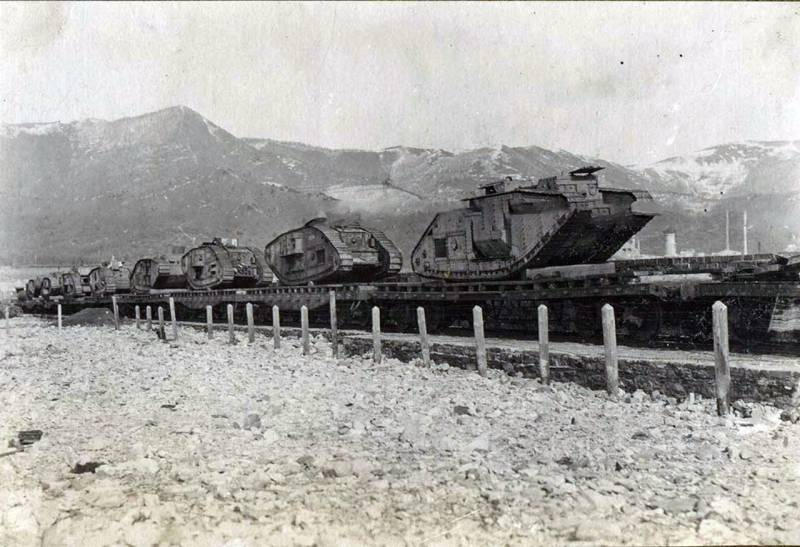
Abandoned tanks of the White Army

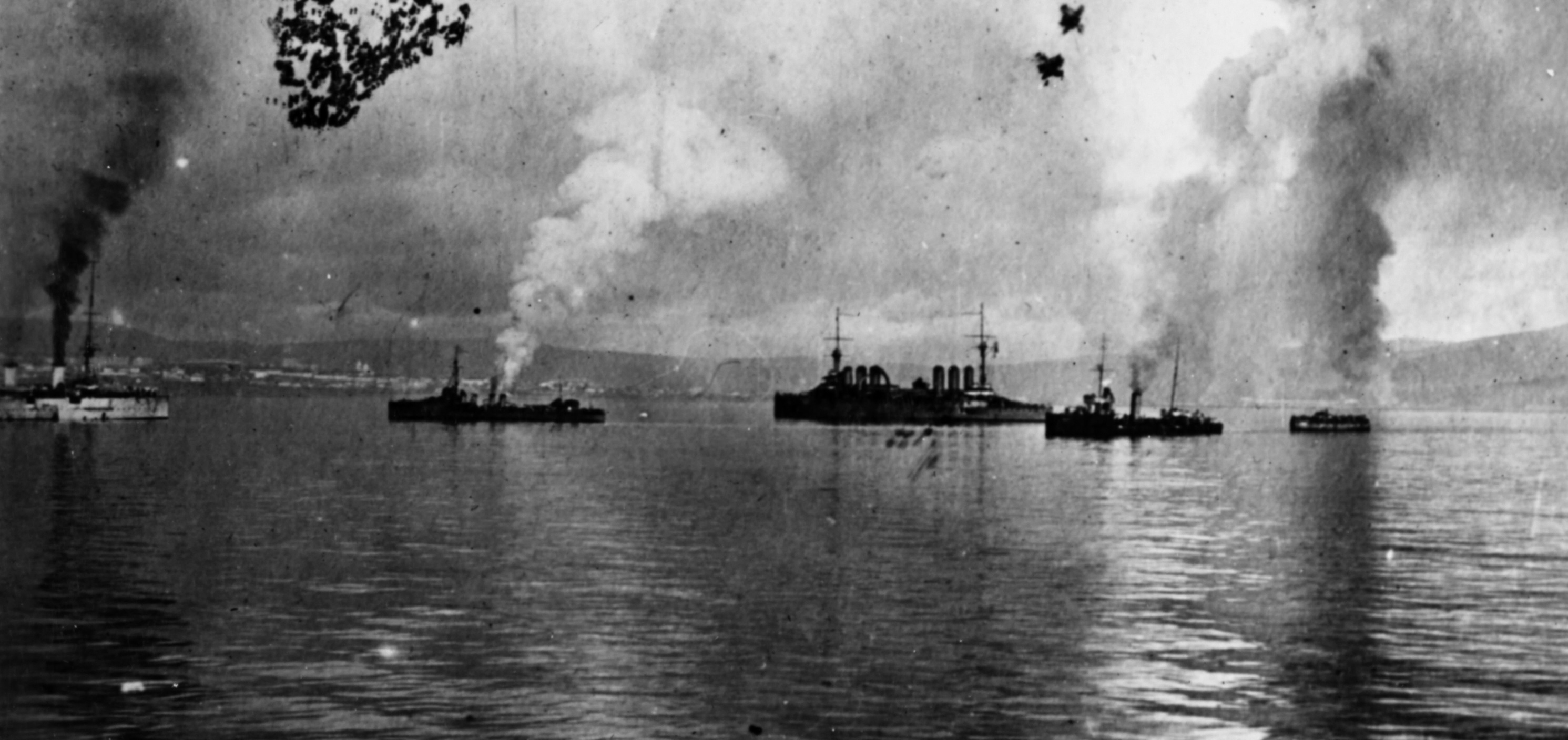
Waldeck-Rousseau (French) and Etna (Italian) in Novorossiysk

By March 11, 1920, the front line was only 40–50 kilometers (25–31 mi) away from Novorossiysk. The Don and Kuban Armies, which were disorganized by that time, withdrew in great disorder. The line of defense was only held by the remnants of the Volunteer Army, which had been reduced and renamed to the Volunteer Corps, and which had great difficulty in containing the onslaught of the Red Army. The Cossacks failed to reach Taman, and as a result many of them ended up in Novorossiysk with the sole purpose of getting on a ship. In total, the Armed Forces in the South of Russia in the Novorossiysk area on the eve of the evacuation amounted to 25,200 bayonets and 26,700 sabers.

Meanwhile, there were not enough ships in the harbour. Some of them were late due to stormy weather, while others were unable to arrive on time due to quarantines established in foreign ports. All ships arriving from Russia with refugees were kept in quarantine for a long time, because of the terrible typhus epidemic in Russia.

The command ordered the immediate loading of the wounded and sick soldiers, but this order was never carried out. Moreover, military forces flocking to Novorossiysk began to occupy ships on their own, and officials cared more about the evacuation of property that could be sold after the war.

On March 11, General George Milne, Commander-in-Chief of the British troops in the region, and Admiral Seymour, Commander of the Black Sea Fleet, arrived from Constantinople in Novorossiysk. General Anton Denikin was told that only 5,000-6,000 people could be evacuated by the British. At night, British naval vessels opened fire for the first time towards the mountains surrounding Novorossiysk. The shelling was provoked by the fact that Green soldiers had broken into the city prison and released several hundred prisoners, which fled with them into the mountains.

On March 13, the first signs of panic appeared. On March 16, the South Russian Government was disbanded. On March 17, Yekaterinodar was taken by the Red Army. On March 22, around 22:00 hours, the Red Army occupied the Abinsk station and moved further towards Novorossiysk. The roads were crammed with carts, cars and military equipment left behind in the impassable mud. Only the railway remained open for movement, and it was used by Denikin's staff train, accompanied by armoured trains. The plan was to get the troops in the harbour sent off to the Crimea, while horses and artillery were to be left behind. Parts of the Red Army under command of Semyon Budyonny also used the railway, leaving behind their heavy weapons and artillery.

On March 25, 1920, parts of the Red Army, with the help of partisans, cashed the Volunteers from the Tunnelnaya station and crossed the pass into Gaiduk, a suburb of Novorossiysk. This blocked the railway tracks and forced the White Guards to leave their three armoured trains behind here.

On the night of March 26, in Novorossiysk warehouses were burning, and tanks with oil and shells were exploding. The evacuation was conducted under the cover of the second battalion of the Royal Scots Fusiliers under command of Lieutenant-Colonel Edmund Hakewill-Smith and the Allied squadron commanded by Admiral Seymour, which fired towards the mountains, preventing the Reds from approaching the city. At dawn on March 26, the last ship, the Italian transport Baron Beck entered the Tsemessky Bay, causing great turmoil as the people didn't know where it would land. The panic reached its apogee when the crowd rushed to the gangway of this last ship. The military and civilian refugees on the transport ships were taken to the Crimea, Constantinople, Lemnos, the Prince Islands, Serbia, Cairo, and Malta.

On March 27, the Red Army entered the city. The Don, Kuban, and Terek regiments, left on the shore, had no choice but to accept the terms and surrender to the Red Army.

== Massacre of prisoners ==
Many of the officers of the Armed Forces of the South of Russia left in Novorossiysk committed suicide, not wanting to be captured, and many of those who became prisoners were later executed.

== Consequences ==
About 40,000 soldiers were evacuated by Russian and Allied ships, without horses or any heavy equipment, while about 20,000 men were left behind and either dispersed or were captured by the Red Army. Following the disastrous Novorossiysk evacuation, Denikin stepped down and the military council elected Pyotr Wrangel as the new Commander-in-Chief of the White Army.

== Involvement of officials ==
The last commander of Novorossiysk (from February to March 1920) was Major-General Alexei Korvin-Krukovsky.
The commission that organized the evacuation was headed by General Alexander Kutepov.
At the last moment (after March 20), the chief of the communications service, Major-General M. M. Ermakov, was engaged in the evacuation of troops to the Crimea.
The chief of the Black Sea province and the department of the Ministry of Internal Affairs of the South-Russian government was N. S. Karinsky.

== Participating ships ==
=== Russia ===
- Ayu-dag (evacuated the headquarters of General Kutepov)
- Rossiya (evacuated 4,000 Don Cossacks under command of Vladimir Sidorin).
- Doob (evacuated parts of the Kuban army)
- Bespokoynyy
- Pylkiy
- Kapitan Saken
- pilot ship Letchik
- auxiliary cruiser Tsesarevich Georgiy (evacuated Denikin and his headquarters)
- submarine Utka
- hospital transport Kherson
- Violetta

=== Italy ===
- Baron Beck
- cruiser Etna

=== United Kingdom ===
- battleship HMS Emperor of India
- Hannover (captured from the Germans after the First World War).
- trading steamer Bremerhaven (captured from the Germans after the First World War).
- HMS Stuart
- HMS Montrose
- HMS Calypso
- aviation transport HMS Pegasus
- 5 torpedo boats

=== France ===
- a dreadnought
- cruiser Waldeck-Rousseau
- a destroyer
- a gunboat

=== Greece ===
- destroyer Ierax

=== United States ===
- destroyer USS Smith Thompson
- cruiser USS Galveston

== See also ==
- Bibliography of the Russian Revolution and Civil War
- Outline of the Russian Revolution and Civil War
- Index of articles related to the Russian Revolution and Civil War
- The "Russian" Civil Wars, 1916–1926: Ten Years That Shook the World
- Russia in Flames: War, Revolution, Civil War, 1914–1921
- Russia in Revolution: An Empire in Crisis, 1890 to 1928
- Russia: Revolution and Civil War, 1917—1921
- The Russian Revolution: A New History
