= 8th Army (RSFSR) =

Field army of the Red Army (1918–1920)

The 8th Army was a field army of the Red Army during the Russian Civil War which existed from 26 September 1918 until 20 March 1920.

== History ==
Position of the 8th Army in summer 1919

In October-December 1918, the 8th Army conducted ineffective military operations against the Don Army in the Voronezh-Liskin direction. In January 1919, it participated in the successful Voronezh–Povorino Operation against the Don Army. In March 1919, it conducted heavy defensive battles in the Donbass around Lugansk.

On 14 August 1919, the 8th Army was included in the Southern Front Group under the command of Vladimir Selivachyov. It had a total of 24,000 bayonets, 3,500 sabers, 1,170 machine guns and 193 guns. In August 1919, it participated in the offensive of the Shock Group of the Southern Front. After initial success and an advance of more than 80 kilometers, it was forced to retreat under pressure of Konstantin Mamontov's cavalry actions into the deep rear of the 8th Army. The Don Army forced the 8th Army to retreat beyond the Potudan River, exposing its flanks.

On 21 September 1919, the 8th Army occupies defensive positions between Nizhnedevitsk and the right bank of the Don River. Communication with the Southern Front's headquarters was lost. The 12th, 13th divisions of the Army are judged as incapacitated in official reports. The 15th division had lost two regiments and a battery in battle. The 31st division almost fled and its remains were disarmed and sent to the Revolutionary Tribunal.

On 1 October, Mamontov attacked the rear of the 8th Army again and Voronezh was lost. Commander Andrei Rataysky and chief of staff Gorchakov withdrew the Army from encirclement by the White forces, using the river Ikorets as a natural barrier. Many soldiers defected to the White Army, including former commanders like A.S. Nechvolodov and V.F. Tarasov. On 7 October. The Party leadership has taken urgent measures to strengthen the command and staff of the Army.

In November 1919, parts of the 8th Army, together with the 1st Cavalry Corps of Semyon Budyonny, renamed on 9 December 9 as the First Cavalry Army, dealt a crushing blow to the troops of Mamontov and Andrei Shkuro. Voronezh, the railway node Kastornoy and the village Vyoshenskaya were retaken. The Red Army regrouped on the right bank of the Bityug river and on 24 November 1919, Brobov was taken after heavy fighting. On 4 December Pavlovsk was conquered and by the end of December, Lugansk. On 4 January 1920, as a result of the breakthrough of Mamontov's units, a brigade of the 16th Division of the 8th Army was defeated. On 8 January, parts of the 33rd Division, along with the Budyonny's Cavalry, occupied Rostov-on-Don, Novocherkassk and Nakhichevan.

On 10 January 1920, the 8th Army became subordinated to the South-Eastern Front of the RSFSR and on 16 January the Army was part of the Caucasian Front.
After a short period of rest, the 8th Army continued fighting heavy battles with losses in the Bataysk swamps and along the banks of the Don river. Especially the 15th, 16th, 31st and 33rd divisions suffered heavy defeats. On 22 January, the Red Army decided to stop its frontal attacks on Bataysk. The units were regrouped to force the Don River near Novocherkassk or Manychivsk, in coordination with the First Cavalry Army.

On 14 February, the White Army broke through in the Kuleshovka area and the 9th, 15th, 16th and 33rd divisions withdrew behind the river Don, while the 3rd brigade of the 40th Division was defeated. On 21 February, as a result of a strong counter-attack by the Whites, Rostov and Nakhichevan were abandoned by the Red Army. On 23 February, an attack on Rostov was again repulsed by the Whites.

In March 1920, the 8th Army participated in the further offensive of the Red Army towards the South, the occupation of the Kuban, Novorossiysk and the defeat of Denikin's troops in the Northern Caucasus.

On 20 March 1920 the 8th Army was disbanded and the administration was transferred to the Caucasian Labor Army.

== Commanders ==
=== Commanders ===
- Vsevolod Chernavin (26.09.1918 - 01.12.1918)
- Vladimir Gittis (01.12.1918 - 23.12.1918)
- Mikhail Tukhachevsky (24.01.1919 - 15.03.1919)
- Tichon Hvesin (15.03.1919 — 08.05.1919)
- Vladimir Lyubimov (08.05.1919 — 02.07.1919)
- Vladimir Selivachev (14.08.1919 — 19.09.1919)
- Andrei Rataysky, acting (03.07.1919 — 12.10.1919)
- Grigori Sokolnikov (12.10.1919 — 20.03.1920)
- Alexander Aleksandrov, assistant commander (12.10.1919 — 20.03.1920).

=== Chief of Staff ===
- Sergei Mezheninov (03.12.1918 — 31.01.1919)

=== Members of the Revolutionary Military Council include ===
- Iona Yakir
- Georgy Bazilevich
- Arkady Rosengolts
- Pyotr Baranov
- Voldemar Aussem
