= Khopyor–Don Operation =

- Part of the Southern Front of the Russian Civil War
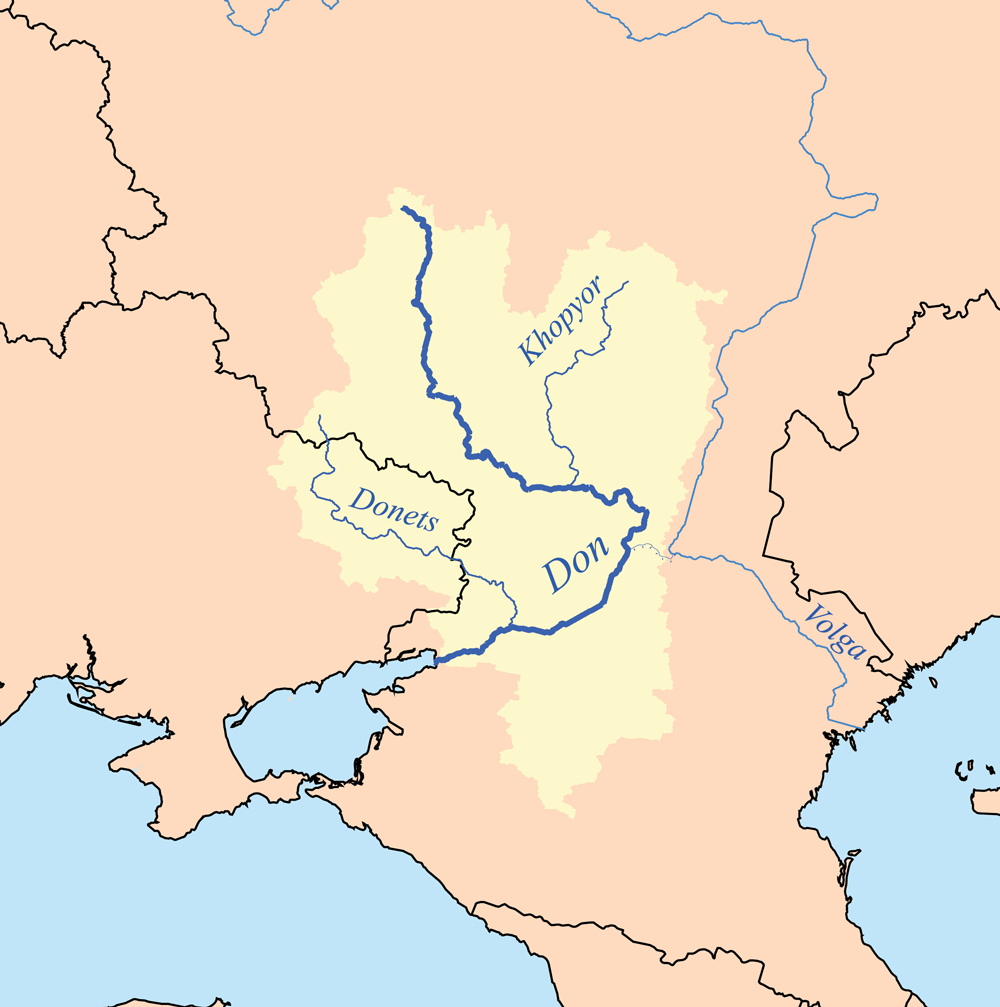
- Khopyor and Don rivers
Date	November 20 – December 8, 1919
Location	Voronezh Governorate, Don Host Oblast
Result	Red Army victory

Belligerents
(Russia) Don Army	(Russian Soviet Federative Socialist Republic) Red Army

Commanders and leaders
(Russia) Vladimir Sidorin	(Russian Soviet Federative Socialist Republic) Alexander Stepin (Russian Soviet Federative Socialist Republic) Boris Dumenko

Strength
26,900	18,000 (initially)

The Khopyor–Don Operation (November 20 – December 8, 1919) was an offensive during the Russian Civil War of the 9th Army of the Southeastern Front of the Red Army, reinforced by the Cavalry Corps of the 10th Army, against the forces of the Don Army, in order to ensure the stability of the left wing of the Southern Front of the Red Army and reach the Don River.

== Prelude ==
The Red Army had successfully conducted the Voronezh-Kastornensk Operation, defeating the troops of the AFSR. The withdrawal of the Volunteer Army to the south exposed the left flank of the Don Army. Therefore, the Don Army was forced in mid-November 1919 to abandon any offensive towards the north, as the Red Army prepared an attack.

By the time the operation began, the Don Army commanded by General Vladimir Sidorin, held a defensive line over Bobrov, Berezovka, and Archedinskaya. His forces amounted to about 13,700 bayonets, 13,200 sabers, 90 guns and 500 machine guns.

The Red 9th Army, under command of Alexander Stepin, and the 10th Army Cavalry Corps, under command of Boris Dumenko, numbered in total 13,400 bayonets, 4,600 sabers, 160 guns and 660 machine guns.

The Red Army command's plan was to attack with the main forces of the Ninth Army (the 36th, 23rd and 14th Rifle Divisions) and Dumenko's Cavalry Corps, at the junction between the 3rd and 2nd Don Corps, defeat them and occupy the city of Pavlovsk on the Don River. To ensure the success of the main offensive, two secondary attacks were also planned: one on the right flank of the army by Mikhail Blinov's cavalry division at Talovaya in cooperation with the left-flank divisions of the 8th Army of the Southern Front (33rd and 40th Rifle Divisions), with the aim of destroying the Likino-Bobrov group of the White Guards, and the other on the left flank by the 22nd Infantry Division in cooperation with the 32nd Infantry Division of the 10th Army, towards the villages of Kumylzhenskaya and Ust-Medveditskaya, with the task of destroying parts of the 1st Don Corps in the vicinity of the Medveditsa River.

== The battle ==
The offensive of the Red troops began on November 20. Blinov's cavalry division broke through the defense of the Don Army and on November 23 took Buturlinovka, in this battle the divisions commander Mikhail Blinov perished. However, the White 1st Don Cavalry Division, the 7th Don Cavalry Brigade of the 3rd Don Corps and the Cavalry group of the 2nd Don Corps made a flank counterattack on Blinov's cavalry division and by November 25 threw it back to the Talovaya area.

On November 26, the Red forces forced the Khopyor River on a broad front, creating a bridgehead on its right bank. The main forces of the Ninth Army broke through the defense of the 7th and Consolidated Don divisions of the 2nd Don Corps and on November 28, Dumenko's cavalry corps captured Kalach. The 22nd Infantry Division attacked the 6th Don Plastun Division and by November 26 pushed it to the southern bank of the Don.

The White Command decided to retake Kalach, by concentrating the Cavalry group of the 2nd Don Corps from the Buturlinovka area and the 14th Don Cavalry Brigade of the 1st Don Corps from the Nova Criusi area, to surround the Cavalry corps of Dumenko and defeat it. On November 28, the Don Army launched its counteroffensive. Under the onslaught of the White Guard combined division and the 14th Cavalry Brigade, the units of the 23rd Red Infantry Division were forced to go over to the defensive, and the 14th Infantry Division was forced to retreat.

At this time, Blinov's cavalry division resumed its offensive with the support of the 21st Infantry Division (from the reserves of the Ninth Army), and defeated the Cavalry group of the Second Don Corps in the Buturlinovka area. Together with the Cavalry corps of Dumenko, they began to encircle the White troops in the south. Unable to withstand the pressure of the Red Army, the Don Army began a general retreat. The troops of the Ninth Army and the cavalry corps together with the 40th Infantry Division, followed in pursuit, and on December 8 reached the Don River at Rossosh and Ust-Medveditskaya.

== Results ==
The successful choice of location for the main attack of the Red Army led to the division of the Don Army into two parts. This forced the White command to pull back towards the southern bank of the Don, to avoid complete defeat. The lack of cavalry prevented the Red troops from completing the encirclement of the enemy and gain a greater victory. The Red Army advanced up to 100 km at a slow rate, some 5 km per day.

== See also ==
- Bibliography of the Russian Revolution and Civil War
- Outline of the Russian Revolution and Civil War
- Index of articles related to the Russian Revolution and Civil War
- The "Russian" Civil Wars, 1916–1926: Ten Years That Shook the World
- Russia in Flames: War, Revolution, Civil War, 1914–1921
- Russia in Revolution: An Empire in Crisis, 1890 to 1928
- Russia: Revolution and Civil War, 1917—1921
- The Russian Revolution: A New History
