= Armed Forces of South Russia =

- Вооружённые силы Юга России
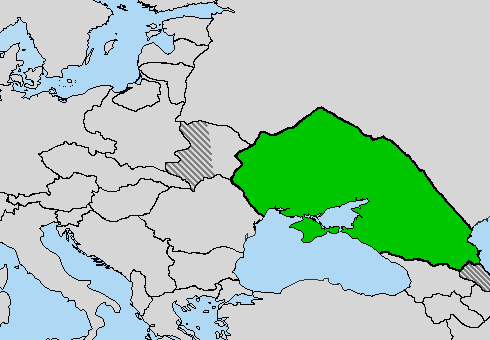
- Most territory controlled by South Russian forces as of October 1919
- Active: 8 January 1919 – April 1920
- Disbanded: April 1920
- Country: South Russia
- Allegiance: (Russia) General Command of the Armed Forces (1918–19); South Russia (1919–20)
- Size: 85,000 (January 1919); 160,000 (July 1919); 270,000 (October 1919)
- Engagements: Russian Civil War: Southern Front; Battle of Tsaritsyn; Northern Caucasus Operation (1918–1919); Battle of the Donbass and Don (1919); Vyoshenskaya Uprising; Kharkiv Operation (June 1919); Southern Front counteroffensive; Advance on Moscow (1919); Orel–Kursk operation; Voronezh–Kastornoye operation (1919); Khopyor–Don Operation; Kharkiv Operation (December 1919); Donbass Operation (1919); Rostov–Novocherkassk Operation; Odessa Operation (1920); North Caucasus Operation (1920); Ukrainian War of Independence: Capture of Kiev by the White Army; Battle of Peregonovka (1919); Battle of Kiev (December 1919)

Commanders
- Commander-in-Chief: Anton Denikin (until 4 April 1920); Pyotr Wrangel (from 4 April 1920)

Insignia
- Identification symbol

The Armed Forces of South Russia (AFSR) (Russian: Вооружённые силы Юга России, romanized: Vooruzhyonniye sily Yuga Rossii, VSYuR) were the unified military forces of the White movement in southern Russia between 1919 and 1920.

On 8 January 1919, the Armed Forces of South Russia were formed, incorporating the Volunteer Army and the Don Army. Subsequently, it included the Crimean-Azov Army, the Forces of Northern Caucasus and the Turkestan Army.

By October 1919, the army had 150,000 soldiers, which included 48,000 horsemen. The British had supplied 280,000 rifles, 4,898 machine guns, 917 cannons, 102 tanks, 194 airplanes 1,335 automobiles, 112 tractors, and what became known as Wrangel's fleet.

In May 1919, Denikin reorganized the Armed Forces of South Russia. Vladimir May-Mayevsky took command of the Volunteer Army, known formerly as the Caucasian Volunteer Army. Sidorin took command of the Don army, while Wrangel took command of the Caucasian Army, consisting mainly of the Kuban Cossacks.

The Caucasus Army disbanded on 29 January 1920 and was replaced by the short-lived Kuban Army. Troops of the Kuban Army ended up surrendering by 18–20 April 1920 to the Red Army. The Volunteer Army continued to exist from 22 May 1919 until 26/27 March 1920, when the remaining troops were evacuated from Novorossiysk to Crimea. Most then merged there with Wrangel's forces.

In early April 1920, Anton Denikin, commander-in-chief of the AFSR, delegated all authority to Pyotr Wrangel, who took command of the so-called Russian Army, which included all remaining units of the AFSR after its defeat in Northern Caucasus.

== General Command ==
The General Command of the Armed Forces of South Russia (Russian: Особое совещание при Главкоме ВСЮР Osoboye soveschaniye pri Glavkome VSYuR) was an administrative body in southern Russia between 1918 and 1920 performing government functions in the territory controlled by the troops of the Russian White movement's Volunteer Army and the Armed Forces of South Russia.

The predecessor to the General Command was the Political Council (Политический совет; Političeskij sovet) established in December 1917. In 1918, due to an increasing amount of territory falling under control of the Volunteer Army, the issue of civilian administration became more consequential. On 31 August 1918, the General Command was established under General Mikhail Vasilyevich Alekseyev. The functions of the General Command were clarified on 3 October 1918. The head of the Volunteer Army would be chairman of the General Command which would serve as an advisory body to the head. On 8 October 1918, following the death of General Alekseyev, the role of Supreme Leader was given to General Anton Denikin. Chairmen of the command were Abram Dragomirov (October 1918–September 1919) and Alexander Lukomsky (September–December 1919). The General Command was abolished on 30 December 1919 by Denikin and replaced with a Government of the Commander-in-Chief of the Armed Forces of South Russia (Правительством при Главнокомандующем ВСЮР; Pravitel'stvom pri Glavnokomanduyushchem VSYuR) and, in March 1920, the South Russian Government.

== Order of Battle of the AFSR, early 1919 ==
Volunteer Army (known as Caucasian Volunteer Army from 23 January – 22 May 1919), commanded by Gen. Anton Denikin (April 1918 – April 1920)

- 1st Army Corps (Gen. Kutepov)
- 2nd Army Corps (Gen. Mikhail Promtov)
- 5th Cavalry Corps (Gen. Yuzefovich)
- 3rd Kuban Cavalry Corps (Lt. Gen. Shkuro)
- Kyiv Army Group (Gen. Bredov)

Caucasus Army (split from Caucasian Volunteer Army on 22 May 1919), commanded by Lt. Gen. Pyotr Wrangel (21 May – 8 December 1919) and Lt. Gen. Viktor Pokrovsky (9 December 1919 – 8 February 1920)

- 1st Kuban Corps (Lt. Gen. Viktor Pokrovsky)
- 2nd Kuban Corps (Gen. Ulaguy, later Gen. Nahumenko)
- 4th Kuban Corps (Gen. Shatilov, later Gen. Toporkov)

Don Army (joined AFSR on 23 February 1919), commanded by Gen. Vladimir Sidorin (February 1919 and April 1920)

- Northern Group (Starshina Semiletov)
- Southern Group (Gen. S. Denisov)
- Trans-Don (Zadonskaya) Group (Col. Bykadorov)

Turkestan Army (formed on 22 January 1919), commanded by Ippolit Savitsky (April – July 1919), Aleksander Borovsky (July – October 1919) and Boris Kazanovich (October 1919 – February 1920).

- Transcaspian Composite Inf. Division (Maj. Gen. Lazarev)
- Turkestan Rifle Division (Maj. Gen. Litvinov)
- Cavalry Division (Maj. Gen. Oraz-Khan Sedar)

== Gallery ==
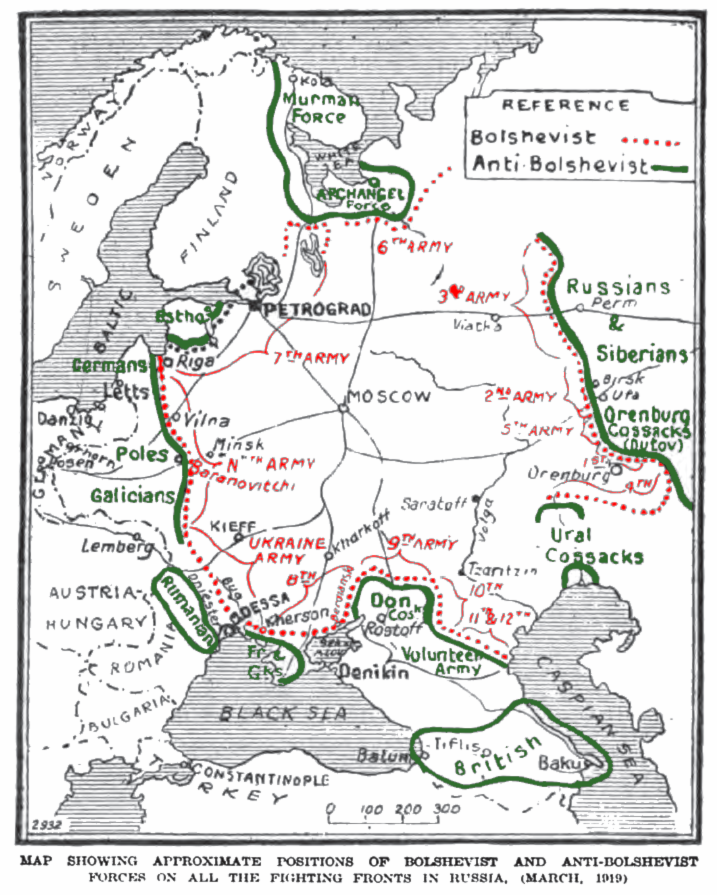
Military map of March 1919 after the Armistice of Mudros

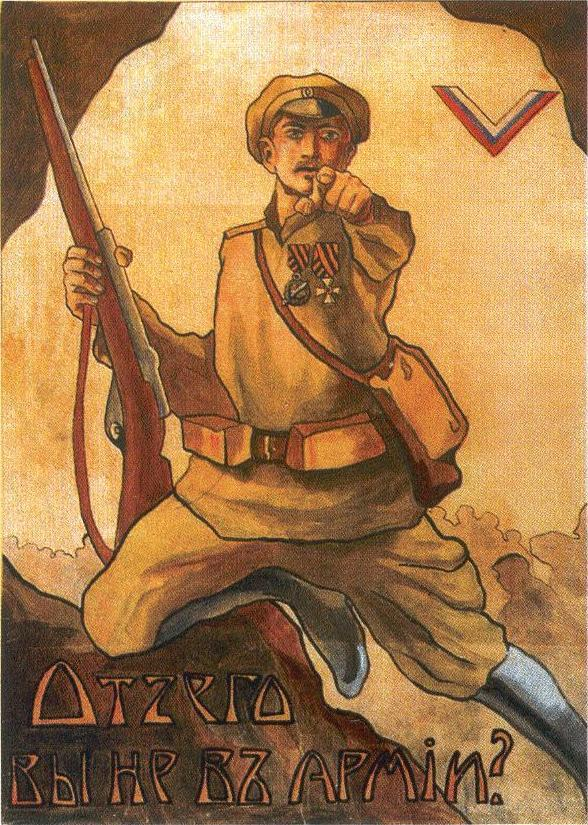
Volunteer Army recruitment poster saying "Why are you not in the army?"

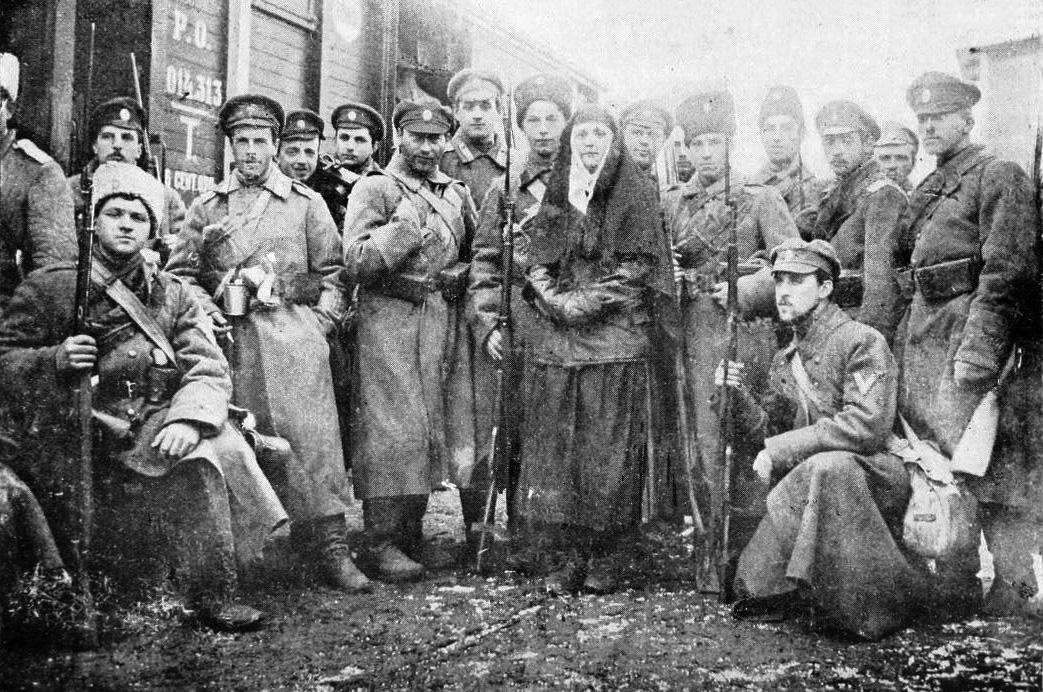
Volunteer Army soldiers and officers next to a train in January 1918

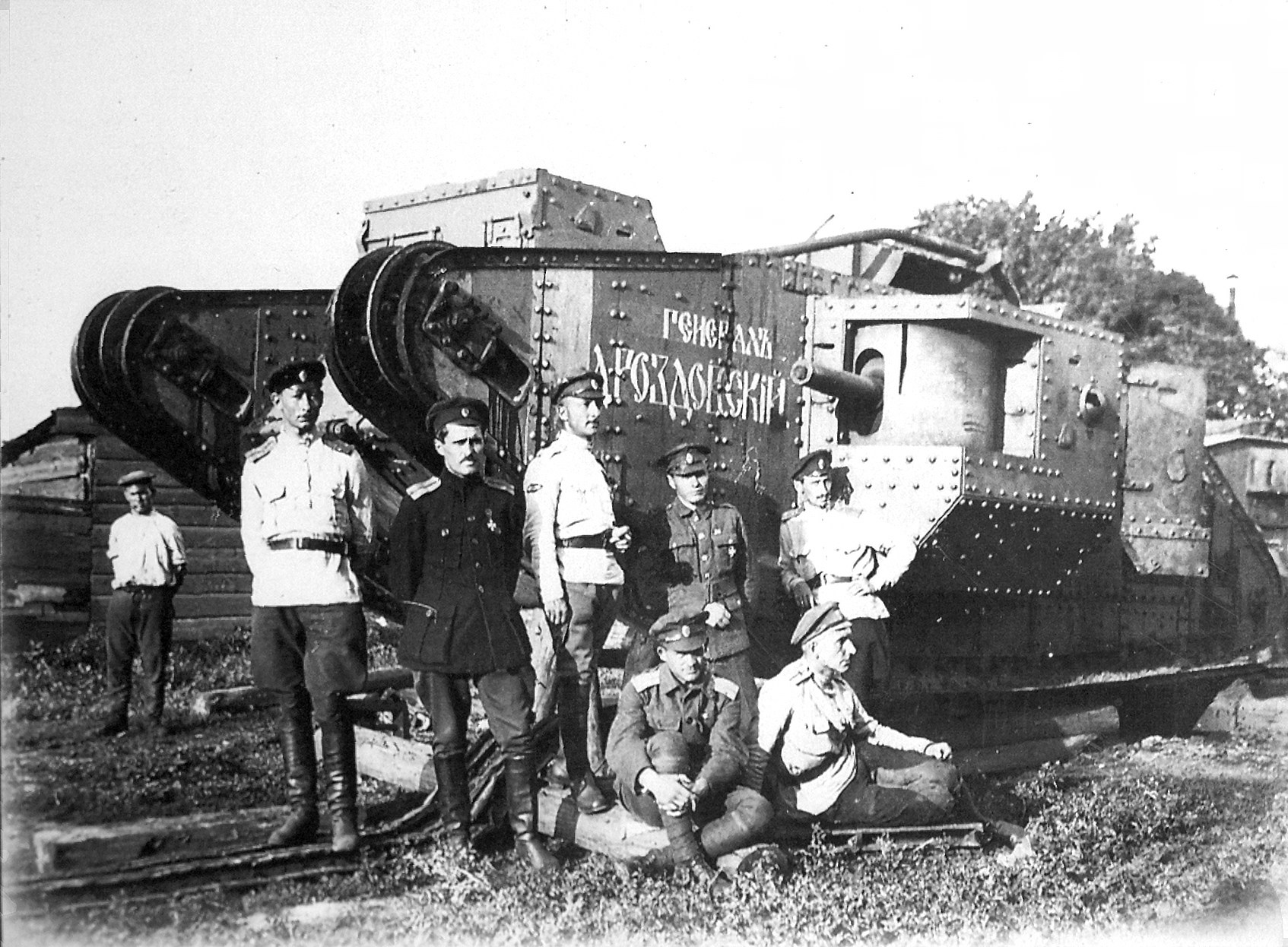
Volunteer Army Mark V tank named "General Drozdovsky" in 1919

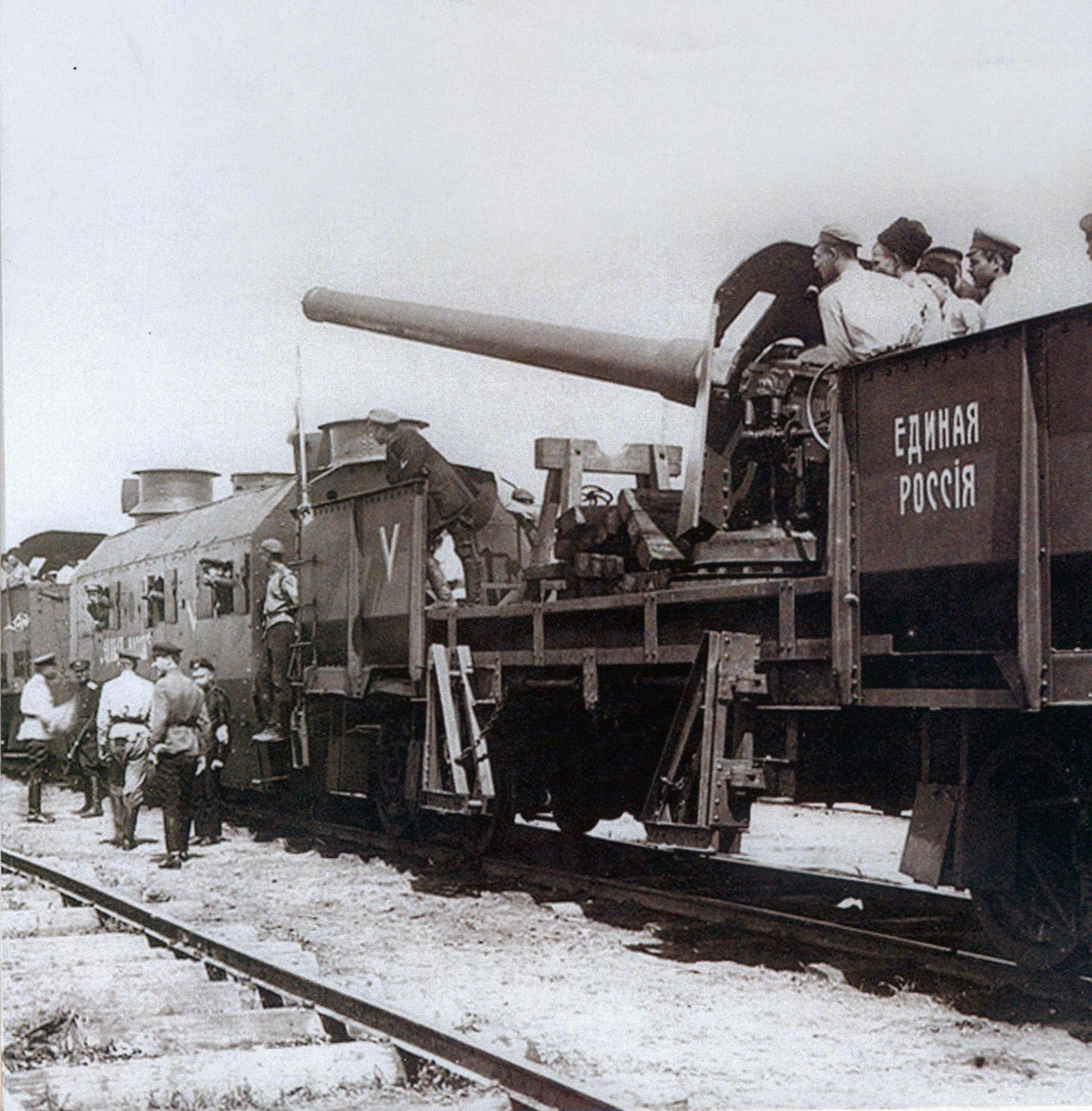
Volunteer Army armoured train "United Russia" on its way towards Tsaritsyn, June 1919

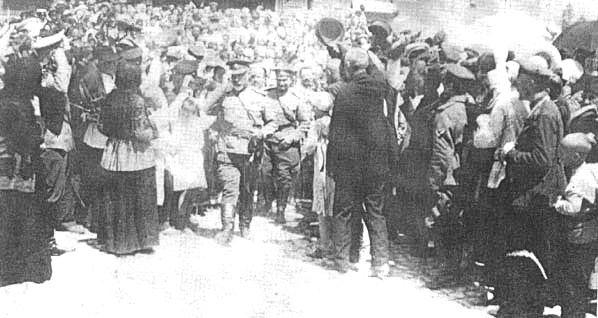
Local citizens welcome Denikin and officers to Tsaritsyn on 1 July 1919

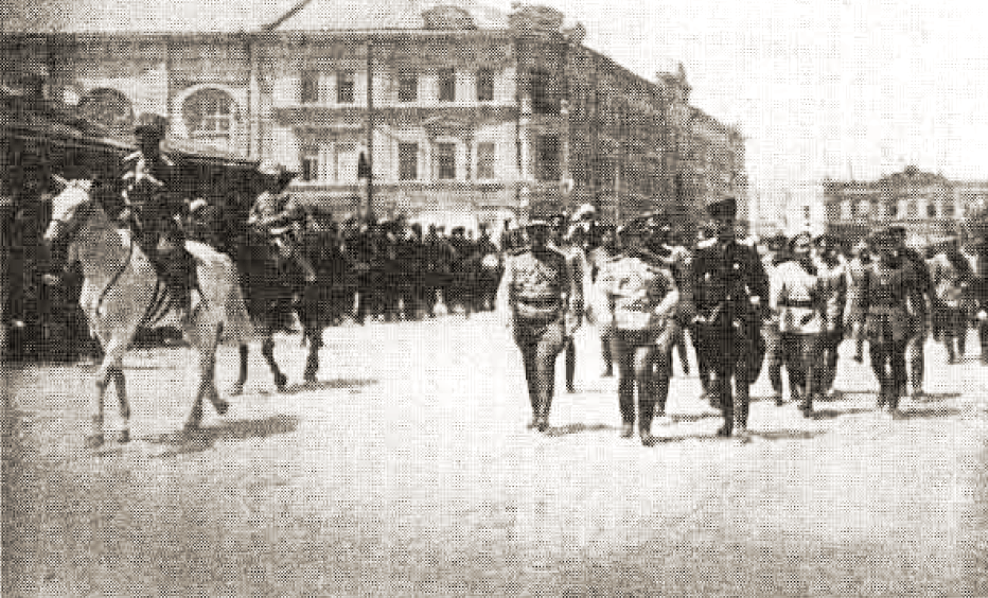
Denikin and Wrangel during an AFSR parade in Tsaritsyn in July 1919

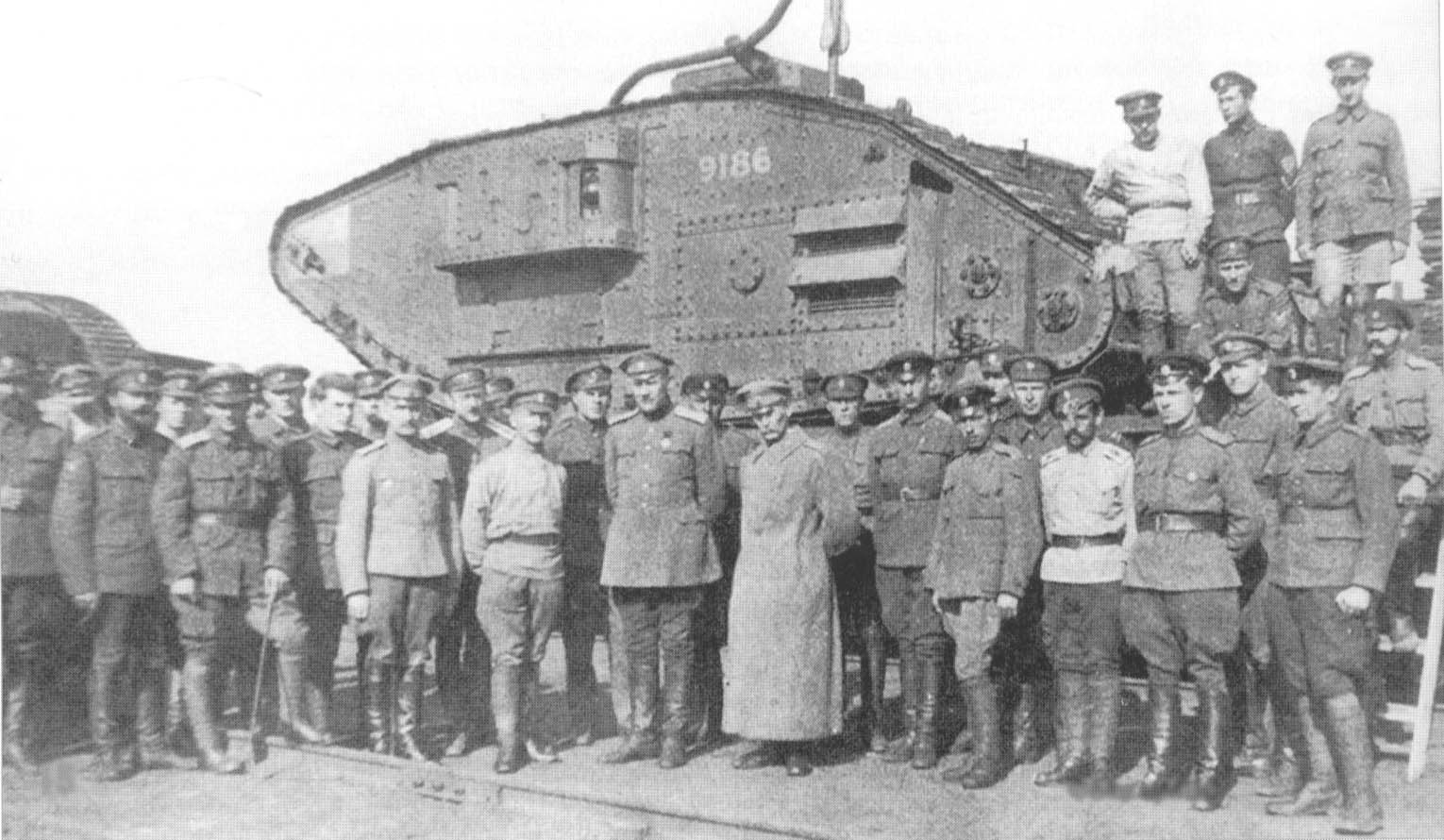
Don Army troops and Major General Vladimir Sidorin (center) with a Mark V tank in 1919

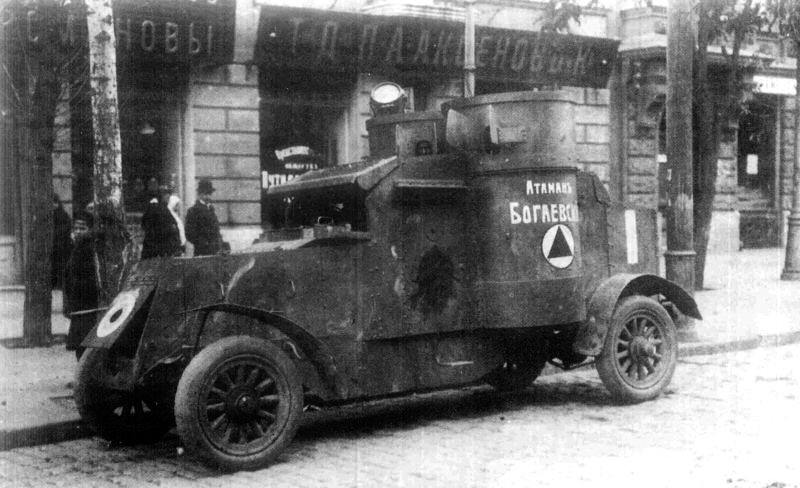
Don Army Austin Armoured Car named "Ataman Bogayevsky" in 1919

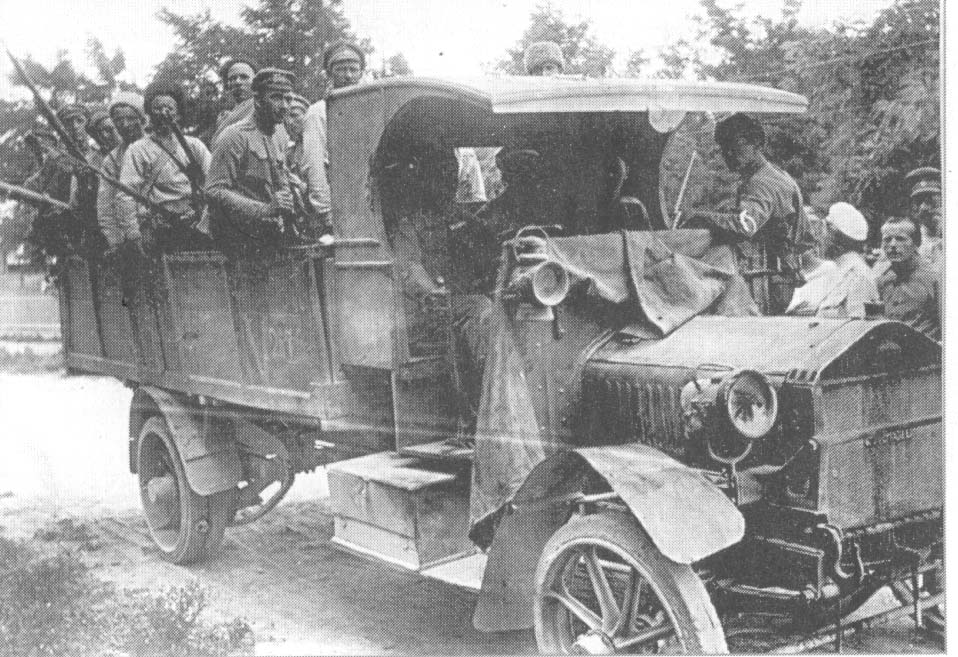
AFSR 2nd Infantry Division soldiers in Sochi, 1919

== See also ==
- Don Republic
- Government of South Russia (Wrangel)
- Kuban People's Republic
- South Russia (1919–1920)
- South Russian Government (Denikin)
