= Vasily Chernetsov =

White Russian partisan commander

Vasily Mikhailovich Chernetsov
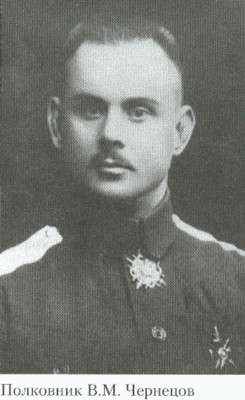
- Born: March 22, 1890; Don Host Oblast, Russian Empire
- Died: January 23, 1918 (aged 27); Don Host Oblast, Russia
- Military career
- Allegiance: Russian Empire; Don Republic; White movement
- Service years: 1909–1918
- Rank: Colonel
- Commands: Chernetsov's Partisans
- Conflicts: World War I; Eastern Front; Russian Civil War
- Awards: Order of St. Anna of 4th degree for bravery Order of St. Anna of 3rd degree Order of Saint Stanislaus of 3rd degree Order of Saint Stanislaus of 2nd degree Order of St. Vladimir of 4th degree * Golden St. George weapons "For bravery"

Vasily Mikhailovich Chernetsov (Russian: Василий Михайлович Чернецов; March 3, 1890 – January 23, 1918) was a Don Cossack Russian Imperial Army officer who served as a colonel in the Don Army during the Russian Civil War. He led Chernetsov's Partisans, an independent irregular military unit commissioned by ataman Alexey Kaledin on November 7, 1917.

== Awards ==
- Order of St. Anna of 4th degree
- Order of St. Anna of 3rd degree
- Order of Saint Stanislaus of 3rd degree
- Order of Saint Stanislaus of 2nd degree
- Order of St. Vladimir of 4th degree
- Gold Sword for Bravery

== Literature ==
The deaths of Colonel Chernetsov and his partisans at the hands of the Bolsheviks are part of the plot of the Mikhail Sholokhov novel And Quiet Flows the Don.
