= Berlin-Tegel Russian Orthodox Cemetery =

Cemetery in Berlin, Germany

Coordinates: 52°34′40″N 13°18′02″E

Friedhof der Russisch-Orthodoxen Gemeinde Berlin-Tegel
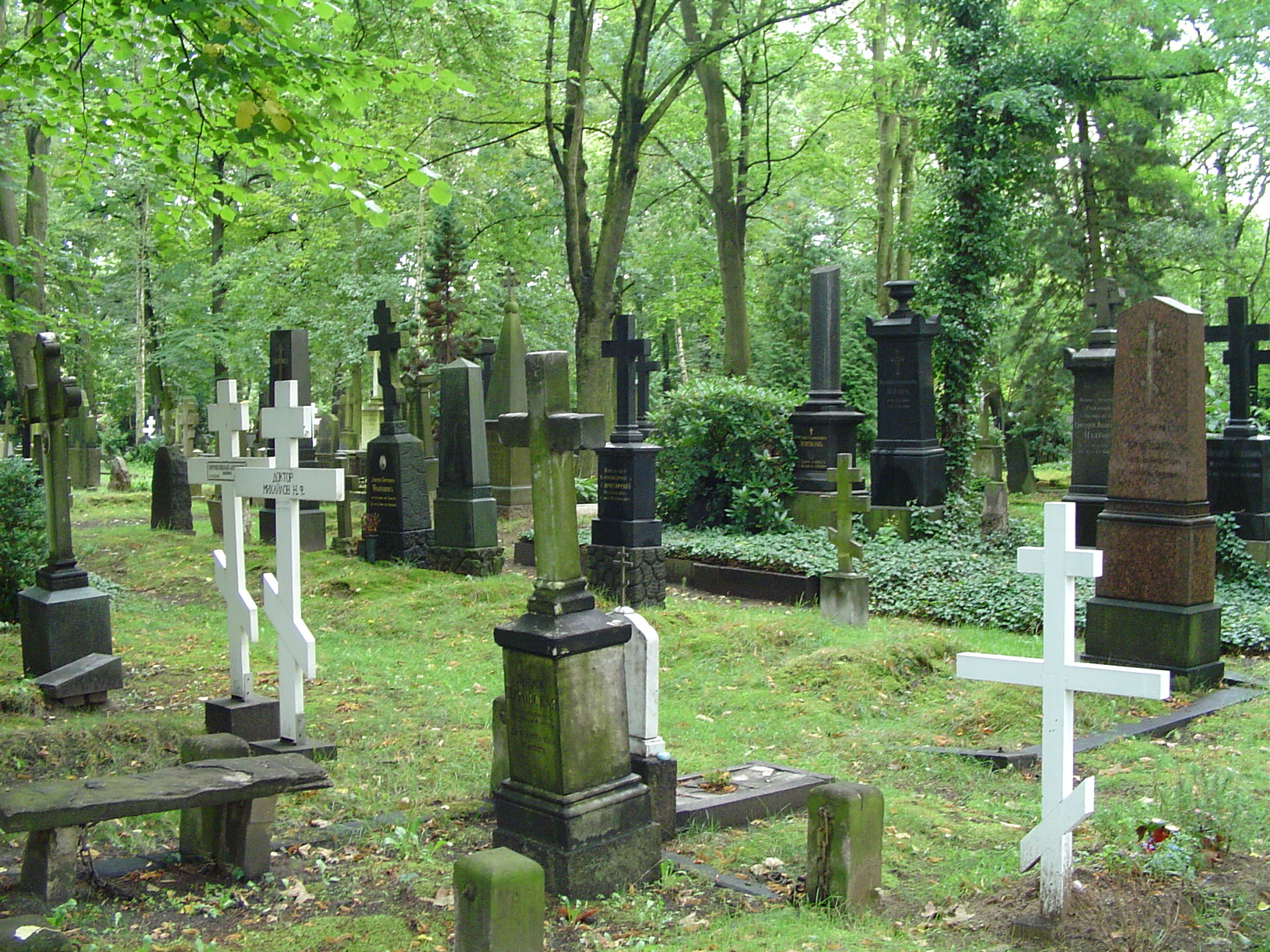
- Interactive map of Friedhof der Russisch-Orthodoxen Gemeinde Berlin-Tegel

Details
- Established: 1892
- Location: Berlin
- Country: Germany
- Type: Christian Orthodox cemetery

The Berlin-Tegel Russian Orthodox Cemetery (German: Russischer Friedhof Berlin-Tegel) is the only Russian Orthodox burial ground in Berlin. It is located on Witte street in the Tegel locality of the Reinickendorf borough. It is owned and operated by the Brotherhood of St. Prince Vladimir (Bratstvo).

== History and description ==
The cemetery at the Witte Road was established on about 2 acres of grounds that the Russian Orthodox Brotherhood of St. Prince Vladimir Bratstwo bought in October 1892 at a price of 30.000 marks. Until then, Orthodox Christians were primarily buried on existing mostly Protestant Berlin cemeteries.

The Friedhofskirche (cemetery church) of St. Constantine and St. Helena was built in 1894 and is the oldest of the three Russian Orthodox churches in Berlin, and the only one in Germany that has its own cemetery. It is situated in an industrial area near the motorway exit Holzhauser Straße. The gateway is covered by a beautiful carved roof, under which the nine cemetery bells are housed. The cupolas are crowned with orthodox crosses, which tower above small crescent moons in memory of old religious wars.

The church was designed and built by Albert Bohm, a member of the Prussian court architectural board. Two restored portraits of the Virgin Mary stand out under their icon ornamentation. They were donated by two monasteries on the sacred Mount Athos at the end of the nineteenth century.

When the cemetery was laid out, Tsar Alexander III sent 4.000 tons of earth from Russia, so that the Russian deceased could be buried according to tradition in native Russian soil.

== Notables buried ==
Among the notables buried here are

- Vladimir Dmitrievich Nabokov, Russian criminologist, journalist, and progressive statesman during the last years of the Russian Empire, and father of the writer Vladimir Vladimirovich Nabokov, who died saving a political rival from an assassin.
- Vladimir Sukhomlinov, Russian Minister of War (1909-1915)
- Vladimir Sidorin, Commander of the White Don Army (1919-1920)
- The operatic composer Mikhail Ivanovich Glinka died in Berlin and is buried in St. Petersburg, but is remembered here with a memorial stone.
- The architect Mikhail Eisenstein, father of the film director Sergey Eisenstein, is also commemorated here.
- Alexander Rimski-Korsakov, a nephew of the composer of the same name, is also commemorated here.

== Gallery ==
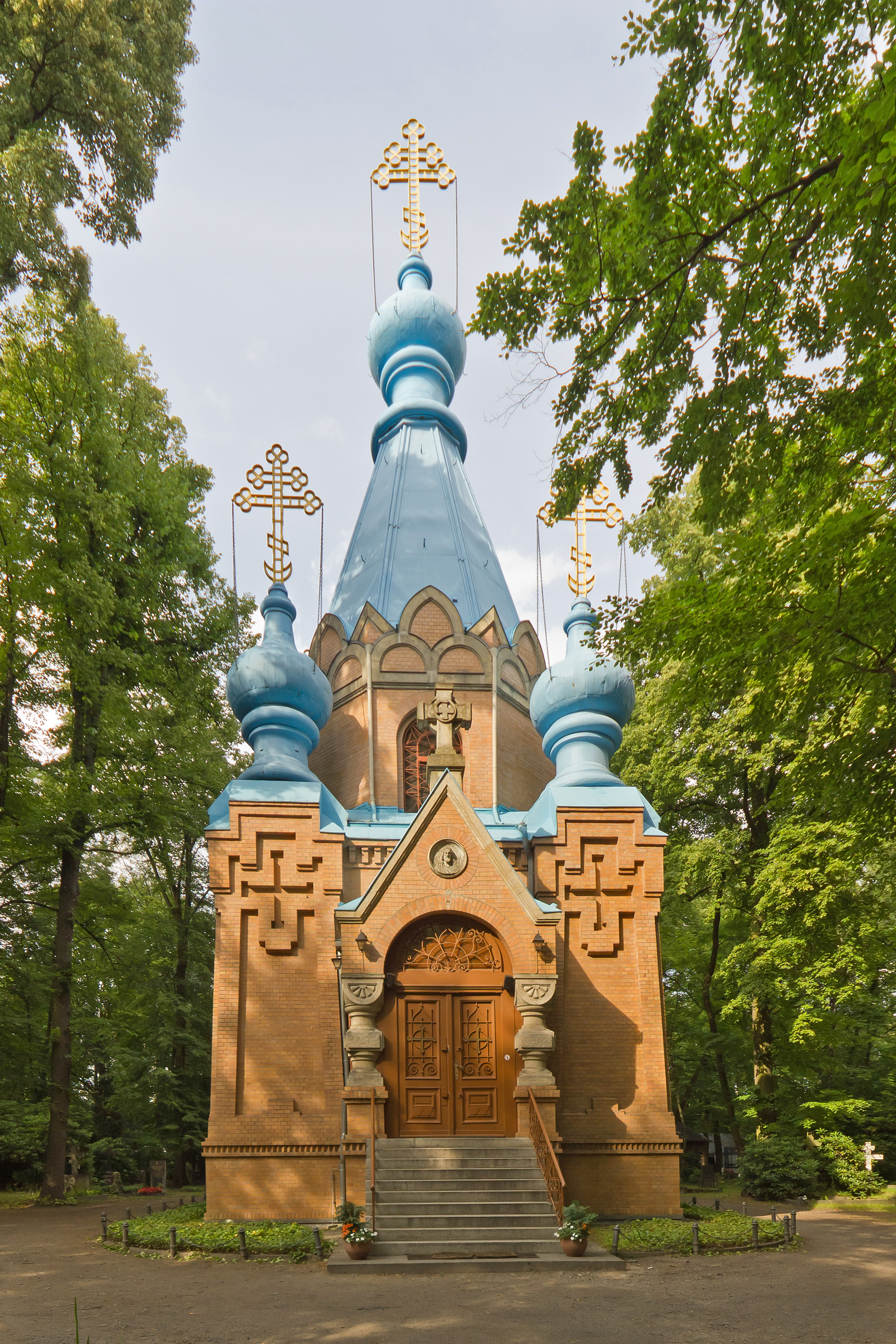

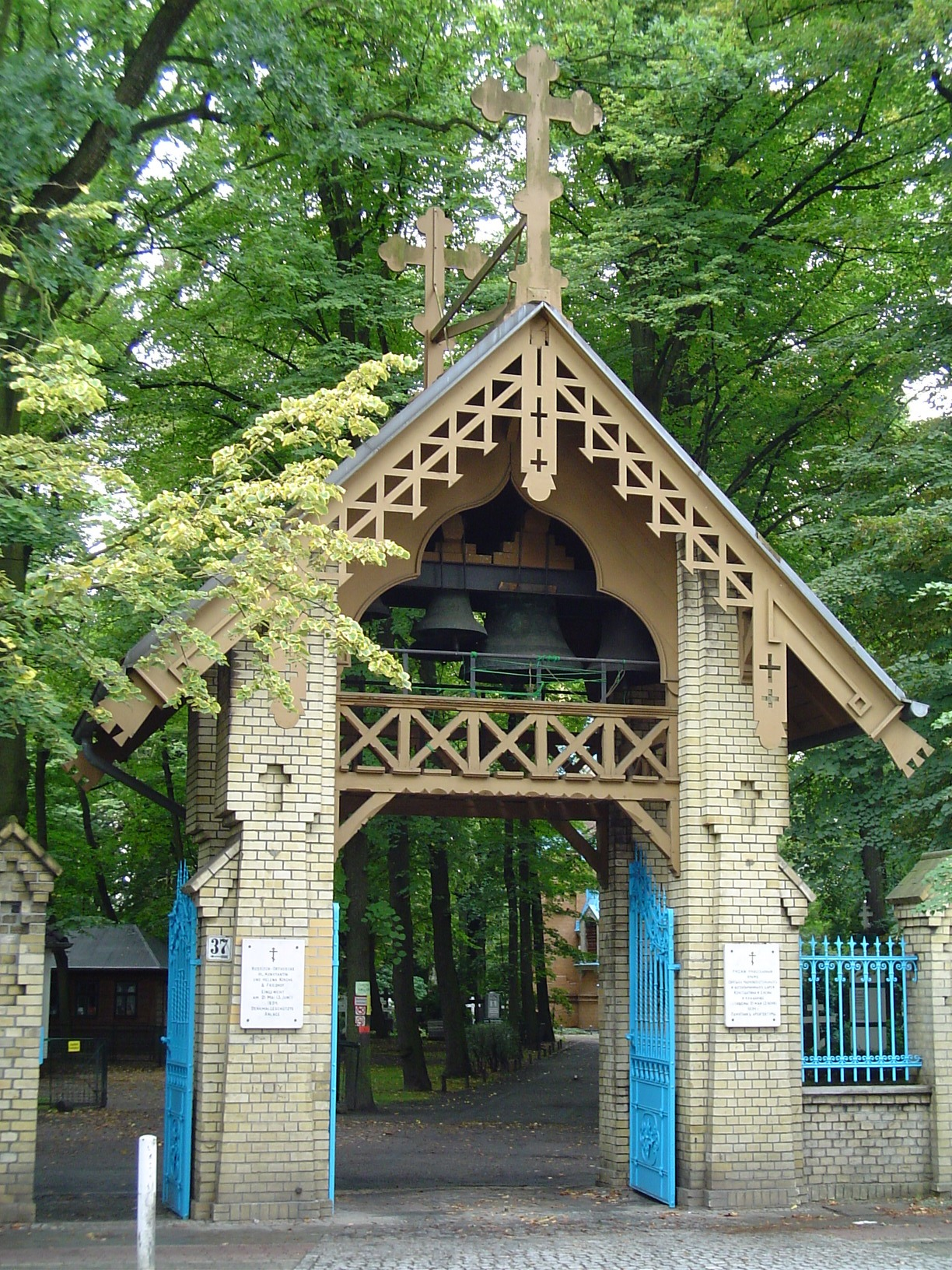

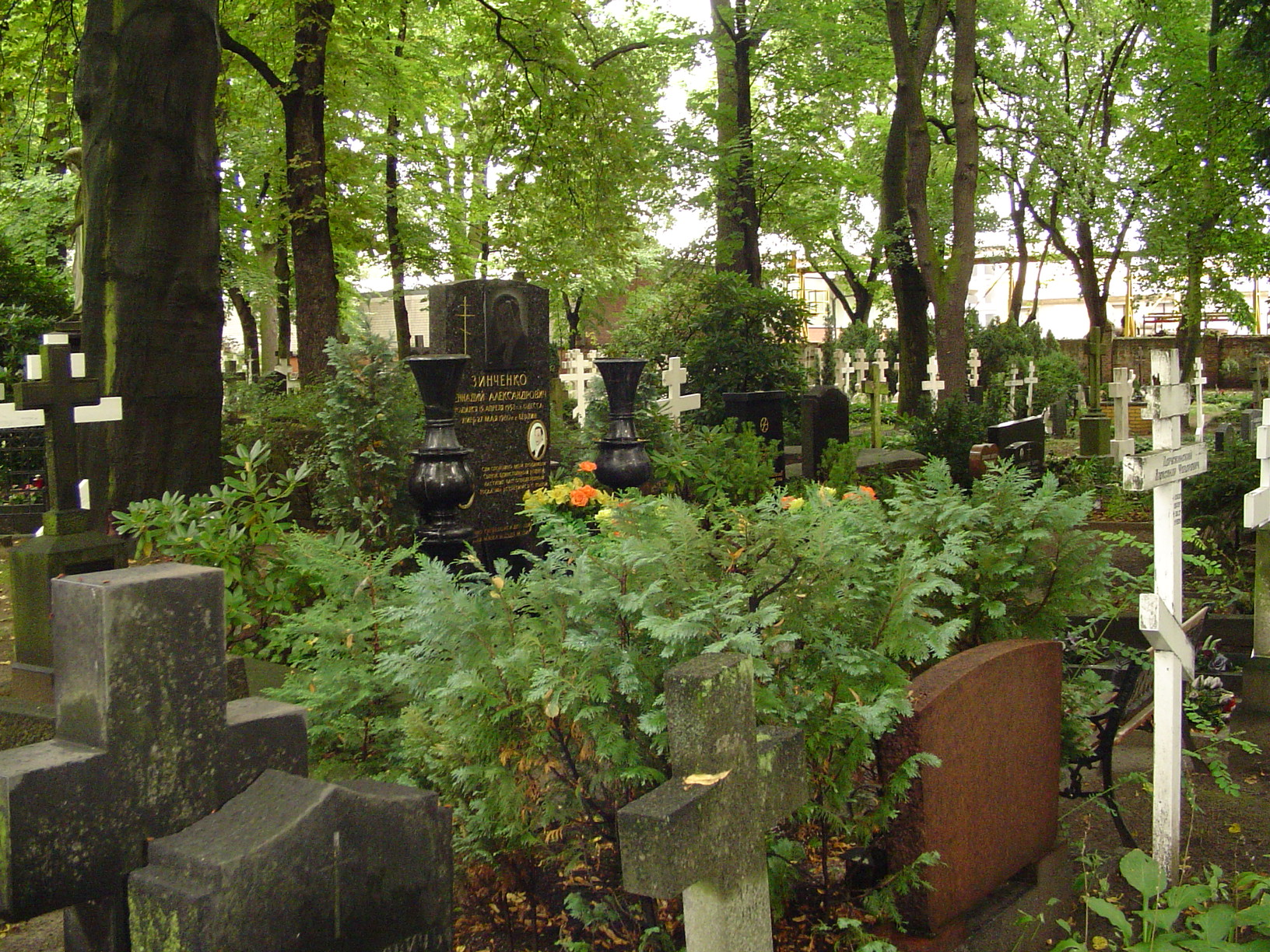
