= 2nd Army Corps (Armed Forces of South Russia) =

- Country: Russia
- Allegiance: (Russian Empire) White movement
- Branch: Armed Forces of South Russia
- Size: Corps
- Engagements: Russian Civil War Southern Front

The 2nd Army Corps (Russian: 2-й армейский корпус) was one of the main formations of the Armed Forces of South Russia (Russian: Вооружённых Сил Юга России, ВСЮР; VSUR) during the Russian Civil War.

== 1st Formation ==
The 2nd Corps was first formed on November 15, 1918, it included the 1st (until May 15, 1919) and the 3rd (until December 27, 1918) Infantry Divisions. From May 21, 1919, in consisted of the 5th and the 7th Infantry Divisions. On October 14, 1919, it was further reorganized to include the Composite Guards Division. From September 19, 1919, it was the basis for the Troops of the Kiev Region. They took part in the Bredov March to Poland. By March 2, 1920, the Corps consisted of the 5th Infantry Division and the Composite Guards Brigade. It was disbanded on August 5, 1920.

== 2nd Formation ==
The 2nd Corps was reformed in the Russian Army on April 16, 1920, on the basis of the Crimean Corps. It included the 13th and 34th Infantry Divisions and the 1st Cavalry Division. The 1st Cavalry Division was transferred to the Cavalry Corps on July 7, 1920. By August 8, 1920, the 1st Cavalry Brigade was added to the Corps. The Corps itself was put under the Command of the 2nd Army on September 4, 1920, and the Corps' composition included the 13th and 34th Infantry Divisions, the Combined Guards Regiment, and after General Wangles failed Taurida Offensive the 6th Infantry Division from the disbanded 3rd Corps.

== Commanders ==
- Alexandre Borovski
- Vladimir May-Mayevsky (1st formation)
- Mikhail Promtov
- Yakov Slashchov (2nd formation)
- Vladimir Vitkovsky (2nd formation)

== Chiefs of Staff ==
- Arvid Conrad Appelgren
- Vladimir Agapiejev
- Vladimir Galkin
- Fyodor Bredov
