= Vladimir Sidorin =

Russian Imperial army officer (1882–1943)

Vladimir Ilyich Sidorin
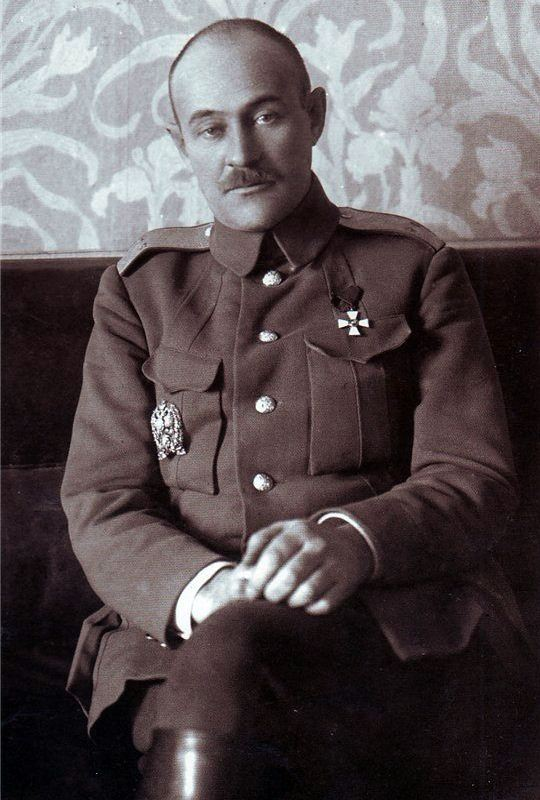
- Native name: Владимир Ильич Сидорин
- Born: 3 February 1882; Don Host Oblast, Russian Empire
- Died: 20 May 1943 (aged 61) Berlin, Nazi Germany
- Buried: Berlin-Tegel Russian Orthodox Cemetery
- Allegiance: Russian Empire; Don Republic
- Branch: Imperial Russian Army; Don Army
- Conflicts: Russo-Japanese War; World War I; Eastern Front (World War I); Battle of Galicia; Brusilov Offensive; Russian Civil War; Southern Front of the Russian Civil War; Battle of Tsaritsyn; Battle for the Donbas (1919); Ice March; Evacuation of the Crimea

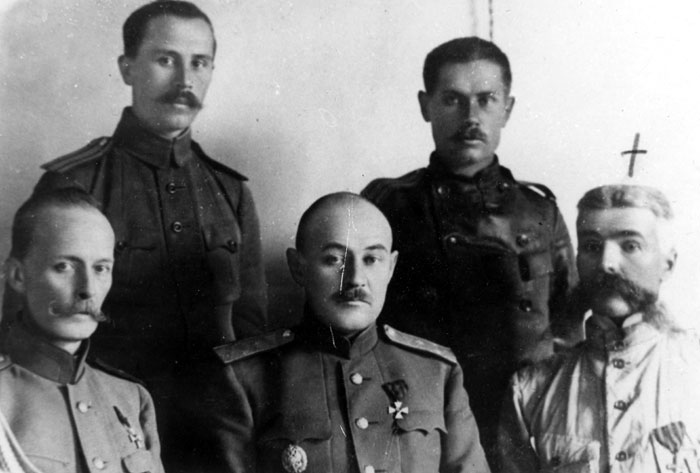
Don Army commanders for left to right : standing : Grigory Kislov and Vladimir Dobrynin. Sitting : Anatoliy Keltchevski, Vladimir Sidorin and Lieutenant-General Konstantin Mamontov. (The cross over Mamontov's head was drawn by the photographer after he died.)

Vladimir Ilyich Sidorin (Russian: Владимир Ильич Сидорин; 3 February 1882 − 20 May 1943) was an officer in the Imperial Russian Army and Commander of the Don Army between February 1919 and April 1920 during the Russian Civil War.

== Biography ==
He was born in the village of Esaulovskaya in the 2nd Don district of the Don Cossack Oblast. His father was Ilya Sidorin, an officer of the Don Army and his uncle was General Leonty Sidorin, shot by the Bolsheviks in February 1918.

Vladimir Sidorin participated in the Russo-Japanese War of 1904−1905. From 26 November 1912 to 1914 he was senior adjutant of the headquarters of the 3rd Caucasus Army Corps. During the First World War, he first served as an officer at the headquarters of the 21st Infantry Division. In 1915 he became Chief of staff of the 2nd militia division, and from 12 July of the 102nd Infantry Division. He was Deputy Chief of Staff of the Second Army from March 1916 to March 1917 and Chief of Staff of the 3rd Caucasus Army Corps from April to June 1917, when he was put at the disposal of the Chief of Staff of the Western Front. After the October Revolution, he returned to the Don and took part in the White movement.

First he joined the Cossack detachment of Novocherkassk and participated in the battle for Rostov in November−December 1917. Then he became Chief of Staff of the Don Cossack Army, under command of General Anatoly Nazarov. Later he was also Chief of Staff under General Pyotr Popov (25 April − 18 May 1918), when he took part in the Steppe March. From 12 May 1918 to 2 February 1919 he was in the reserve of the Don Army.

In February 1919 he succeeded Denisov as Commander of the Don Army, within the Armed Forces of South Russia. He held the post until 27 March 1920, when the Don Army was renamed the Don Corps, of which he also became commander.

After conducting many battles against the Red Army, he participated in the disastrous Evacuation of Novorossiysk. On 18 April 1920, shortly after his arrival from Novorossiysk to Evpatoria in the Crimea, he was brought to trial along with Lieutenant-General Kelchevsky, chief of staff of the Don Army. He was charged for separatist speeches, his support for the striving of the Don Cossacks to separate the Don from Russia and the spontaneous withdrawal of the Don Corps to Novorossiysk in the winter of 1919−1920. The court, chaired by General Abram Dragomirov, sentenced the generals Sidorin and Kelchevsky to four years of hard labor. General Pyotr Wrangel replaced the verdict with dismissal from the Russian Army without the right to wear a uniform.

== Emigration ==
General Sidorin was appointed Governor of Sevastopol (Russia) but emigrated from the Crimea one month later in May 1920 and went into exile: first in Bulgaria, then Serbia, then Czechoslovakia in 1924 and finally in Germany in 1939. In Prague he served in the cartographic department of the General Staff of the Czechoslovak Army. Together with General Starikov, he co-wrote numerous articles on the history of the Don Army during the Civil War. These articles were regularly published in the journal "Free Cossacks" (1936-1938) published in Paris by IA Bily. Under the title "The tragedy of the Cossacks", these articles were published in a separate book in four parts in 1936-1938 in Paris (without mentioning the names of the authors).

At the beginning of the World War II, Sidorin left for Germany. He died in Berlin on 20 May 1943 and was buried in the Berlin-Tegel Russian Orthodox Cemetery (4th quarter, 12th row, grave No. 18).
