= Vladimir Gittis =

Soviet military commander

Vladimir Mikhailovich Gittis
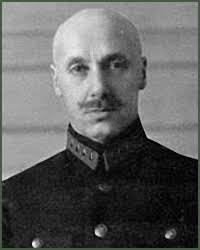
- Born: 24 June 1881; Saint Petersburg, Russian Empire
- Died: 22 August 1938 (aged 57) Moscow, Soviet Union
- Allegiance: Russian Empire; Soviet Union
- Branch: Imperial Russian Army; Soviet Red Army
- Service years: 1915–1917 (Russian Empire); 1918–1937 (Soviet Union)
- Commands: 8th Army (RSFSR); Western Front (RSFSR); Caucasian Front (RSFSR); Leningrad Military District
- Conflicts: World War I Russian Civil War

Vladimir Mikhailovich Gittis (Russian: Владимир Михайлович Гиттис; 24 June 1881 – 22 August 1938) was a Soviet military commander and komkor. He fought in the Imperial Russian Army during World War I before going over to the Bolsheviks during the subsequent Civil War. He was a recipient of the Order of the Red Banner (1919). He commanded the forces in Leningrad following the end of the civil war. During the Great Purge, he was arrested on 28 November 1937. His name appeared on the death list of 20 August 1938 which was signed by Joseph Stalin and Vyacheslav Molotov. He was convicted that day by the Military Collegium of the Supreme Court of the Soviet Union of espionage and sentenced to death. He was executed two days later at Kommunarka.

== Awards ==
- Order of St. George, 4th degree (1915)
- Order of Saint Vladimir, 4th class (1915)
- Order of Saint Anna, 2nd class (1915)
- Order of Saint Stanislaus (House of Romanov), 2nd class (1915)

Preceded by Alexander Yegorov	Commander of the Leningrad Military District; 1921–1925	Succeeded by Boris Shaposhnikov

== Bibliography ==
- Ленин В. И. Телеграмма В. М. Гиттису. 23.XI.1918 г. — Полн. собр. соч. Изд. 5-е. Т. 50, с. 210–211.
- Черушев Н. С.; Черушев Ю. Н. (2012), Расстрелянная элита РККА (командармы 1-го и 2-го рангов, комкоры, комдивы и им равные): 1937—1941. Биографический словарь [Shot elite of the Red Army (commanders of the 1st and 2nd ranks, comkors, divisional commanders and their equal): 1937-1941. Biographical Dictionary], Moscow: Kuchkovo field; Metropolis [Кучково поле; Мегаполис], pp. 70–71, ISBN 978-5-9950-0217-8

== Sources ==
- "Vladimir Gittis" (in Russian). «Russian army in a Great war» project.
- Гиттис Владимир Михайлович
