= Konstantin Mamontov =

Russian soldier

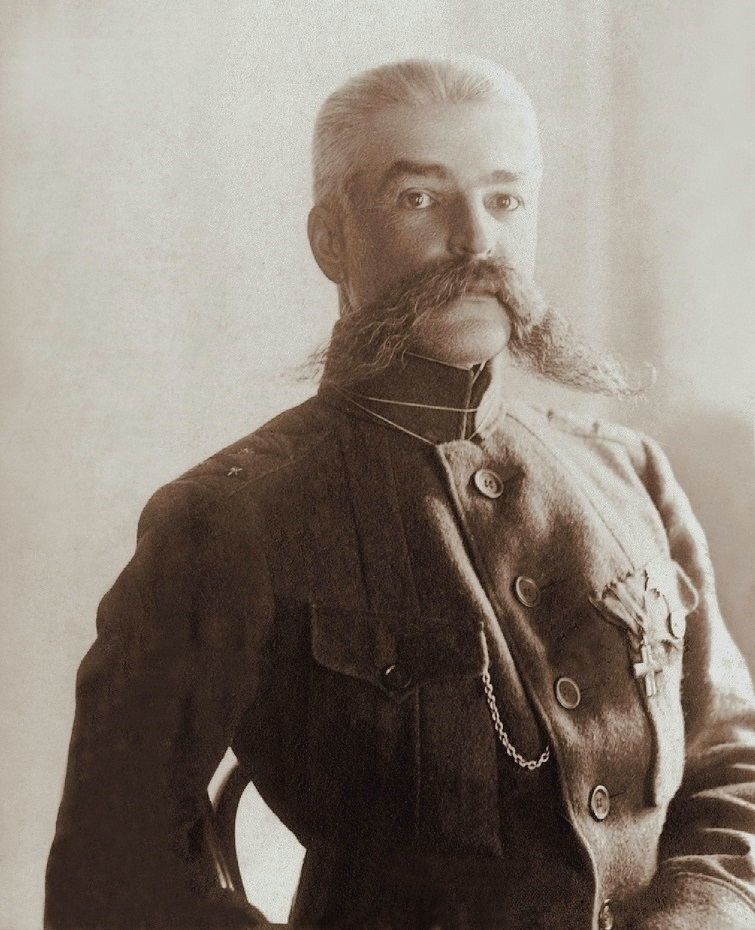
- Native name: Константин Константинович Мамантов
- Born: Konstantin Mamantov; 16 October 1869; Saint Petersburg, Russian Empire
- Died: 1 February 1920 (aged 50) Yekaterinodar
- Allegiance: Russian Empire; Don Republic (White Movement)
- Branch: (Russian Empire) Imperial Russian Army; (Don Republic) Don Army (White Movement)
- Service years: 1888–1917; 1918–1920
- Rank: Lieutenant general
- Commands: 6th Don Cossack Division; Tsaritsyn Cavalry Group; 4th Don Cavalry Corps
- Conflicts: Russo-Japanese War; World War I; Russian Civil War
- Awards: Order of Saint Anna 2nd, 3rd, and 4th class; Order of Saint Stanislaus 2nd and 3rd class

Konstantin Konstantinovich Mamontov (Russian: Константин Константинович Мамонтов; 16 October 1869 – 14 February 1920) was a Russian military commander and famous general of the Don Cossacks, who fought in the White Army during the Russian Civil War.

== Biography ==
Mamontov was born in 1869 in Saint Petersburg. After being in a school cadet in the Nicholas Military Academy, he was a student of the prestigious Nicholas Cavalry College in St. Petersburg graduating in 1890, when he joined the regiment of mounted grenadiers of the Imperial Guard as a cornet.

In 1893, he joined the Dragoons Kharkov. From 1899, he commanded the Third Regiment of Cossacks of the Don. In 1904, he participated actively in the Russo-Japanese War as an officer of the First Chita Regiment, part of the Transbaikal Cossack army. On 24 August 1912 he was promoted colonel. During the First World War he was from July to April 1915 commander of the Nineteenth Don Cossack Regiment, on 8 April 1915 to April 1917 Commander of the Sixth regiment of Don Cossacks, and after his promotion to major general from April 1917 to January 1918 Commander of the 6th Don Cossack Division.

== The Civil War ==
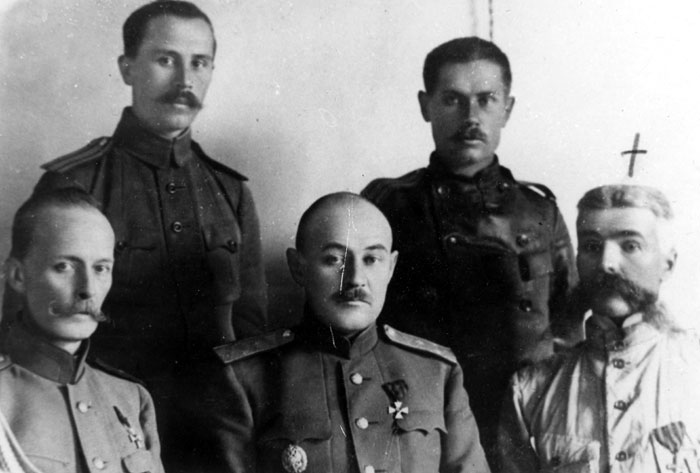
Don Army commanders including Lieutenant-General Konstantin Mamontov on the right. (The cross over Mamontov's head was drawn by the photographer after he died.)

After the revolution and the collapse of the front General Mamontov and his men returned to their lands of the Don, the stanitsa Nizhne-Tchirskaia. Like most of the Cossacks he was an outspoken opponent of the Bolsheviks and joined at the first opportunity to form a partisan detachment which rallied at Novocherkassk crossing the Red lines.

On 12 February he joined the White Army, a loose confederation of Anti-Communist forces in the Campaign of the steppe. From July 1918 to 23 February 1919 he was commander of the eastern front of the Don Region, then the First Don Army.

He participated in the Battle of Tsaritsyn, and the Battle for the Donbas (1919). During the Southern Front counteroffensive, he raided the Bolshevik rear. According to Peter Kenez, "He captured major towns, including Tambov, but moved so quickly that the Bolsheviks could not catch up with him. He caused a great deal of harm; he interrupted communications between front line units and their staffs, blew up bridges, railroad lines, and ammunition dumps, and dispersed newly drafted Red units. Perhaps most important, he created panic and undermined morale."

After the personal order of Vladimir Lenin, they sent the best cavalry corps of the Red Army under the leadership of Budyonny against Mamontov's Corps, who succeeded in November 1919 after a very hard and bloody fighting in the Battles of Voronezh, Kastorensk and in the Kharkov operations at the end of 1919. These two offensives were directly connected with the Orel-Kursk operation in 1919 and were part of a broad military action in the Red Army counter-offensive in the southern front. Mamontov’s corps was routed by S. M. Budennyi’s cavalry corps at Kastornaia in November 1919. This defeat was crucial for the consolidation of the Bolshevik power and undermined the morale of the anti-Bolshevik forces. Mamontov was subsequently relieved of his command, but after a few days re-appointed to his post. Mamontov died on 14 February 1920 in Ekaterinodar of typhus.

== See also ==
- Don Army

== Literature ==
- Klaving, Valery (2003). Гражданская война в России: белые армии [The Russian Civil War: White Armies] (in Russian). Moscow: AST. ISBN 5-17-019260-6.
- Volkov, Sergey Vasilievich (2002). Белое движение. Энциклопедия гражданской войны [The White Movement: Encyclopedia of the Civil War] (in Russian). St. Petersburg: Neva, OLMA-Press. ISBN 5-224-04071-X.
