= Don Army =

- Донская армия
- Don Army insignia
- Active: 3 April 1918 – 24 March 1920
- Country: Don Republic
- Allegiance: (Russia) GCAFSR
- Branch: Armed Forces of South Russia
- Size: 17,000 (May 1918); 76,000 or 85,000 (December 1918); 52,500 (October 1919)); 38,000 (February 1920)
- Engagements: Russian Civil War: Southern Front; Battle of Tsaritsyn; Battle of the Donbass and Don (1919)

The Don Army (Russian: Донская армия, Donskaya Armiya) was the military of the short lived Don Republic and a part of the White movement in the Russian Civil War. It operated from 1918 to 1920, in the Don region and centered in the town of Novocherkassk.

== History ==
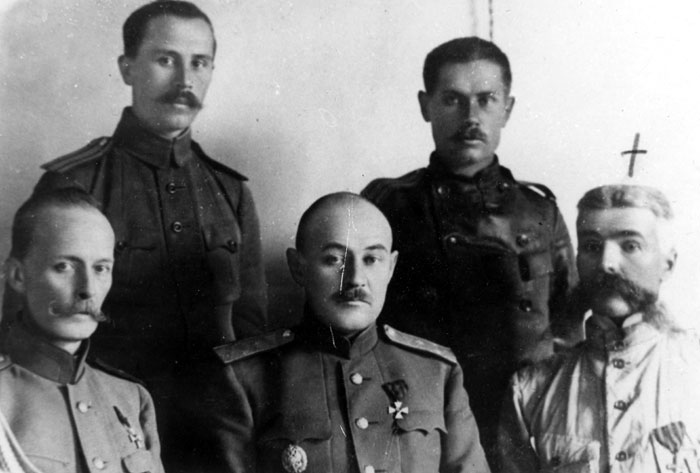
Don Army commanders. Back: Grigory Kislov, Vladimir Dobrynin. Front: Anatoliy Keltchevski, Vladimir Sidorin, Lt. Gen. Konstantin Mamontov. (After Mamontov died the photographer drew the cross above his head.)

On 23 April, K. S. Poliakov's Zaplavskaia army merged with Field Ataman Popov's forces after their return from the Steppe March. Popov assumed command, with K. S. Poliakov as Chief-of-Staff, and organized the Southern, Northern and Trans-Don army groups under Denisov, I. A. Poliakov, and Semiletov respectively. On 6 May, the Southern army group was able to capture Novocherkassk, with the aid of Mikhail Drozdovsky's men. In April 1918, before the liberation of Novocherkassk from Don Soviet Republic control, a Don Provisional Government was formed under G. P. Ianov. On 11 May, the "krug for the Salvation of the Don" opened, which organized the anti-Bolshevik war. On 16 May, Pyotr Krasnov was elected Ataman. The Don Republic ordered the mobilization of Cossacks for six years. By June, with Denisov as his second in command, Krasnov has able to double the size of the Cossack army to 40,000. According to Peter Kenez, "The Germans supplied an enormous amount of war material during the summer of 1918. The Germans covered the voisko from the west and the Volunteer Army from the south, and so Krasnov was able to concentrate movements in eastern and northern directions. By the end of August, with the exception of five stanitsy, the entire voisko was liberated."

Much of the Upper Don region, in 1918, had defected to the Bolsheviks, but as a result of the Red Terror, in 1919, rose up in arms against them, in what was known as the Veshenskaya Uprising. The main leaders were Pavel Nazarovich Kudinov and Kharlampii Yermakov. They joined forces with the Don Army centered in Novocherkassk, which was commanded by Ataman Afrikan Bogayevsky. These events form an important part of Mikhail Sholokhov's epic, And Quiet Flows the Don. Indeed, for a long time, Kudinov and Yermakov, who appear in the novel, were considered as fictional by the general public.

Kenez states, "The period from May to the end of July 1918 was one of uninterrupted successes for the Don army." By the end of July, the army consisted of 40,000 soldiers, and faced an equal number of Red troops. However, multiple attempts to capture Tsaritsyn in October, December, and January failed, as the Red Army grew in strength, and the Don Cossacks were reluctant to fight beyond their voisko boundaries.

In the Winter of 1918-1919, the Red Southern Front, including their Group Kozhevnikov, 8th Army, 9th Army, and 10th Army, counterattacked the Don Army and regained control of the area northeast of the Donets and Manych rivers.

The Don army was often divided and plagued with indecisiveness, many of the Cossacks not wishing to fight beyond their own territory.

In January 1919, the Armed Forces of South Russia were created, uniting the Don Army and Volunteer Army, with Anton Denikin as supreme commander. The Don Army participated in the Battle for the Donbas (1919), led by Vladimir Sidorin. According to Kenez, "However, by the beginning of February the position of the Cossacks was critical. As a result of heavy losses and defections, the size of the Don army was greatly reduced. The once mighty army numbered only fifteen thousand men." Under Sidorin's leadership, the Don army advanced northward, and made contact with the Cossack insurgents associated with the Vyoshenskaya Uprising. The Don Army then grew to forty thousand by 28 June.

In April 1920, after the evacuation to the Crimea, Wrangel organized the three-division strong Don corps, commanded by Sidorin, and later Abramov. According to Kenez, In spite of leaving thousands of Cossacks in Novocherkassk, this unit remained a substantial force." Yet, in November, Wrangel was forced to evacuate the Crimea.

== Commanders ==
- General-major K. S. Poliakov (3−12 April 1918)
- General-major Pyotr Popov (12 April − 5 May 1918)
- Lieutenant-general Svyatoslav Denisov (5 May 1918 − 2 February 1919)
- Lieutenant-general Vladimir Sidorin (2 February 1919 − 14 March 1920)

== Chief of Staff ==
- Colonel Svyatoslav Denisov (3−12 April 1918)
- Colonel Vladimir Sidorin (12 April − 5 May 1918)
- Colonel Ivan Poliakov (5 May 1918 − 2 February 1919)
- Lieutenant-general Anatoliy Keltchevski (2 February 1919 − 14 March 1920)
- General-major Nikolai Alekseyev (23 April − December 1920)

== Combat strength ==
Generally after Dobrynin, The Participation of the Don Cossacks in the Fight against Bolshevism.

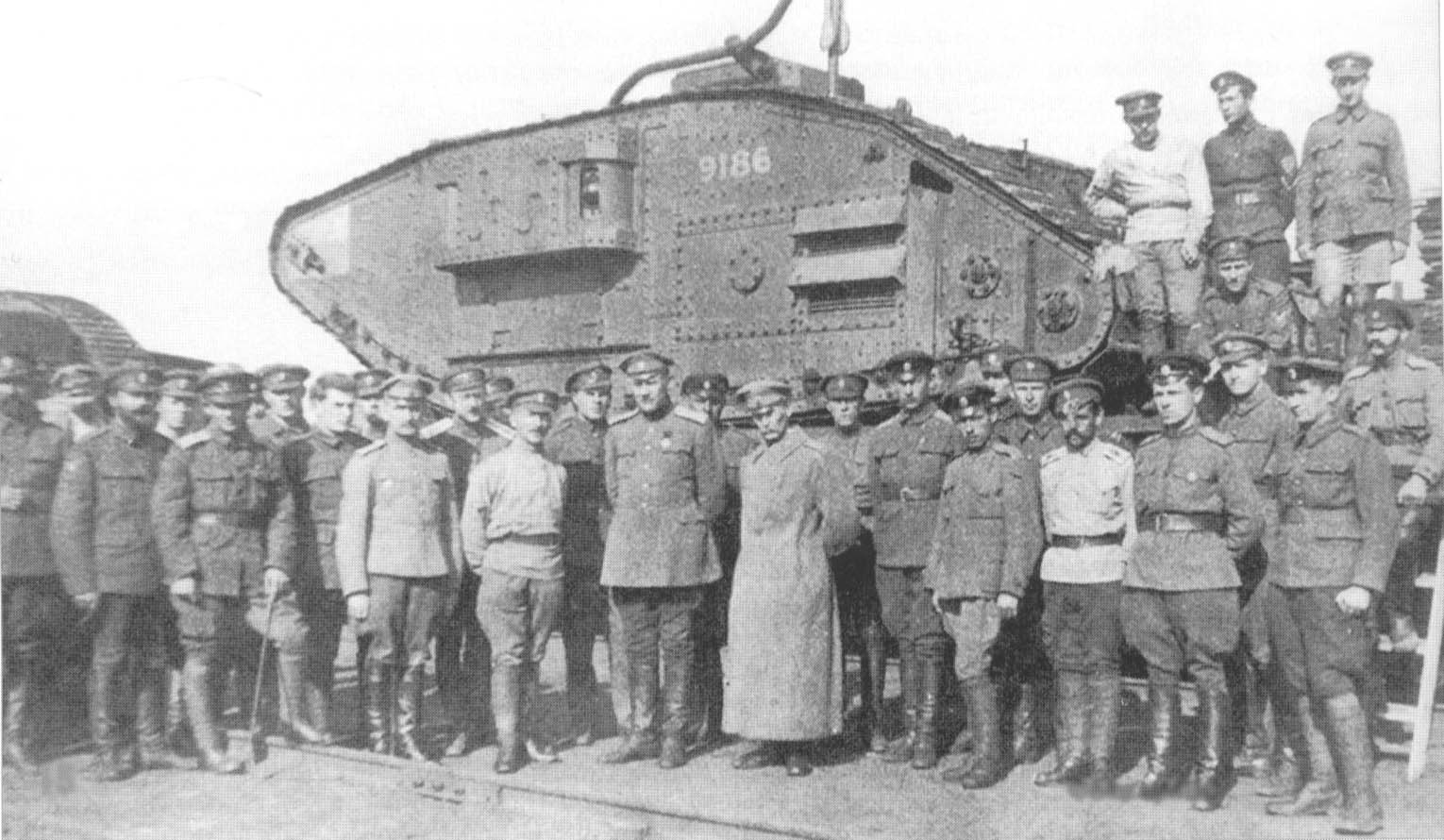
Soldiers of the Don Army in 1919 with a Mark V tank

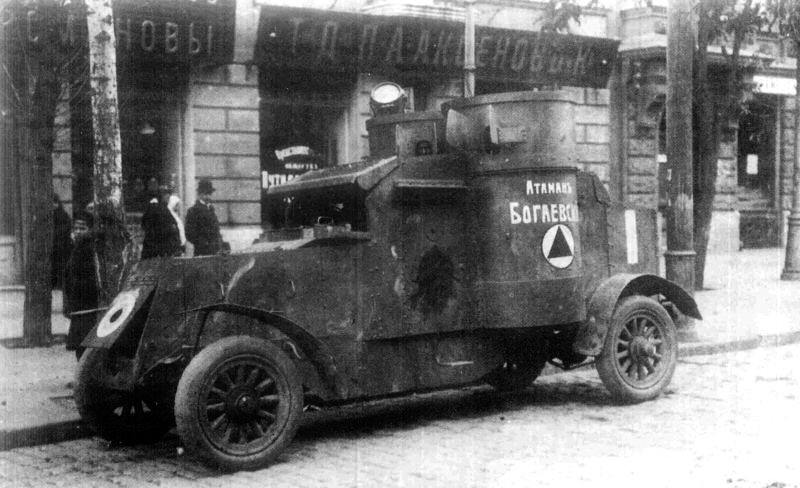
Austin Armoured Car with "Ataman Bogayevsky" written on the side

Date	Soldiers	Field Guns	Machine Guns
May 1, 1918	17,000	21	58
June 1, 1918	40,000	56	179
July 1, 1918	49,000	92	272
July 15, 1918	39,000	93	270
August 1, 1918	31,000	79	267
November 20, 1918	49,500	153	581
February 1, 1919	38,000	168	491
February 15, 1919	15,000	N/A	N/A
April 21, 1919	15,000	108	441
May 10, 1919	15,000	131	531
June 16, 1919	40,000	N/A	N/A
July 15, 1919	43,000	177	793
August 1, 1919	30,000	161	655
September 1, 1919	39,500	175	724
October 1, 1919	46,500	192	939
October 15, 1919	52,500	196	765
November 1, 1919	37,000	207	798
December 1, 1919	22,000	143	535
January 1, 1920	39,000	200	860
January 22, 1920	39,000	243	856
February 1, 1920	38,000	158	687

== In literature ==
The events of those years, especially those centered in the Upper Don, as well as events leading up to them, are the focus of Mikhail Sholokhov's epic, And Quiet Flows the Don.

== See also ==
- List of Don Army Units in the Civil War
- Don Republic
- Don Cossacks
- Alexei Kaledin
- Lavr Kornilov
- Pyotr Krasnov
- Volunteer Army
- White movement
- Steppe March
