= Colored military units =

White-aligned Russian Civil War units

Colored military units is a widespread unofficial name, which later became established in historiography and popular literature for the white regiments, brigades, and divisions of the 1st Infantry Division of the Volunteer Army and 1st Army Corps of the Volunteer Army during the Russian Civil War. The name comes from the specific colors of caps, shoulder marks, sleeve insignia and chevrons (red, black, crimson, blue) characteristic of each unit:

== Composition of "colored" units ==
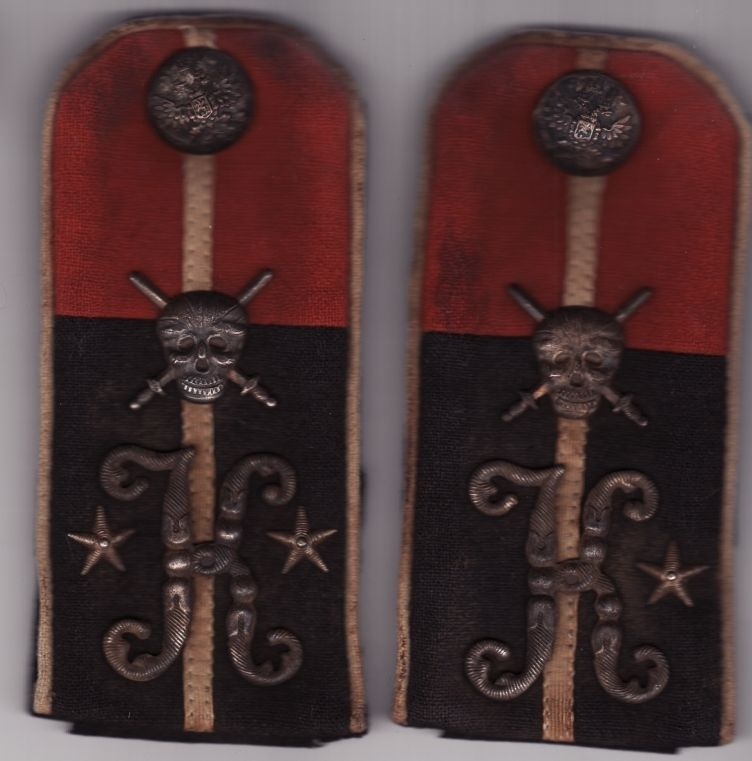
Shoulder marks of a Kornilov officer

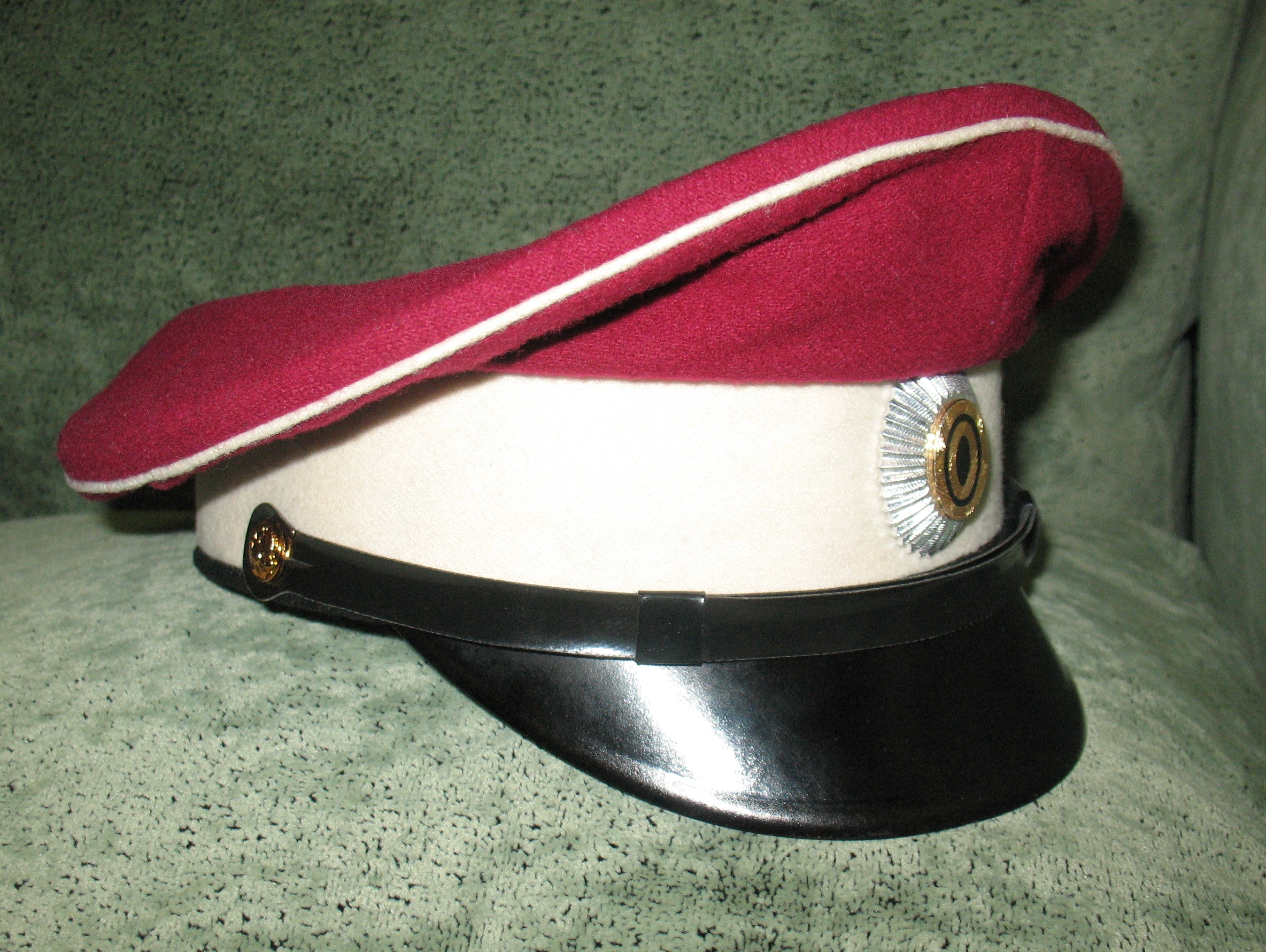
Cap of a volunteer Drozdov units.

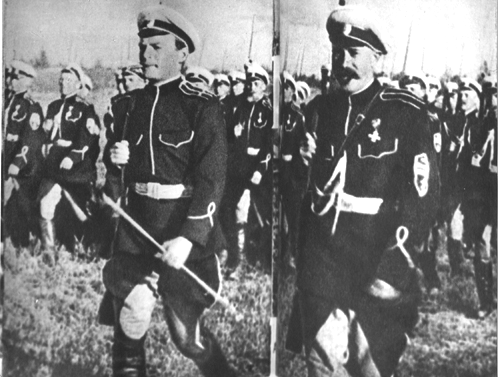
Psychic attack by kappelevtsy. Shot from the movie «Chapaev» (1934). They are dressed in black and white uniform of markovtsy.

- Kornilovtsy:
  - Kornilov Division
    - 1st Kornilov Shock Regiment
    - 2nd Kornilov Shock Regiment
    - 3rd Kornilov Shock Regiment
    - Kornilov Cavalry Division
    - Mountain Muslim Cavalry Division named after General Kornilov
    - Kornilov Artillery Brigade
- Drozdovtsy:
  - 3rd Infantry (Drozdov) Division
    - 1st Officer General Drozdov Regiment
    - 2nd Officer General Drozdov rifle regiment
    - 3rd Officer General Drozdov Regiment
    - Samur Infantry Regiment
    - 2nd Cavalry General Drozdov Regiment
    - Drozdov Artillery Brigade
- Markovtsy:
  - 1st Infantry (Markov) Division
    - 1st Officer General Markov Regiment
    - 2nd Officer General Markov Regiment
    - 3rd Officer General Markov Regiment
    - Markov Cavalry Division
    - Separate Cavalry General Markov Division
    - Markov Artillery Brigade
- Alekseevtsy:
  - Alekseev (partisan) Division
    - Alekseev Partisan Regiment
    - 2nd Alekseev Regiment
    - 3rd Alekseev Regiment
    - Alekseev Cavalry Partisan Regiment
    - Samur Infantry Regiment
    - Alekseev Artillery Brigade

== Regimental Colours ==
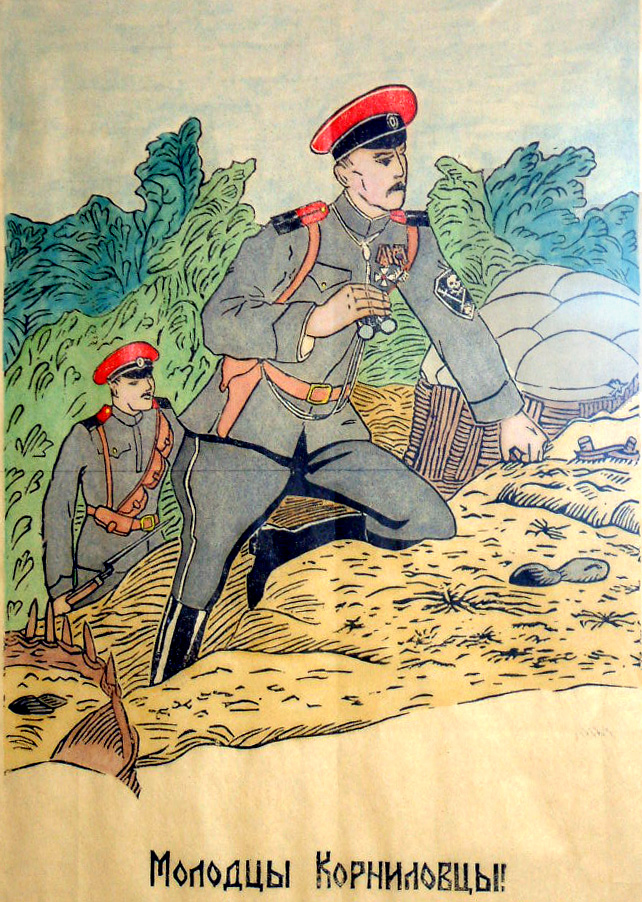
Image of Kornilovtsy uniform on the propaganda poster of the Kharkov branch of the OSVAG, 1919.

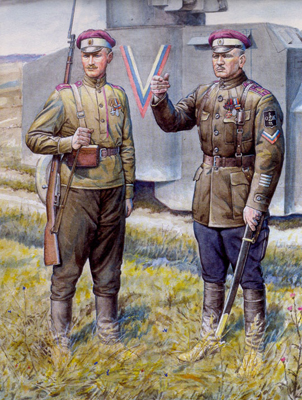
Image of the Drozdovtsy uniform

Lieutenant Colonel Pavlov in Markov uniform.

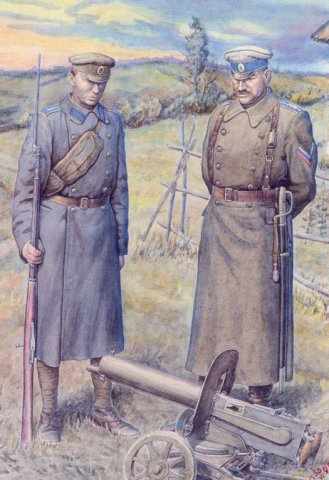
Image of the Alekseyevtsy uniform, 1919

Officers of the named regiments of the Volunteer Army did not wear gold or silver galloon officer shoulder marks, as in the Russian Imperial Army; instead, they used cloth shoulder marks with the same number of stars and gaps corresponding to the rank. Only experienced volunteers who had participated in the Kuban campaigns had the right to wear colored shoulder marks. The remaining officers, who had transferred from the Red Army or joined the army in newly liberated areas, initially wore ordinary protective shoulder marks, and only after a long time were they honored to put on colored shoulder marks.

Each regiment had a cap and shoulder marks of a certain color. On the shoulder marks were monograms of the capital letter of the regiment chief's surname.

- Kornilovtsy:

— a black and red cap (crown and band) — in 1917 and red and black in 1918 and after, and black and red shoulder marks (the upper half is black, the lower half is red) with a white letter «K». The colors meant «Death or Freedom». The colors were chosen back in the First World War and symbolized freedom (red) and the unwillingness to live if Russia perished (black). They corresponded to the Kornilov banner, that is, each Kornilovite carried a part of the banner on his uniform. On the left sleeve, there was a blue chevron in the shape of a shield with the white inscription kornilovtsy and a white skull over crossed bones and swords (point down). At the bottom of the chevron is a red grenade, as a symbol of the continuity of the grenadier units.
The artillerymen of the Kornilov units had caps with a green crown and a black band. The artillerymen wore black shoulder marks with yellow crossed cannons and the letter K.

- Markovtsy:

— a black and white cap (white crown and black band) and black shoulder marks with white piping, with a white letter M (all with white piping). The black color symbolized the current state of Russia (mourning for Russia), and white – the hope for its resurrection.
Markov artillerymen wore caps with a white crown and black band and black shoulder marks with a white letter M (all with red piping).

- Drozdovtsy:

— a crimson-white cap (crimson crown and white band) and crimson shoulder marks with a yellow letter D. The crimson color symbolized the reflection of the battles and fires of their famous campaign from Iasi to the Don. According to another version, crimson was previously the color of the rifle units of the imperial army and was used by the drozdovites as their legal successors. The Drozdov infantry and cavalrymen wore crimson shoulder marks with black and white piping, while the Drozdov artillerymen wore black.
Artillerymen of Drozdov's units wore caps with a crimson crown and a black band and red shoulder marks with a yellow letter D.

- Alekseevtsy:

— a cap with a white crown, light blue band, and light blue shoulder marks with a white letter A. The light blue and white colors of the Alekseevtsy uniform symbolized the youth of the cadets, schoolmen, and students who followed the call of General Alekseyev, who joined the White struggle to save Russia. Blue was the color of the uniform of educational institutions, and the Alekseev Regiment was formed in 1918, including young students and high school students.
Artillerymen of the Alekseev units wore caps with a white crown, black band, and black shoulder marks with a yellow letter A.

All ranks had a chevron of Russian national colors sewn on their left sleeve, angled down, introduced in the Volunteer Army on January 10, 1918, for all military personnel.

All named units of the Volunteer Army remembered their commanders and honored their memory, which was reflected in their behavior. Even Soviet literature could not help but note this:

…drozdovtsy have irony in their faces, they like to wear pince-nez – in honor of their late boss; kornilovtsy have a traditionally rotten look and a disdainful disappointment on their faces; markovtsy show off their dirty overcoats and swear.

— Tolstoy A.N., «The Road to Calvary» (book 3) Gloomy Morning

== Coloring table ==
Military unit	Crown of cap	Band of cap	Shoulder marks	Edging of shoulder marks
Kornilovtsy				—
Kornilovtsy (artillerymen)				—
Markovtsy				
Markovtsy (artillerymen)				
Drozdovtsy				
Drozdovtsy (artillerymen)				
Alekseevtsy				—
Alekseevtsy (artillerymen)				—
Samurovtsy				

== Gallery ==
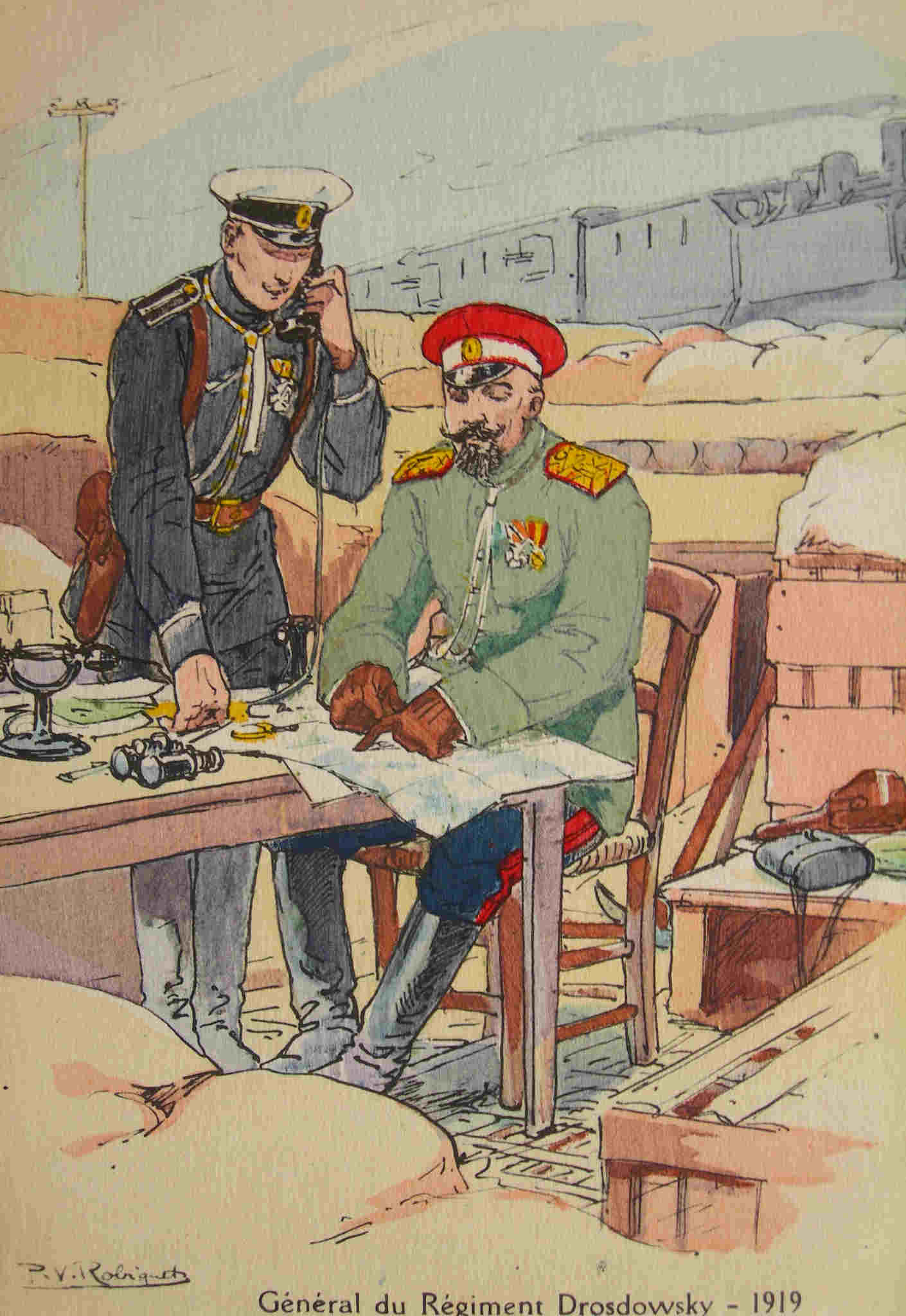
General Alexander Kutepov in the form of the Drozdov Riflemen and captain of the Markov Infantry Regiment. 1919. Watercolor by Pierre Robike

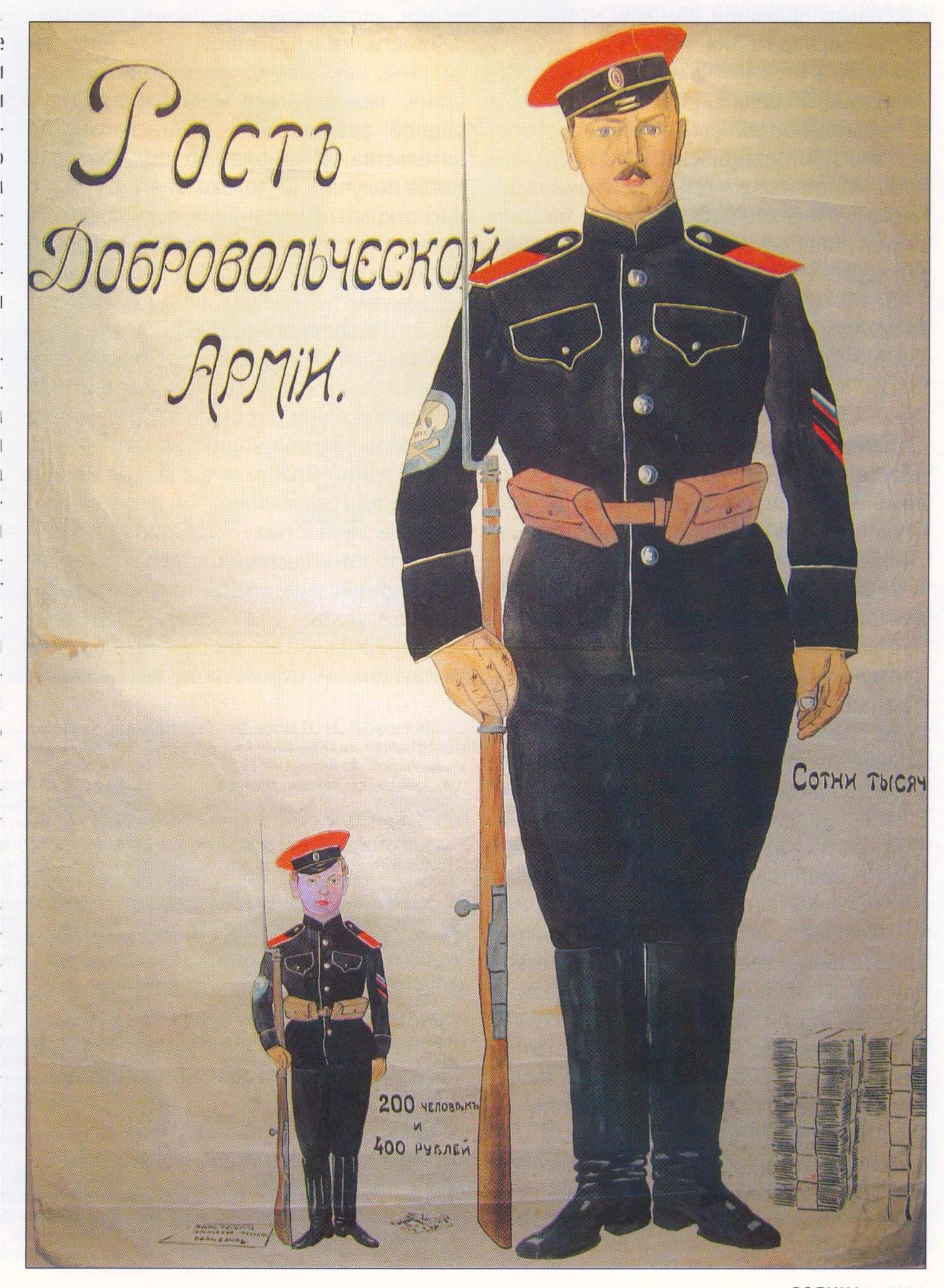
«The growth of the Volunteer Army» propaganda poster. 1919.

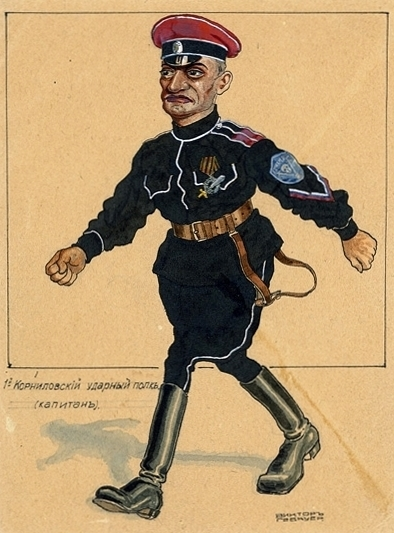
Captain of the 1st Kornilov Shock Regiment. Caricature by Victor Gebauer. 1920.

== See also ==
- Ranks and insignia of the White Movement
- Markovtsy
