= Vasily Pavlov (1895) =

Russian military officer

Vasily Efimovich Pavlov
- Василий Ефимович Павлов
- Born: March 9, 1895; Smolensk, Russian Empire
- Died: December 20, 1989 (aged 94); Chelles, Seine–et–Marne, Île–de–France
- Military career
- Allegiance: Russian Empire; White movement
- Branch: Infantry
- Service years: 1914–1922
- Rank: Lieutenant Colonel (1917)
- Commands: 7th Officer Company, 5th Company, 3rd Battalion and 1st Officer General Markov Regiment
- Conflicts: World War I Civil War
- Awards: Order of Saint George; Sign of the 1st Kuban (Ice) Campaign

Vasily Efimovich Pavlov (March 9, 1895 – December 20, 1989) was a Russian officer, a Markovite and lieutenant colonel. He participated in the First World War and the Russian Civil War. He was a pioneer of the White movement in the south of Russia.

He was one of the leaders of the Russian General Military Union. He was an emigrant. He was a Gallipolian. He was chairman of the "National Union of Russian Youth" in Grenoble, France. He was the head of the Association of Markovites, a prominent figure in the initial period of the existence of the People's Labour Union, chairman of the Russian Union of Saint George's Cavaliers, publisher and editor of the military–historical magazine "Communication on Markov's Chains", and author of works on the Russian Civil War.

== Early life ==
Born on February 25, 1885, in Smolensk, he graduated from the 1st Smolensk Aleksandrovskoe Real School and the Alekseevsk Military School.

At the front in the First World War since 1914, Pavlov fought in 1915–1917, on the Northwestern and Southwestern Fronts, and received several military awards, including the Order of Saint George, 4th Class (the Imperial Order of December 11, 1915), as a second lieutenant of the 24th Infantry General Neverovsky Regiment of Simbirsk. He was wounded three times.

== Volunteer Army ==
In the Volunteer Army since its creation. Pavlov took part in the First Kuban (February–April 1918) and Second Kuban campaigns (June–November 1918). On July 13, 1918, he was appointed assistant commander of the 7th Company of the 1st Officer General Markov Regiment, and commander on August 3.

On November 30, in a battle near the village of Konokovka, he was wounded and evacuated for recovery. In 1919 he commanded the 5th Company of the Officer General Markov Regiment.

After the formation of the 3rd Officer General Markov Regiment, he commanded the 3rd Battalion. From November 14 to December 4, 1919, he was the interim regiment commander.

== Emigration ==
From 1922 to 1925 he lived in Bulgaria, then moved to France. In 1925, Pavlov joined the Circle of Russian Youth in Bulgaria, then in 1926 headed the Circle of Russian Youth in Normandy. Later he was Chairman of the National Union of Russian Youth in Grenoble. From Germany he was sent as a resident of the People's Labour Union to Lepel in Belarus. During World War II, Pavlov supported the political current within the People's Labour Union, which opposed cooperation with both Hitler and Stalin.

In exile, Pavlov completed the work previously begun by regimental historians on the history of Markov Units. In 1962 and 1964, two volumes were published in Paris: "Markovites In the Battles And Campaigns For Russia In the Liberation War of 1917–1920". The materials of the work were republished in the book "Markov And Markovites".

== Last years ==
Vasily Efimovich died on December 20, 1989, in a nursing home in the city of Chelles (France), and was buried in the cemetery in Clichy.

Like many Russian heroes forced to leave their homeland, Pavlov died in poverty. All of his awards and documents, including the archive of the Markov Regiment, were bought by officers of the French Air Force and are probably kept in the museum of the Invalides in Paris.

== See also ==
- Markovites
- 1st Officer General Markov Regiment
