= 1st Officer General Markov Regiment =

1st Officer General Markov Regiment «Markovtsy»
- 1-й Офицерский генерала Маркова полк «Марковцы»
- Active: November 17, 1917 – 1922
- Country: Russia
- Allegiance: Volunteer Army
- Branch: Infantry
- Engagements: Russian Civil War

Lieutenant General Sergey Markov

The 1st Officer General Markov Regiment was the first of the military units of the Volunteer Army (later the Armed Forces of the South of Russia and the Russian Army), which received the patronage of one of the founders of the White Movement in southern Russia of the General Staff of Lieutenant General Sergey Markov.

== History ==
Date of foundation – November 17, 1917 – the day General Alekseev visited Novocherkassk Infirmary No. 2 on Barochnaya Street, after which an Officer Company was organized from the first volunteers.

With the beginning of the First Kuban campaign in the village of Olginskaya, the Volunteer Army was reorganized by converting small units into larger units. On February 25, 1918, the regiment was formed from the 1st, 2nd and 3rd Officer Battalions, the Shock Division of the Caucasian Cavalry Division, part of the 3rd Kiev School of Warrant Officers, the Rostov Officer and the Sea Company, as the Combined Officer Regiment, who later received a personal patronage of his first commander, General Markov. Initially, it consisted of 4 companies and a communications team and bombers with 13 machine guns. In mid-March 1918, the Special Junker Battalion (5th and 6th companies) was included in the regiment as the second battalion.

Already during the Ice Campaign, the Combined Officer Regiment began to be called the Officer Regiment; from mid-March 1918, it was part of the 1st Infantry Brigade under the command of General Markov. On June 9, 1918, it was renamed the 1st Officer Regiment.

On June 25, 1918, at the very beginning of the Second Kuban campaign, General Markov was killed in a battle near Shablievka station, who commanded the 1st Infantry Division of the Volunteer Army by that time. The departing red armored train fired the last shots, and a fragment of the head of the general who was watching the battle progress from the stack was demolished by a fragment of one of the shells. Now in this already city – Salsk – a monument has been erected to General Markov.

On black, Markov epaulets, henceforth was the monogram of General Markov: "Markov" and the monogram – "General Markov" for the 1st Company of the Regiment – "the Company of General Markov".

At the end of the Second Kuban campaign, almost without respite, the regiment was transferred to the Coal Basin, where, together with other parts of the Volunteer Army, it waged heavy battles against the Makhnovists and Red Army soldiers. It suffered losses in battles of up to 300 people, but was replenished with volunteers and reached the number of 1,500 people with 30 machine guns – the 4th Battalion was a combined battalion from the Siberian and Kabardin Regiments of 400 bayonets, which arrived from the Southern Army. Later, regiment participated in a Moscow campaign.

1st Officer General Markov Regiment at the parade in Yekaterinodar, 1918

By order of July 25, 1919, the formation of the 2nd Officer General Markov Regiment began. It was finally formed on August 27, 1919, in Kharkov on the basis of the 4th and Reserve Battalions and officer personnel of the 7th Company of the Markov Regiment.

On October 16, 1919, the 3rd Officer General Markov Regiment was formed. Its formation was carried out since September and took place in Kharkov on the basis of the 9th Officer Company of the 1st Regiment.

Flag of the Markovites

By order of the Commander-in-Chief of the Armed Forces of the South of Russia of October 27, 1919, the 1st Infantry Division, which included all three Markov regiments, was divided into Kornilov Shock and Officer General Markov Infantry Divisions. In addition to the Markov regiments, the Artillery General Markov Brigade formed on October 28, 1919, on the basis of the 1st Artillery Brigade, as well as the 1st Separate Engineering General Markov Company, became part of the formed division. In the spring and autumn of 1919, reserve battalions of the Markov division were created – one for the entire division and one for each regiment, whose personnel were used to replenish combat units. The battalions were disbanded in early 1920. In this composition, the division was part of the 1st Army Corps.

On December 31, 1919, during the retreat of the Armed Forces of the South of Russia, the Markov Division in the Donbas (Russian: Донбасс) was encircled in the village of Alekseevo-Leonovo and lost two-thirds of the personnel. After the restoration of its strength, in January 1920, it successfully held the defense south of Rostov-on-Don. But during the retreat of Denikin's army deep into the Kuban, he was defeated again on February 29 in the battle near the village of Olginskaya, after which on March 1 the division was reorganized into the Officer General Markov regiment. Colonel Alexander Bleish was appointed commander. The artillery brigade was reduced to the Separate Artillery General Markov Division, the horse-drawn hundreds – to the Horse Division.

Markovites were assigned to Novorossiysk. Poured replenishment allowed the deployment of the Markov division again as part of 3 regiments and an artillery brigade. The total composition of the division reached almost 3800 people – of which 906 officers. At the same time, the 1st Officer General Markov Regiment consisted of 284 officers with 549 soldiers – this regiment was the largest in the division.

After the evacuation of Markov units from Novorossiysk to Crimea, on March 26, 1920, the division was restored. In Crimea, it became part of the formed 1st Army Corps. The division was replenished to almost 4,5 thousand people, and the 1st Regiment consisted of 1043 people (375 of which were officers) with 27 machine guns.

On May 11, 1920, after the renaming of the Armed Forces of the South of Russia by General Peter Wrangel to the Russian Army, the Officer General Markov Division was renamed the General Markov Infantry Division (in accordance with this renaming, the regiments of the division were also called "infantry"). In the summer of 1920, reserve battalions of regiments and divisions were re-created as part of the division (the latter was intended for deployment in the 4th Regiment, the formation of which was begun in October). As part of the 1st Army Corps, the Markov Division participated in battles in Northern Tavria and the Zadniprovsky operation. In the last battle, the Markovites, not receiving the support of the Drozdovites, wavered and began to retreat. Colonel Tretyakov shot himself. Markovites with difficulty were able to break into the Crimea.

The brigade from the 1st and 3rd Markov Infantry Regiments, led by Colonel Pyotr Sagaidachny, participated in the last battles of the Russian Army of General Wrangel in Crimea in November 1920.

The regiment guarded the Chongar Isthmus. The order to retreat was not delivered to them on time. All White Guard units then left, even the armored train. The colonel realized that it was necessary to make a quick decision, and, subjugating the 3rd regiment, hurriedly led the brigade south. Soon the Cossack rode up with a report that we should retreat – with a delay of 3 hours. But the Markovites almost caught up with their leaving column. In parallel to them was the numerous Red Cavalry. Ahead from the Kurman-Kemelchi station, firing off, white armored trains left and the Markovites turned out to be surrounded. Closing in the square they volleys and machine guns did not allow the red cavalry to cut into their ranks. The early twilight came and allowed them to retreat.

In early November 1920, the division, along with other parts of the Russian army, was evacuated from Crimea. On November 27 in Gallipoli, the remainder of the division was reduced to the Markov Regiment and the Markov Artillery Division. For the ranks of the regiment in exile, a breastplate was installed in the form of a black Maltese cross with a white narrow border, in the center – a black rectangle with diagonally intersecting lines, surrounded by a silver crown of thorns; at the ends of the cross dates: "12", "Feb", "19", "18".

In 1922, after moving to Bulgaria, the Markovites ceased to exist as separate military units, entering the Russian All-Military Union in 1924.

== Regiment commanders (before forming a division) ==
- Lieutenant General Sergey Markov (February 12 – mid-March 1918);
- Major General Alexander Borovsky (mid-March – April 20, 1918);
- Colonel Nikolai Doroshevich (April 20 – 21, 1918);
- Colonel Ivan Khovansky (April 21 – 27, 1918);
- Colonel Nikolai Timanovsky (April 27 – October 16, 1918);
- Major General Nikolai Khodakovsky (October 22 – November 8, 1918) (wounded in October 1918);
- Colonel Narkevich (interim, October – November 19, 1918);
- Colonel of the General Staff Konstantin Geideman (November 27 – December 2, 1918) (on December 3, 1918, killed in battle);
- Colonel Alexei Bulatkin (interim, November 19 – December 13, 1918);
- Colonel of the General Staff Dmitry Salnikov (November 27, 1918 – March 1919) (removed from office due to a conflict with personnel);
- Colonel Alexander Bleish (March 1919 – November 1919).

== Regiment commanders (after forming a division) ==
- Colonel Ivan Dokukin (interim) (November 1919);
- Colonel Dmitry Slonovsky (November – December 1919);
- Captain (Colonel) Dionisy Marchenko (January 4, 1920 – October 12, 1920);
- Colonel Dmitry Slonovsky (October 12 – mid-October 1920);
- Lieutenant Colonel G. A. Lebedev (mid-October – November 3, 1920) (killed);
- Captain V. V. Kolomatsky (interim) (November 1920);
- Colonel Dionisy Marchenko (from October 21, 1920 – until the evacuation from the Crimea).

== Regiment commanders (in exile) ==
- Colonel Ivan Dokukin (Acting) (December 1920);
- Major General Mikhail Peshnya (November 1920 – 1936);
- Colonel Dionisy Marchenko (since 1936);
- Major General Gavriil Zhdanov (1936 – after 1943).

== Heads of the division ==
- November 10, 1919 – December 18, 1919 – Major General Nikolai Timanovsky (died of typhus) (Chief of Staff Colonel Arthur Bittenbinder);
- December 18, 1919 – December 22, 1919 – Colonel Arthur Bittenbinder (interim);
- December 22, 1919 – January 6, 1920 – Colonel Alexander Blaish (interim);
- January 6, 1920 – February 29, 1920 – Lieutenant General Pavel Kantserov;
- February 29, 1920 – March 18, 1920 – Colonel Alexander Bleish (died of typhus on March 24, 1920);
- March 1920 – Colonel Peter Mashin (interim) (for several days in March 1920 he replaced Colonel Bleisch);
- April 8, 1920 – October 27, 1920 – Major General Nikolai Tretyakov (shot himself);
- October 27, 1920 – November 3, 1920 – Major General Vladimir Manstein (interim);
- From November 1920 – Major General Mikhail Peshnia (in Gallipoli).

== See also ==
- Sergey Markov
- Vasily Pavlov

== Sources ==
- Vasily Pavlov. Markovites in Battles and Campaigns for Russia in the Lberation War of 1917–1920 (in 2 Books). Paris: 1962–1964
- Markov and Markovites. Moscow: Non-Profit Partnership Sowing, 2001 (archived from wayback machine)
