= Markovtsy =

Flag of Markov units

Markovtsy was the name of the military units of the Volunteer Army (later the Armed Forces of the South of Russia and the Russian Army), who received the patronage of one of the founders of the White Movement in southern Russia of the General Staff of Lieutenant General Sergei Markov.

The date of formation of the first Markov unit – the 1st Officer General Markov Regiment – November 17, 1917 – the day General Alekseyev visited Novocherkassk Infirmary No. 2 on Barochnaya Street, after which the Joint–Officer Company was organized from the first volunteers.

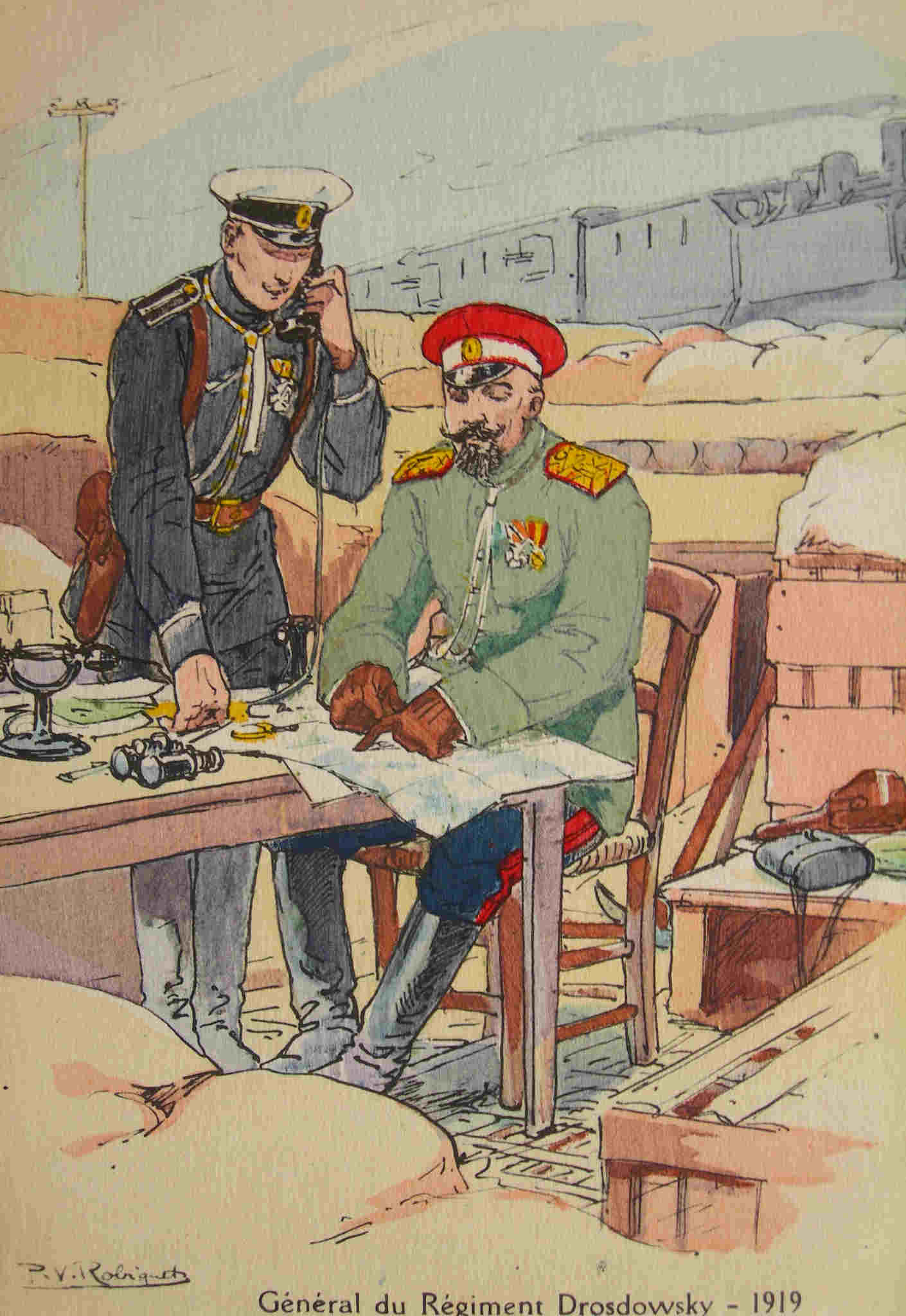
General Alexander Kutepov in the form of the Drozdov Riflemen and captain of the Markov Infantry Regiment. 1919. Watercolor by Pierre Robike

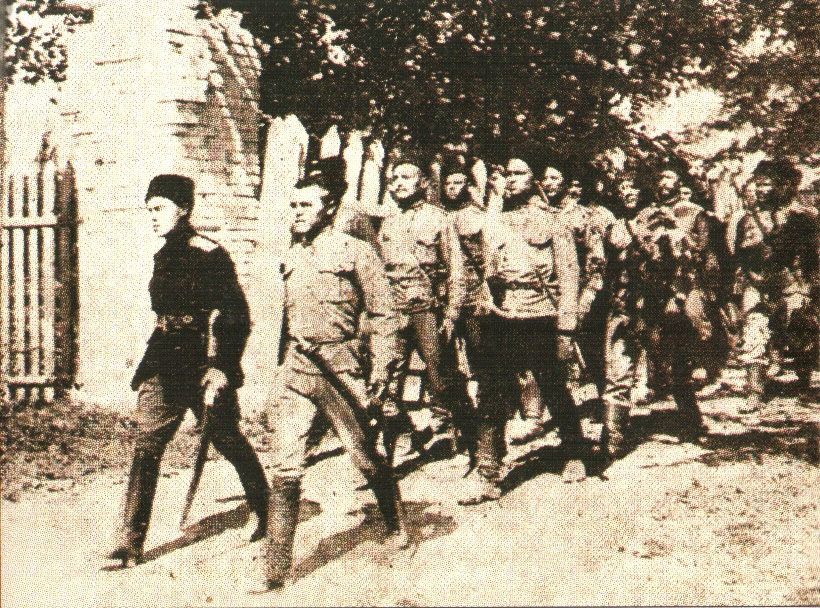
Markovites enter the taken city. 1919

In November 1917, the artillery unit was also created, which subsequently received the patronage of General Markov. It, created from the cadets of the Mikhailovsky and Konstantinovsky artillery schools, subsequently served as the basis for the Artillery General Markov brigade.

With the beginning of the First Kuban Campaign in the village of Olginskaya, the Volunteer Army was reorganized by converting small detachments into larger units. Among the newly formed was the Combined Officer Regiment, which later received the nominal patronage of its first commander, General Markov.

During the campaign, the future artillery of the Markovites was also reorganized: the 1st Separate Light Artillery Division was disbanded, and the 1st Officer Battery, which was part of it, after the 4th Battery of the division was included in it, was called the 1st Separate Battery as part of the 1st Infantry Brigade.

Every regiment has its own physiognomy. Inexhaustible enthusiasm and youth of Drozdovites. Unshakably calm courage, an inevitable impulse of the Kornilovites. But there is another regiment. Strange and unique its appearance. Strict, simple black uniform without any decoration, only gleams and tops of caps are white. A muffled soft voice... Restraint is the hallmark of these people whom the "mannered Markovites" have long outlined for the provincial young ladies.

— "Russia". Kursk. 1919. No. 8 of October 10

In mid-March 1918, on the basis of the Technical Company formed in December 1917, the 1st Engineering Company, which entered the 1st Brigade, was organized. She received the patronage of General Markov on December 21, 1919.

After the death of General Markov at the very beginning of the Second Kuban Campaign, by order of the commander of the Volunteer Army, the 1st Officer Regiment was renamed the 1st Officer General Markov Regiment.

During the Second Kuban Campaign, the Markov artillery was reorganized again: on July 21, 1918, the 1st Separate Battery was deployed into the 1st Separate Light Artillery Division as part of the 1st Infantry Division.

On August 20, the 1st Battery receives the patronage of General Markov and the name of the 1st Officers General of Markov Battery.

In May 1918, another unit was formed, which later received the name "Markov". In accordance with the request of General Markov, a hundred Kuban Cossacks were allocated from the Horse Brigade, called the Separate Horse Hundred at the 1st Infantry Brigade. Cossacks sewed black "Markov" epaulettes, and a hundred began to be unofficially called "Markov".

After the capture of Orel, the Markov regiments were separated from the 1st Division and entered the created Markov Division.

In December 1919, the Markov division almost completely died during the retreat from Kharkov in front of the superior Red forces in a battle near the village of Alekseevo-Leonovo of the Don Host Oblast.

Already in the Crimea in the Russian Army of General Baron Pyotr Wrangel, in the Markov Division, by order of the Commander-in-Chief No. 3517 of September 3, 1920, the Equestrian General Markov Division was formed from the Separate Horse Hundred.

== Military uniform of Markovites ==
The black shoulder straps of the Markov units completely repeated the shoulder straps of the shock units of the Russian Imperial Army of 1917. The black form of the Markovites symbolized Death and the readiness to die for Russia, and the white cap of the cap meant Cleanliness and Resurrection of the Homeland.

== See also ==
- Colored military units

== Sources ==
- "Markov and Markovites". Moscow: Non-Profit Partnership Sowing, 2001. ISBN 5-85824-146-8
- "Vasily Pavlov. Markovites in the Donbass". Armed Forces in the South of Russia. January–June 1919. Forgotten and Unknown Russia. The White Movement in Russia, Volume 17. Moscow: Centerpolygraph. 2003. pp. 105–119. ISBN 5-95-24-0666-1.
- "Alexander Leontiev. Markov Artillerymen in the Battles in the Donbass". Armed Forces in the South of Russia. January–June 1919. Forgotten and Unknown Russia. The White Movement in Russia, Volume 17. Moscow: Centerpolygraph. 2003. pp. 119–145. ISBN 5-95-24-0666-1.
