= Ivan Sorokin =

Russian revolutionary (1884–1918)

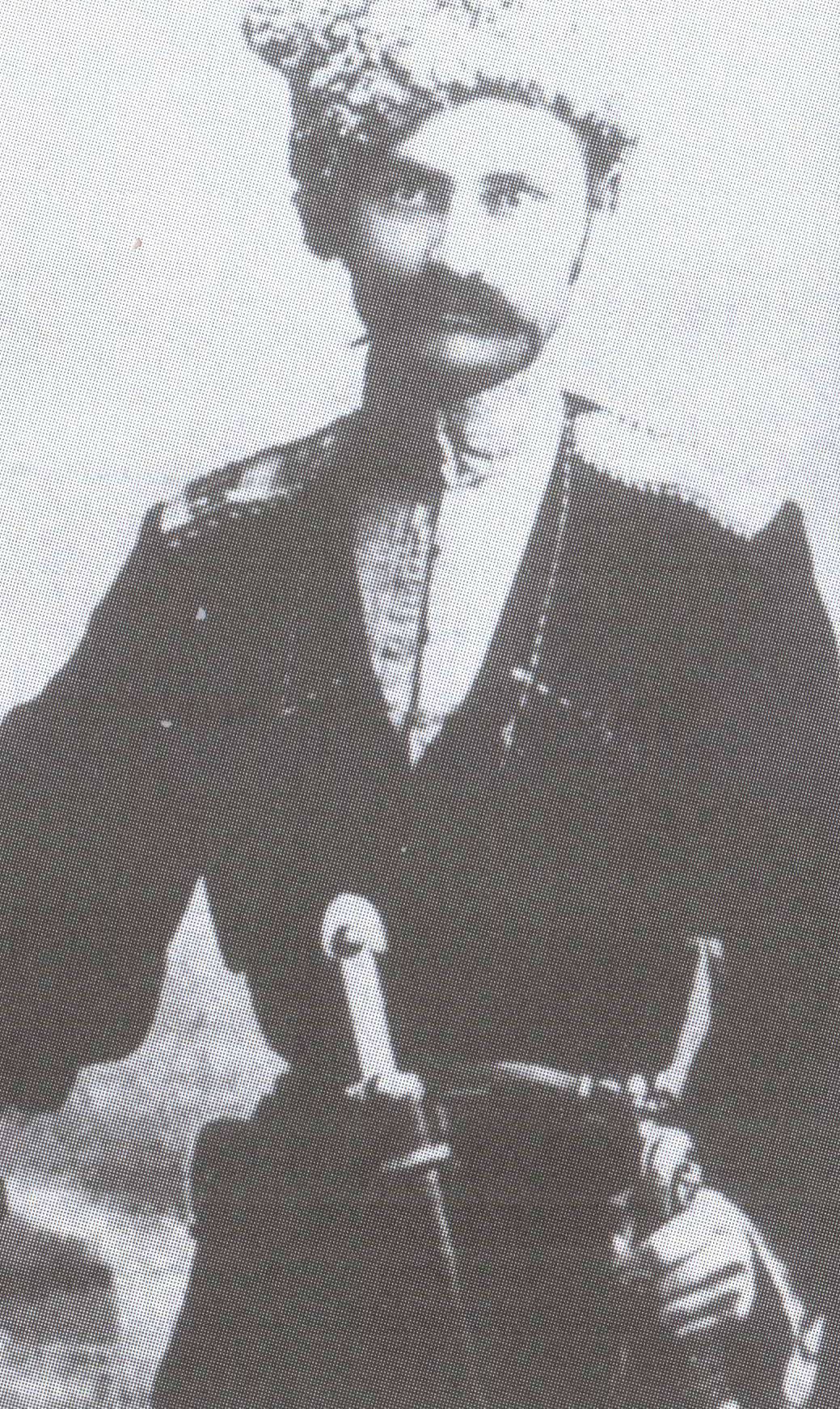
Sorokin in traditional Kuban Cossack costume

Ivan Lukich Sorokin (Russian: Иван Лукич Сорокин; 4 December 1884 – 3 November 1918) was a Russian military leader and participant in the Russo-Japanese War, World War I, and the Russian Civil War. He was Commander-in-Chief of the Red Army of the North Caucasus and Commander of the 11th Red Army.

Working his way up through the ranks, he was eventually commissioned as an officer. Sorokin arranged the execution of his rival commander, Ivan Matveyev, on 7 October 1918. Following the execution, Sorokin established a reign of terror that demoralized the Red armies in the North Caucasus, which caused him to be declared a traitor on 27 October. He was subsequently assassinated on 2 November 1918.

== Biography ==
=== Early life and education ===
A cossack from the Kuban region, Sorokin graduated from the Yekaterinodar military paramedic school and became a member of the Socialist Revolutionary Party in April 1917.

=== First World War ===
During the First World War he served in the 1st Labinsk Regiment of the Caucasian Front as a paramedic. In 1915, he was sent to the Tiflis Ensign School, after which in 1916 he was promoted to the rank of "cornet" (xору́нжий) .

From 1916 and 1917, Sorokin served in the 3rd Linear Regiment. In 1917 he was promoted and was awarded the St. George Cross of the 3rd and 4th degree.

=== Civil War ===
In early 1918 he organized the first Red Cossack detachment in the Kuban.

Since February 1918, he served as assistant commander of the Southeast Red Army.

During the Kuban Offensive by the Volunteer Army, Sorokin led Bolshevik forces in the Northern Caucasus, replacing K. I. Kalnin and Alexei Ivanovich Avtonomov.

In April and May 1918, he supported the Commander-in-Chief of the North Caucasian Red Army A.I. Avtonomov in his conflict with the civilian authorities of the Kuban-Black Sea Republic. Soon after the removal of Avtonomov because of this conflict and the appointment of K.I. Kalnin in his place, July 21 (August 4) 1918 replaced the latter, after the defeat of the Reds by the Volunteer Army near Tikhoretskaya and Kushchevskaya (Second Kuban campaign), as commander of the Red Army North Caucasus. By order of the headquarters of the North Caucasus Military District on September 24, 1918, Sorokin was approved as commander in chief of the North Caucasus troops. Sorokin's army was 30 to 40 thousand soldiers of the former Caucasian front with 80–90 guns and 2 armored trains, located in the Kushchevka-Sosyka area and had two fronts: North against the Germans; Northeast against the Don and Volunteer armies.

On 3 October 1918, the Northern Caucasus army became the Eleventh Red Army, with Sorokin as Commander-in-Chief.

Matveev and Sorokin agreed on the need to link up with the Tenth Army at Tsaritsyn, but they disagreed on how to do so. Sorokin wanted to move against Stavropol, then Vladikavkaz, then onwards to Tsaritsyn. Matveev refused to follow this plan, so on 7 October, Sorokin ordered his execution. On 21 October, Sorokin then executed the four members of the Republic of the Northern Caucasus Military Revolutionary Soviet. According to Peter Kenez, "Then started a reign of terror in Piatigorsk which was remarkable even by Civil War standards. Bolsheviks and anti-Bolsheviks suffered alike; innocent hostages, including Generals Radko-Dmitriev and Ruzskii, were executed and even the Bolshevik city organization had to go underground." On 27 October, Sorokin was declared a traitor by the Bolshevik faction of the Central Executive Committee of the Soviet in Nevinnomyssk. On 2 November, Sorokin was killed in Stavropol.
