= Ranks and insignia of the White Movement =

Military ranks and insignia of the White Movement (1918-1922) were based on the former Ranks and insignia of the Imperial Russian Armed Forces. However, there were new features and modifications compared to the old system:

- The corps colors of the former imperial army were no longer observed, as officers from the former regiments were assigned new units. Double piping of shoulder boards (outer piping - one color, inside piping - another color), which was common in many pre-revolutionary military units, only survived in the Cossack troops and in the Ministry of Interior of Kolchak's government.
- The People's Army of Komuch initially abolished shoulder board insignia (shoulder boards only contained numbers of military units and looked alike for all ranks), following traditions of the February Revolution, and replaced them with sleeve insignia. However, with the influx of many former officers who generally disliked the revolution, the army first restored shoulder boards in addition to the sleeve insignia. Later, when Alexander Kolchak established his dictatorship, sleeve insignia of the People’s Army were no longer worn.
- The Siberian Army's insignia were resemblant to those of the Army of Komuch, and were abolished for the same reason.
- The so-called officer regiments (Alexeev, Drozdovsky, Kornilov and Markov regiments) had their own colors and uniforms. Initially, only former officers were accepted to these regiments, for which reason their ranks began with the 2nd lieutenant (podporuchik) upwards. In addition, the officer regiments introduced sleeve insignia (from 1 to 8 horizontal bars). Later, these regiments introduced ranks for soldiers and non-commissioned officers as well. Their corps colors were:
  - Alexeyev regiment: blue background of shoulder boards, white piping, white stripes for officers and white contour of the zigzag for generals; artillery had black background, red piping and stripes;
  - Drozdovsky regiment: dark red (magenta) background of shoulder boards, white piping, black stripes for officers and black zigzag for generals;
  - Kornilov regiment: background of shoulder boards: black bottom, red top, white piping, white stripes for officers and white zigzag for generals; in case of embroidered shoulder boards for parade uniform: white embroidery, piping and officer stripes split in two (black top, red bottom), while the zigzag of generals was of the same color as the embroidery.
  - Markov regiment: black background of shoulder boards, white piping, white stripes for officers and white contour of the zigzag for generals;
- Golden or silver color embroidery of shoulder boards became quite rare, and was generally worn only on special occasions. Most officers wore shoulder boards of field colors (khaki with brown stripes); those from the officer regiments and local formations could wear shoulder boards in colors of respective formations.
- By 1919, the former ranks of praporshchik (ensign) and podpolkovnik (lieutenant-colonel) were abolished in all White formations as redundant; however, newly enrolled former officers with respective ranks could wear their former insignia during the probation period until new ranks were conferred to them. The podpolkovnik rank was briefly restored by Wrangel in mid-1920.
- Cossack troops were an important exception; they conserved all their ranks and corps colors without significant changes. Steppe Cossacks under the command of Ataman Semyonov and Ataman Kalmykov wore a sleeve shield insignia. Cossacks within the armies of Semyonov, would wear a yellow red-piped sleeve shield, with a red “OMO” inscribed on it (OMO for Special Manchurian Detachment). Cossacks within Ataman Kalmykov’s Detachment, would wear a yellow black-piped sleeve shield, with a black “K” inscribed on it (K for Kalmykov).
- Militants of Boris Annenkov’s movement had a very elaborate system of their uniforms and corps colors, although their ranks followed the Cossack traditions. Annenkov was the only one who had a general rank; the zigzag embroidery of his shoulder boards had a bit different format than those used in other White units: it was a zizgaz pattern consisting of three parallel thin lines.

After the defeat in the Civil War, White troops were evacuated abroad, beginning with Wrangel's troops that escaped from Crimea to Turkey in 1920, and until Zemskaya Rat escaped from the Far East to China and Korea in 1922. Military formations of the White Movement continued to exist in emigration. In China, White formations took part in local conflicts wearing the same uniforms and rank insignia. In Europe, former White generals maintained a system of military training for their supporters under the auspices of Russian All-Military Union and continued awarding military ranks and orders. However, in the wake of the approaching World War, these formations (and eventually wearing of the former Russian military uniforms) were eventually prohibited by local governments. The longest surviving example of such insignia was the Russian military school in Tianjing (1940).

During the WW2, attempts to restore the system of ranks of the Whites in pro-German collaborator formations were not successful; a known exception is the Russian Corps in Yugoslavia, which had ranks and insignia of the White movement in 1941-1942. Vlasov's army introduced its own ranks and insignia in 1942, which, in spite of the visible resemblance with the old system, were based on German standards and thus had different number of stars for respective ranks, and sometimes different rank names.

== Rank Insignia ==
=== Officers ===
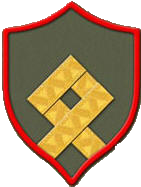
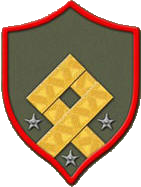
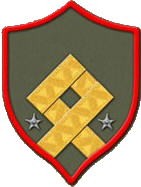
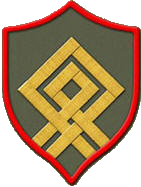
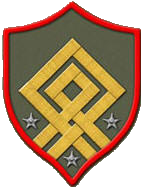
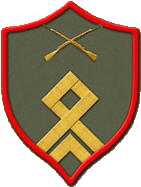
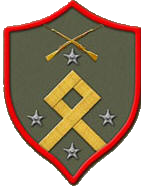
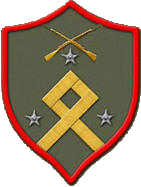
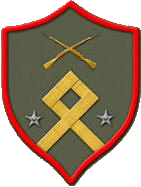
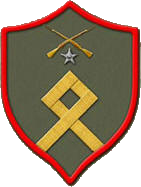
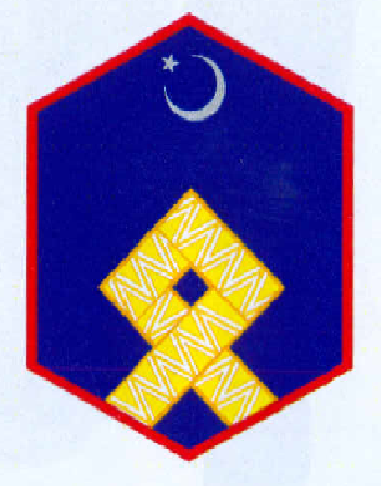
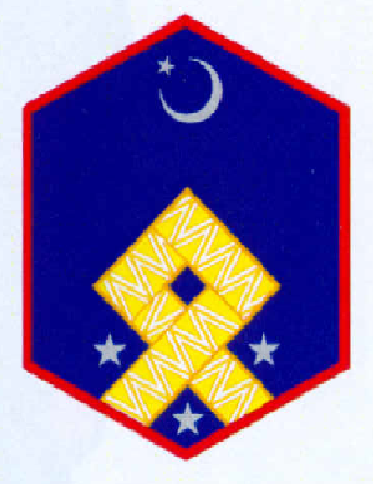
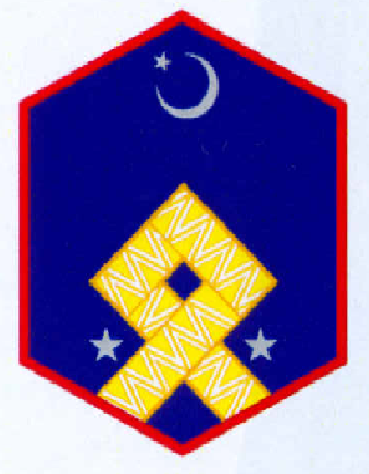
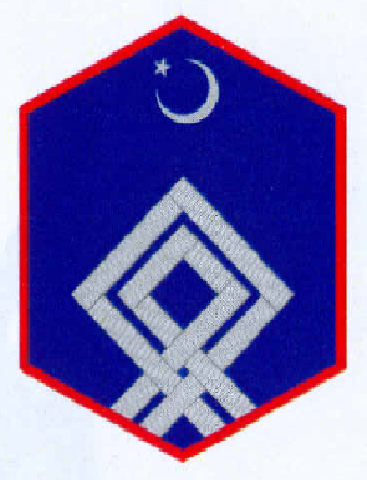
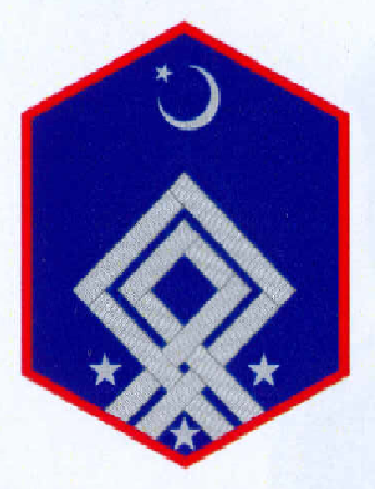
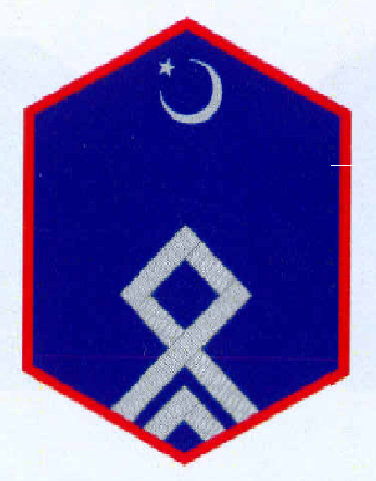
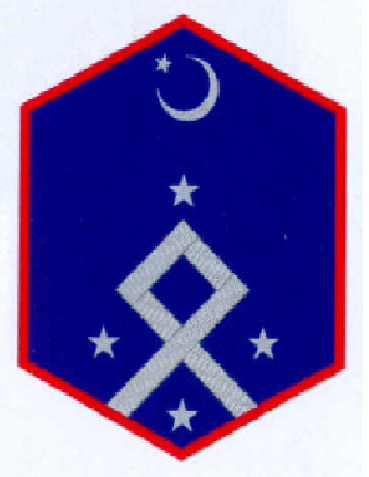
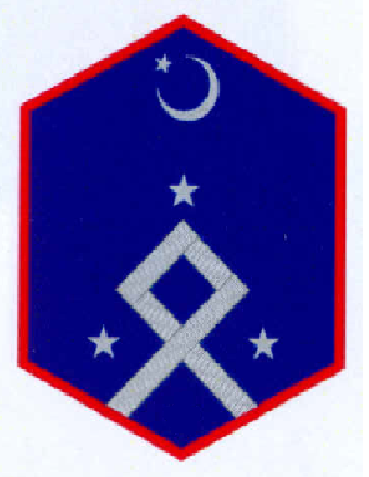
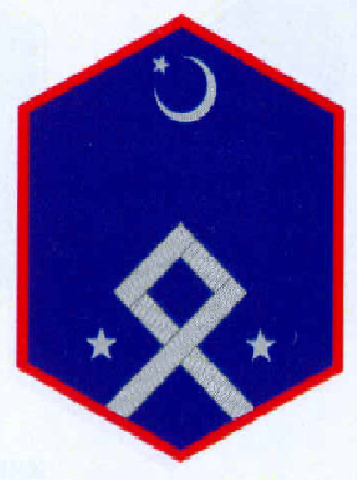
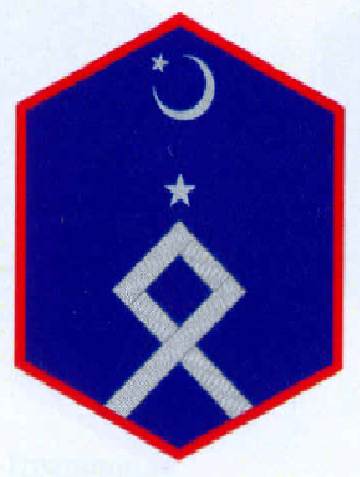
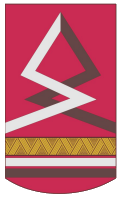
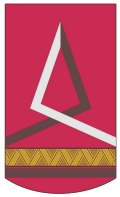
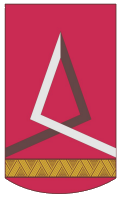
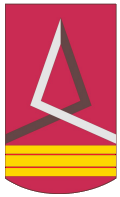
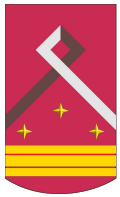
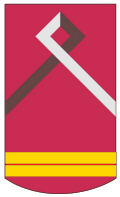
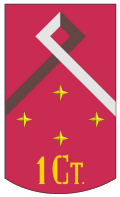
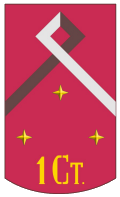
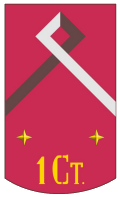
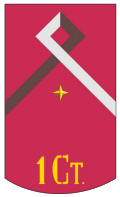
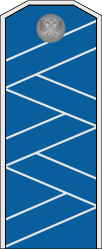
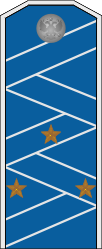
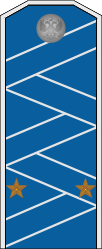
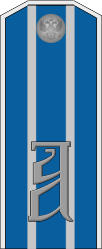
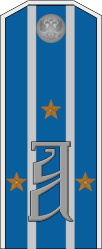
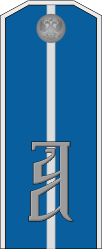
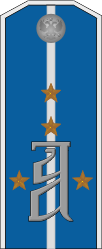
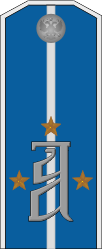
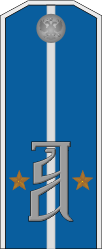
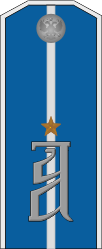
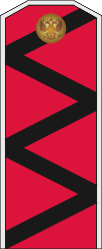
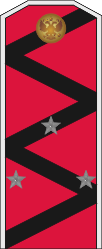
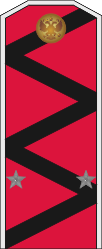
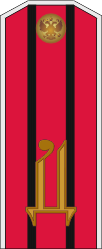
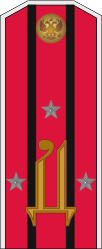
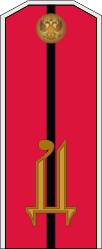
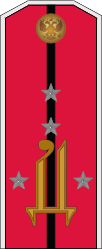
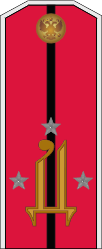
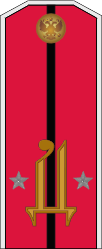
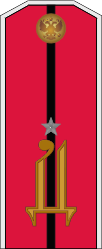
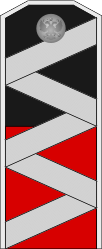
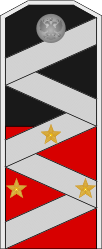
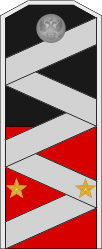
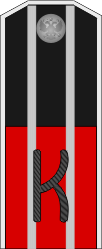
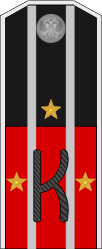
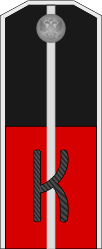
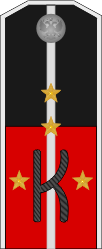
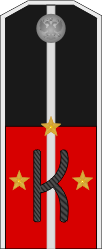
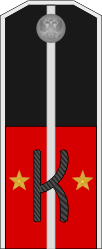
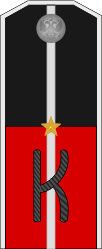
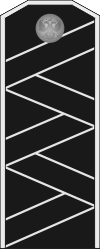
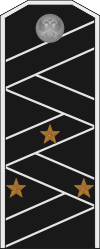
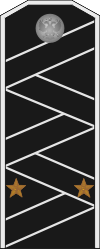
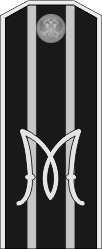
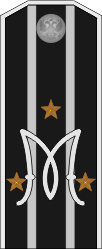
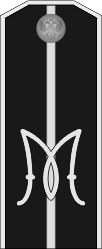
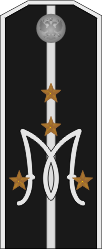
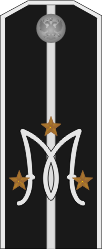
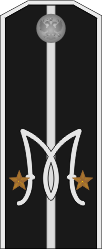
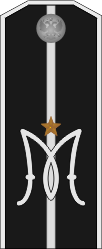
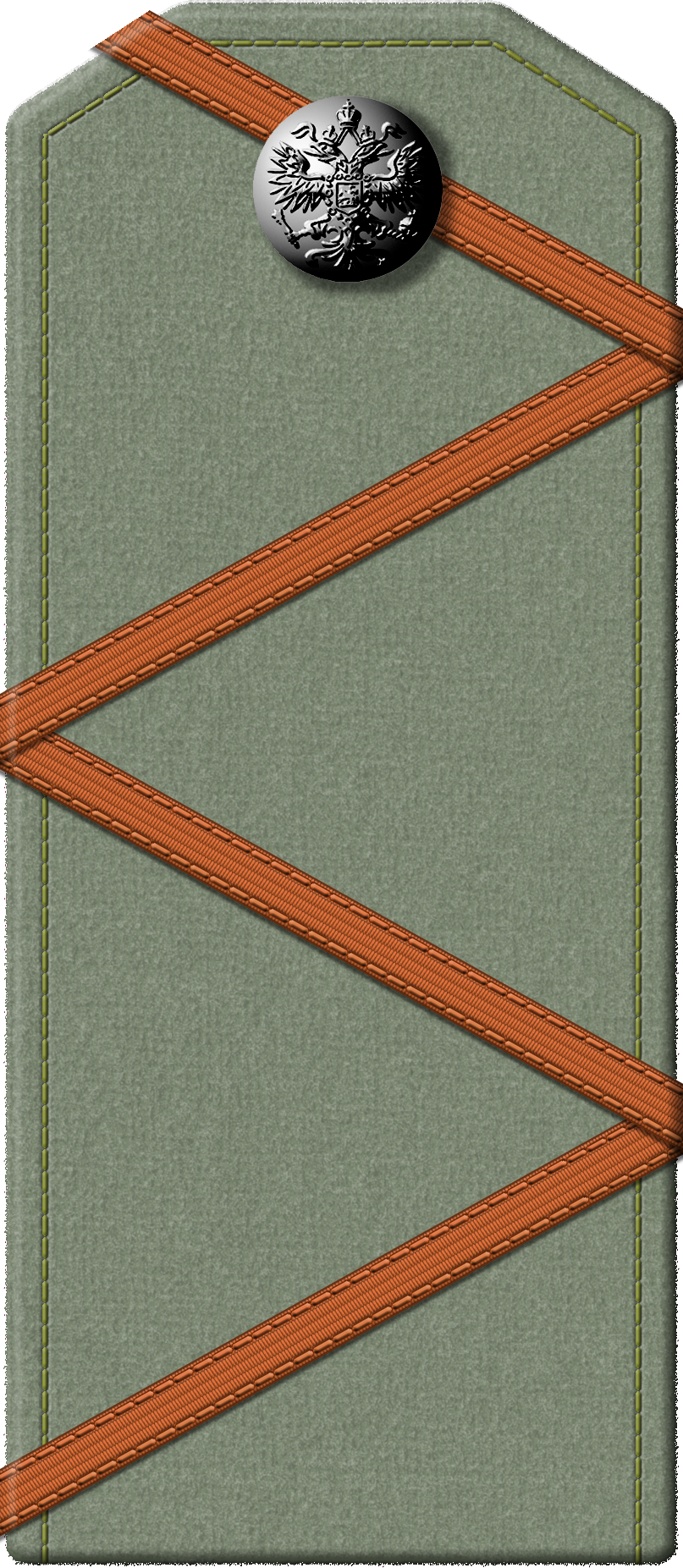
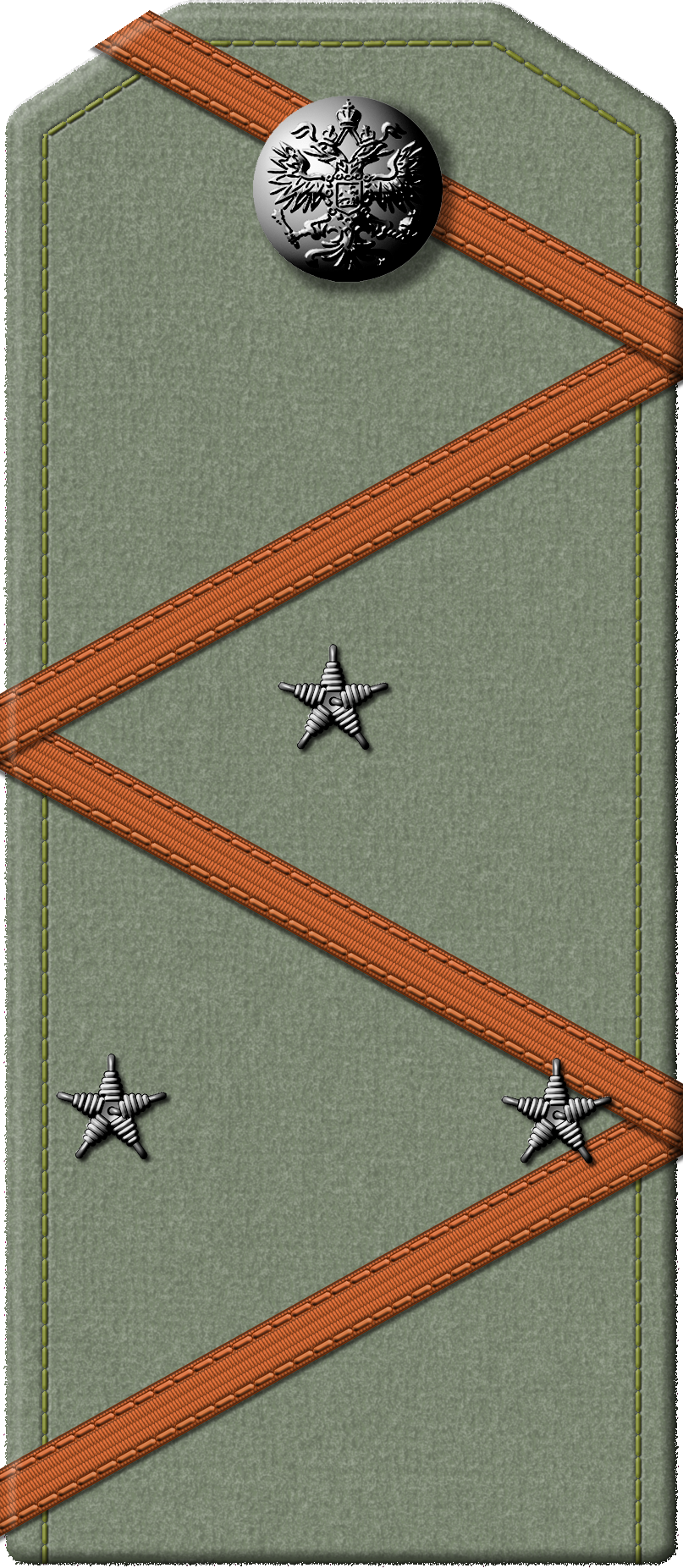
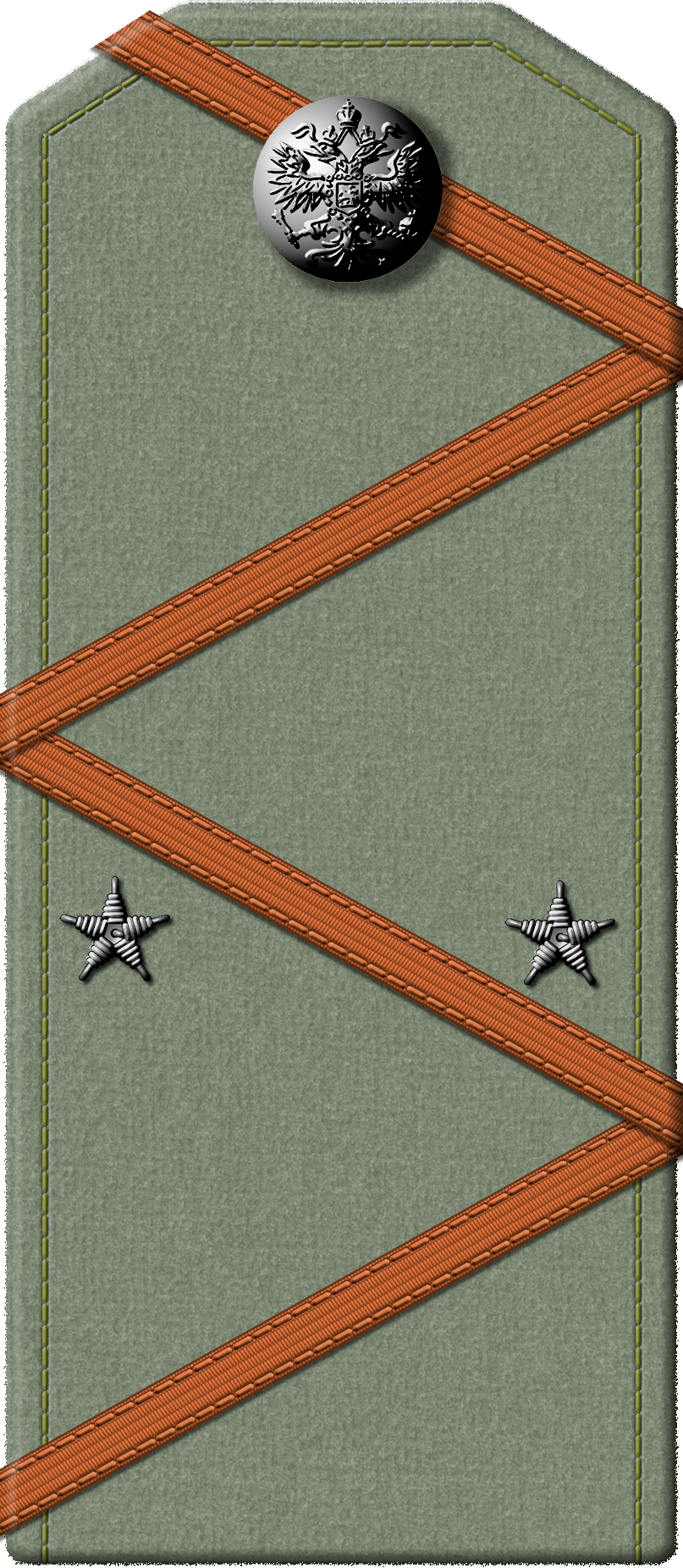
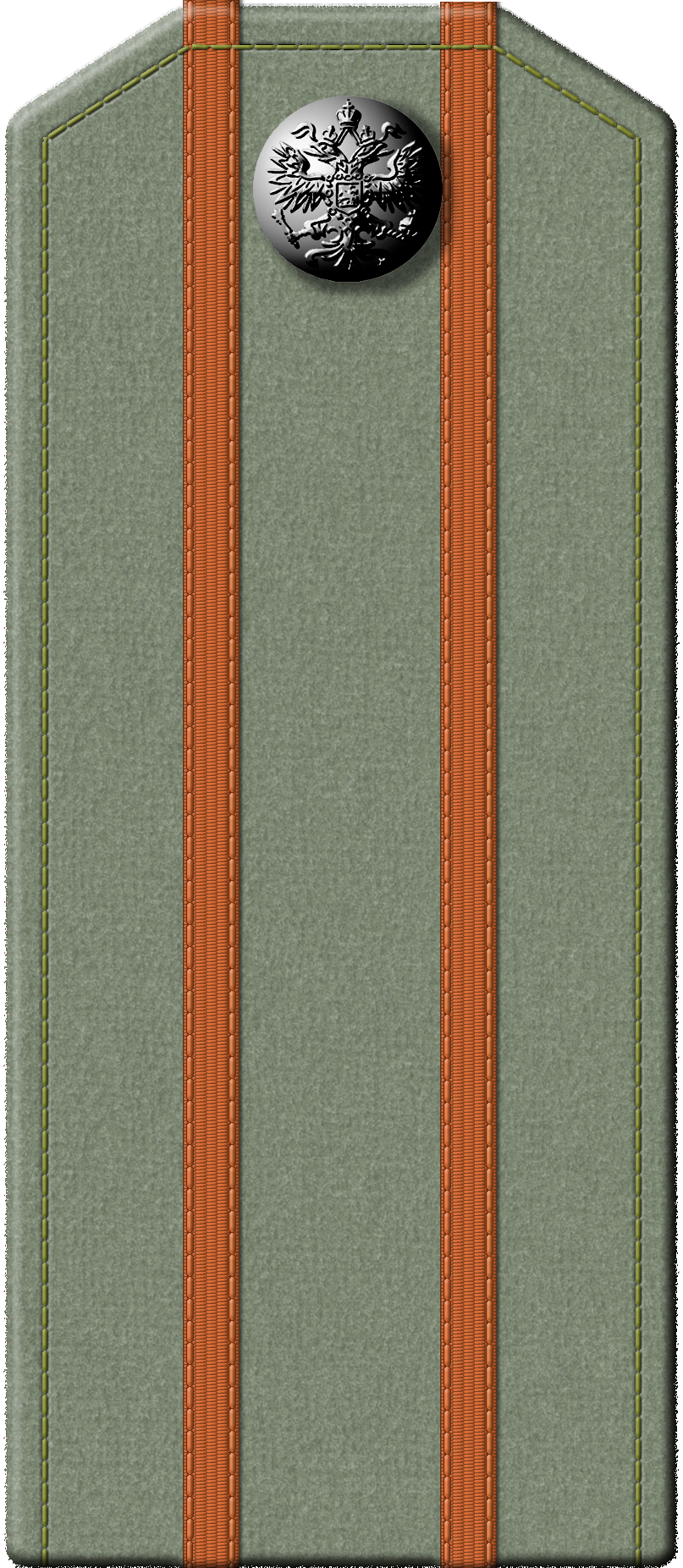
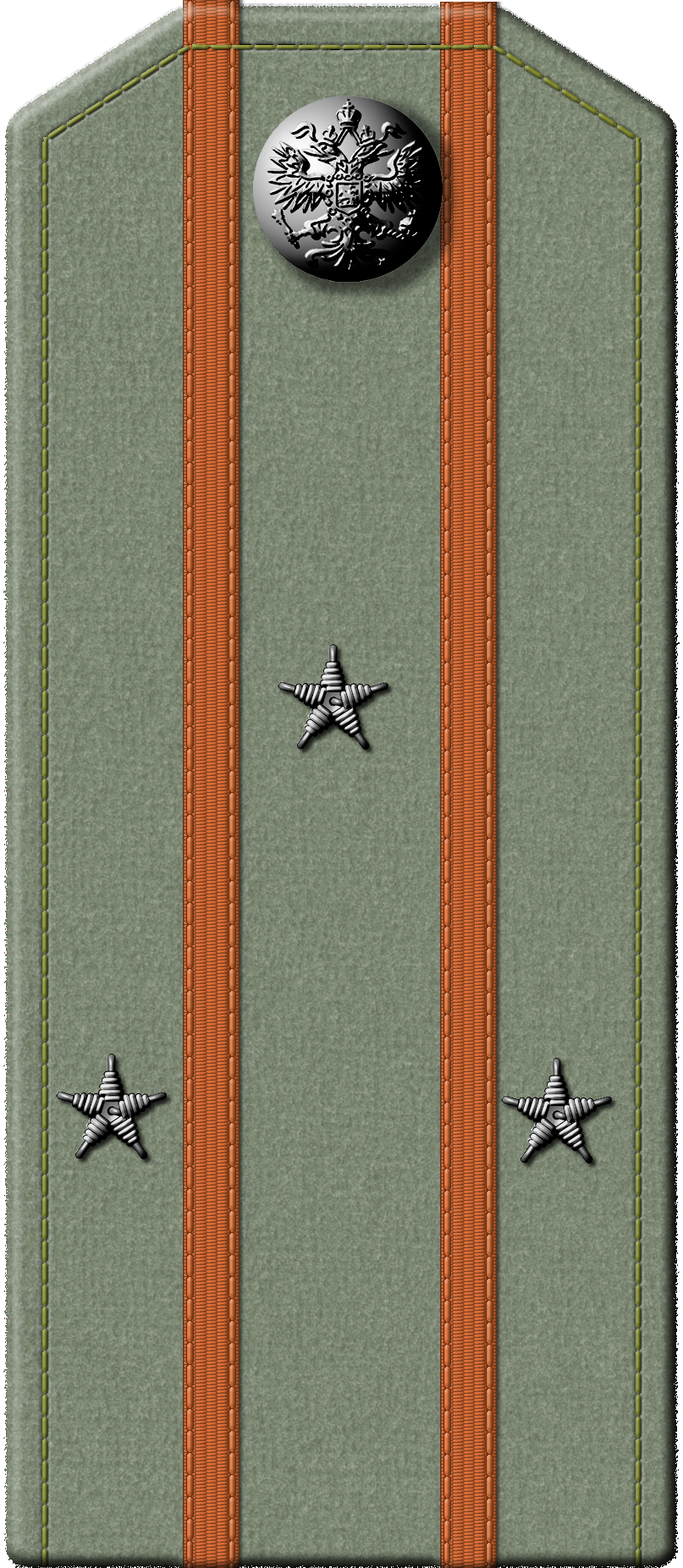
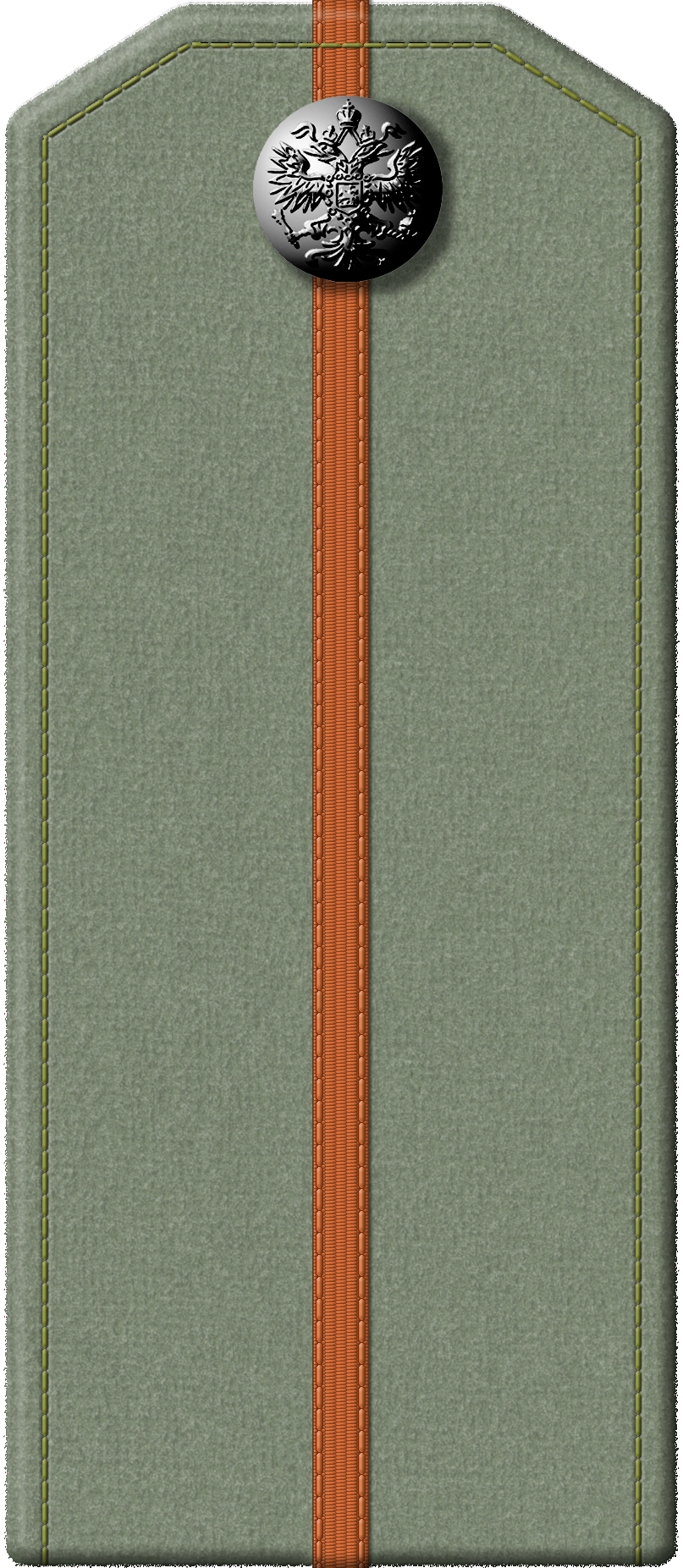
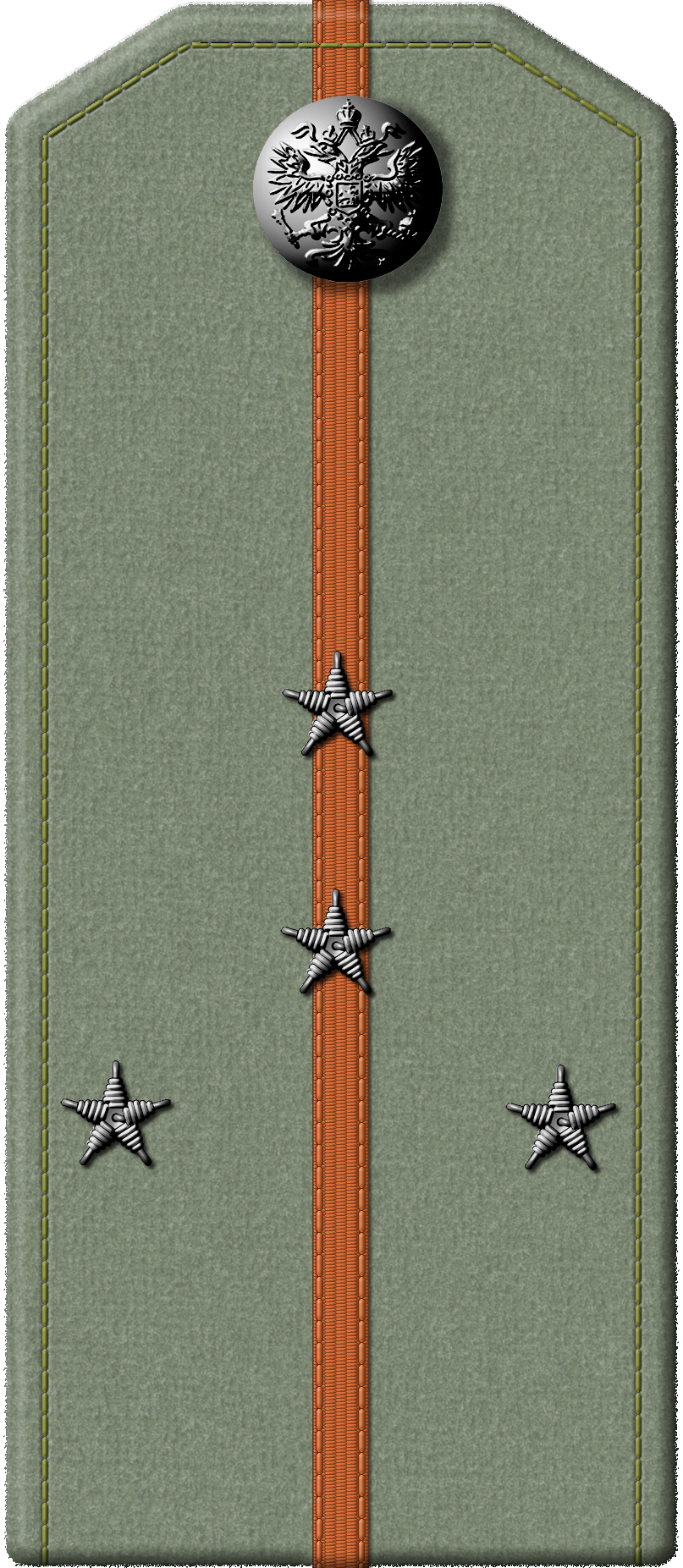
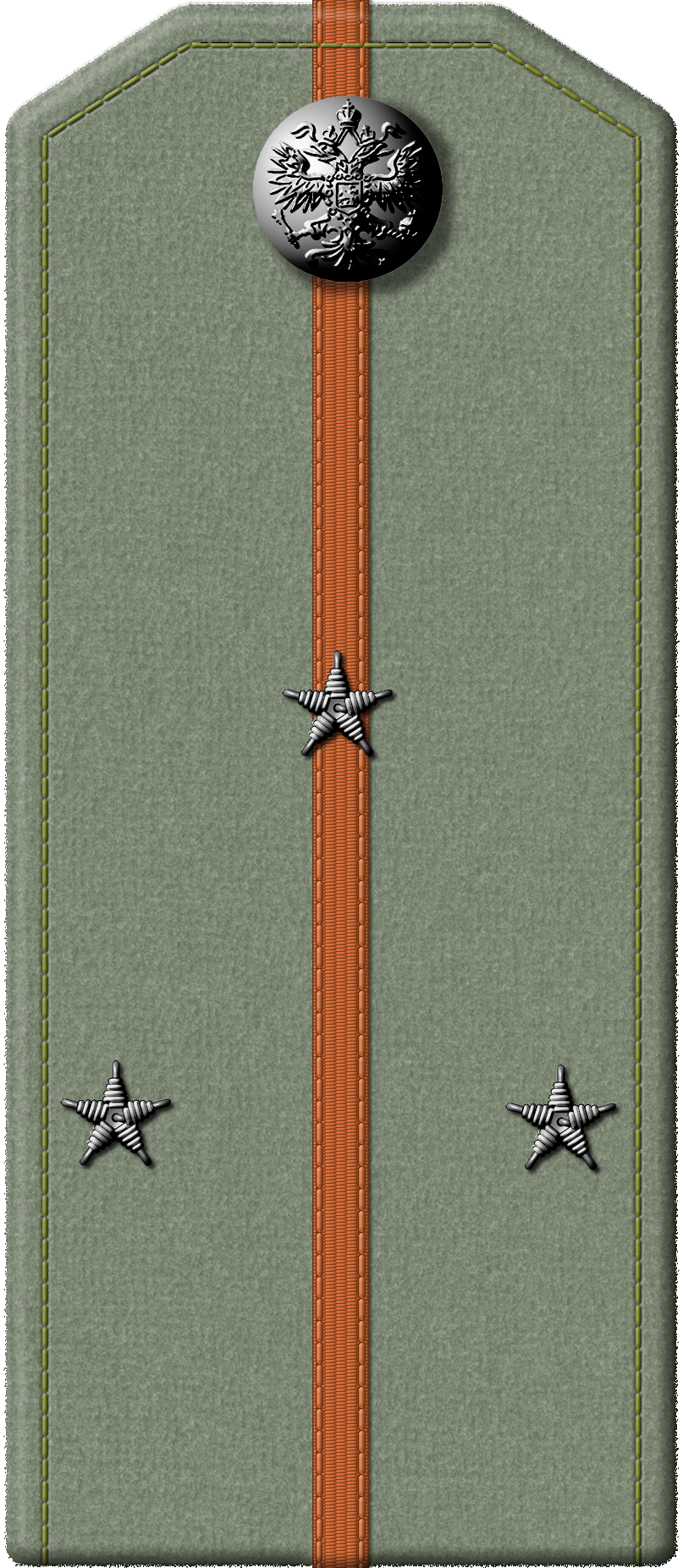
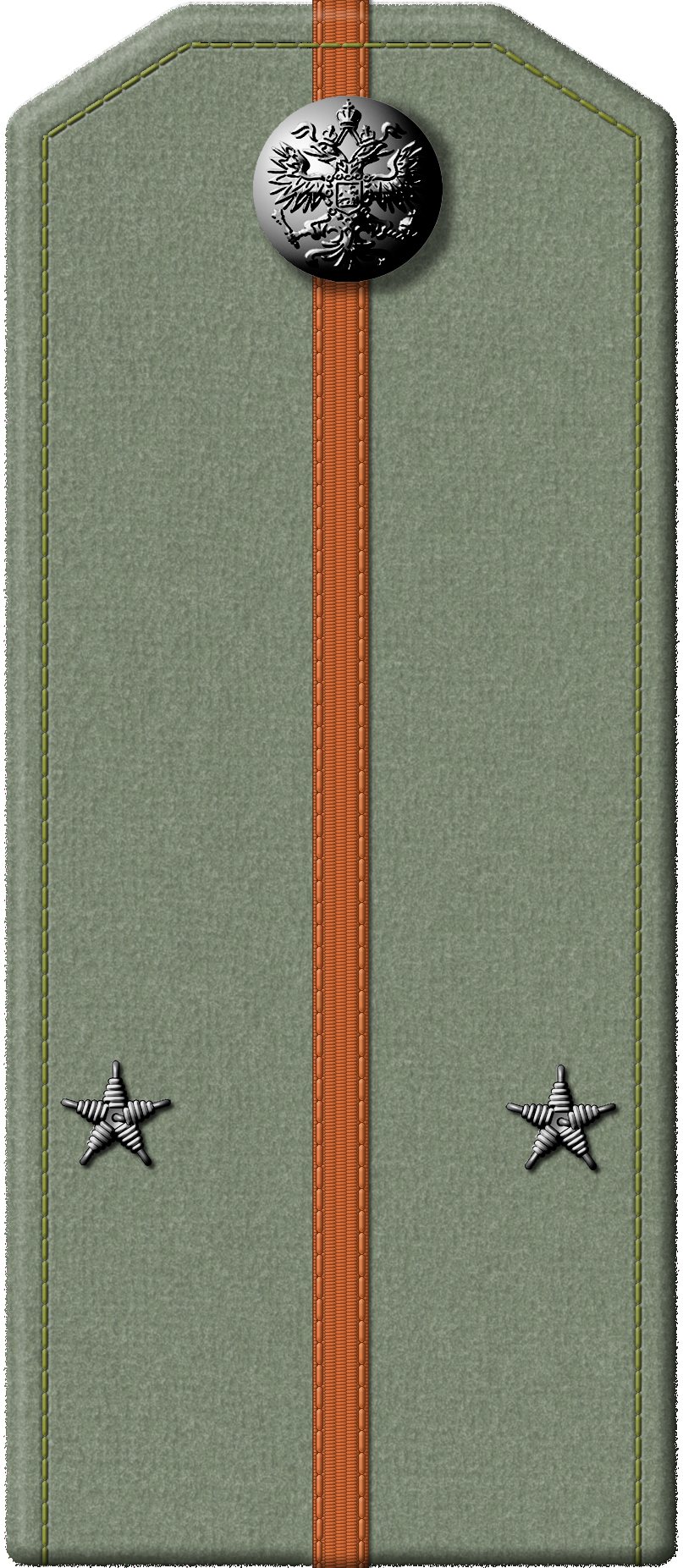
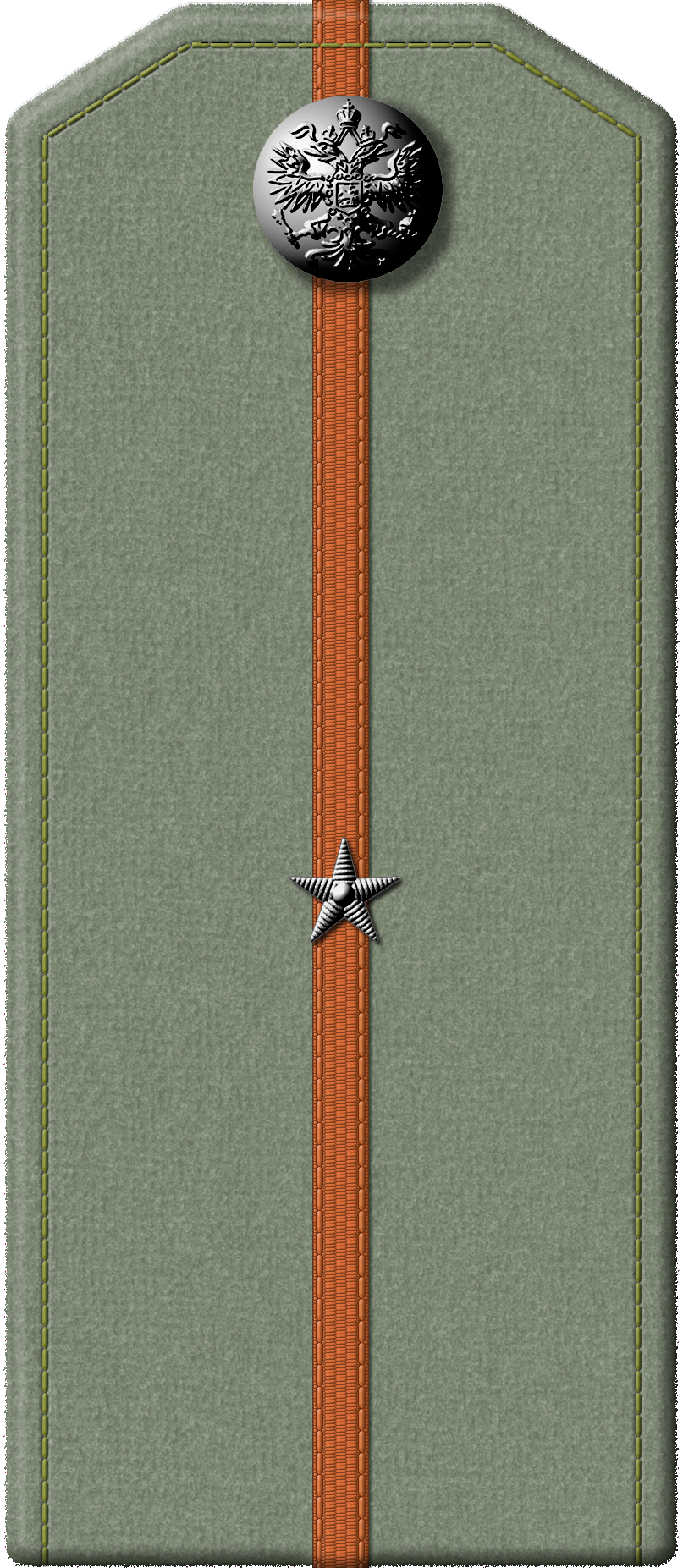
Rank group	General / flag officers			Senior officers		Junior officers
People's Army of Komuch
People's Army of Komuch	Генерал; General	Генерал-лейтенант; General-leytenant	Генерал-майор; General-mayor	Полковник; Polkovnik	Подполковник; Podpolkovnik	Капитан; Kapitan	Штабс капитан Shtabs kapitan	Поручик; Poruchik	Подпоручик; Podporuchik	Прапорщик; Praporshchik
Bashkir Army
Bashkir Army	Генерал; General	Генерал-лейтенант; General-leytenant	Генерал-майор; General-mayor	Полковник; Polkovnik	Подполковник; Podpolkovnik	Капитан; Kapitan	Штабс капитан Shtabs kapitan	Поручик; Poruchik	Подпоручик; Podporuchik	Прапорщик; Praporshchik
Siberian Army
Siberian Army	Генерал; General	Генерал-лейтенант; General-leytenant	Генерал-майор; General-mayor	Полковник; Polkovnik	Подполковник; Podpolkovnik	Капитан; Kapitan	Штабс капитан Shtabs kapitan	Поручик; Poruchik	Подпоручик; Podporuchik	Прапорщик; Praporshchik
Partizan Division of Alekseyev
Partizan Division of Alekseyev	Генерал; General	Генерал-лейтенант; General-leytenant	Генерал-майор; General-mayor	Полковник; Polkovnik	Подполковник; Podpolkovnik	Капитан; Kapitan	Штабс капитан Shtabs kapitan	Поручик; Poruchik	Подпоручик; Podporuchik	Прапорщик; Praporshchik
3rd Rifle Division of Drozdovsky
3rd Rifle Division of Drozdovsky	Генерал; General	Генерал-лейтенант; General-leytenant	Генерал-майор; General-mayor	Полковник; Polkovnik	Подполковник; Podpolkovnik	Капитан; Kapitan	Штабс капитан Shtabs kapitan	Поручик; Poruchik	Подпоручик; Podporuchik	Прапорщик; Praporshchik
Shock Division of Kornilov
Shock Division of Kornilov	Генерал; General	Генерал-лейтенант; General-leytenant	Генерал-майор; General-mayor	Полковник; Polkovnik	Подполковник; Podpolkovnik	Капитан; Kapitan	Штабс капитан Shtabs kapitan	Поручик; Poruchik	Подпоручик; Podporuchik	Прапорщик; Praporshchik
1st Infantry Division of Markov
1st Infantry Division of Markov	Генерал; General	Генерал-лейтенант; General-leytenant	Генерал-майор; General-mayor	Полковник; Polkovnik	Подполковник; Podpolkovnik	Капитан; Kapitan	Штабс капитан Shtabs kapitan	Поручик; Poruchik	Подпоручик; Podporuchik	Прапорщик; Praporshchik
Field Uniform
Field Uniform	Генерал; General	Генерал-лейтенант; General-leytenant	Генерал-майор; General-mayor	Полковник; Polkovnik	Подполковник; Podpolkovnik	Капитан; Kapitan	Штабс капитан Shtabs kapitan	Поручик; Poruchik	Подпоручик; Podporuchik	Прапорщик; Praporshchik
Rank group	General / flag officers			Senior officers		Junior officers

=== Enlisted ===
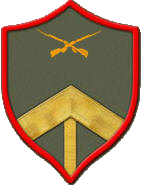
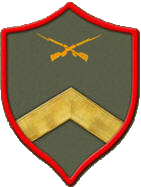
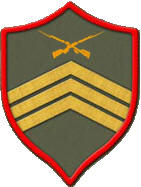
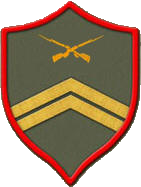
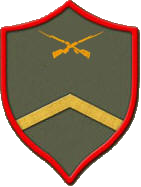
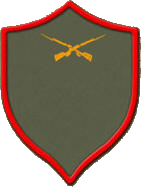
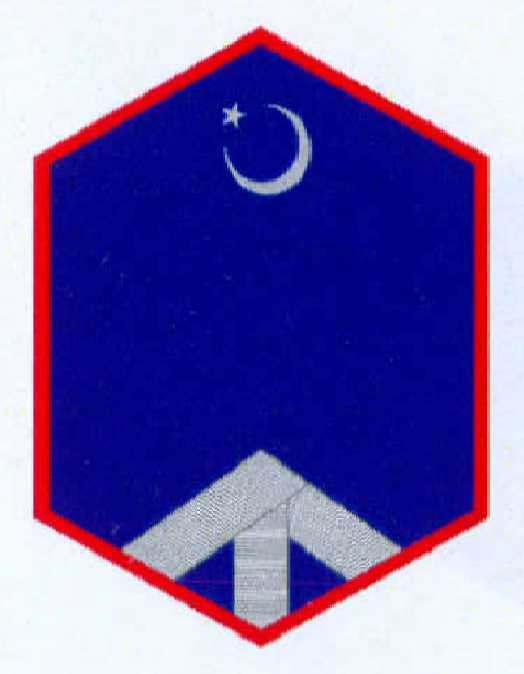
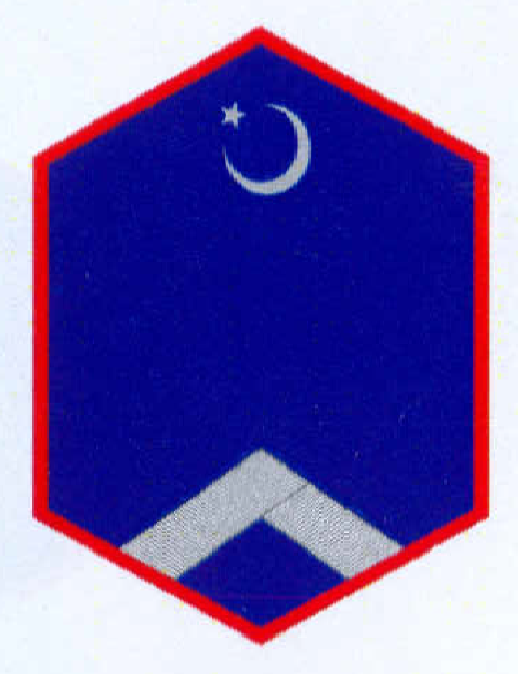
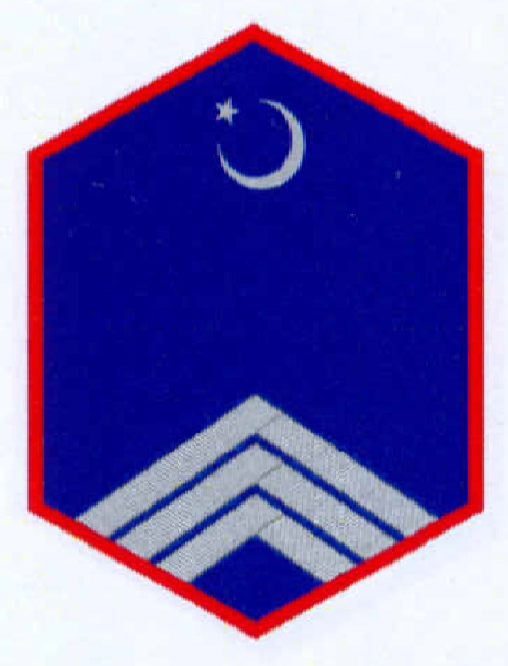
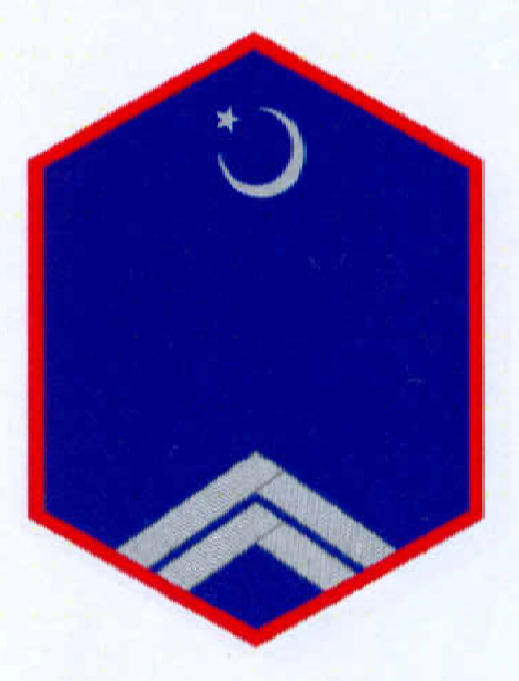
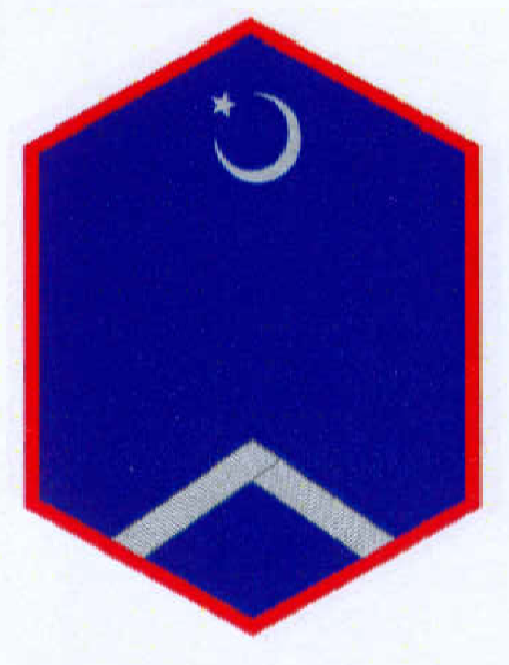
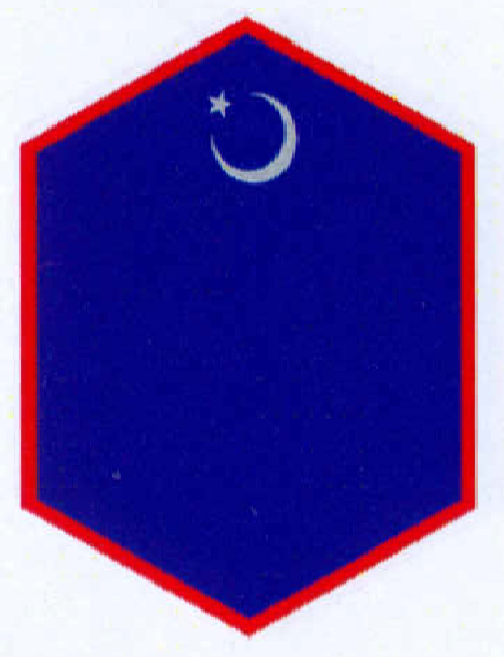
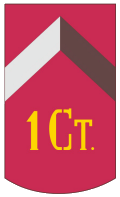
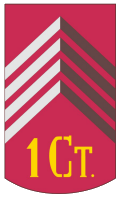
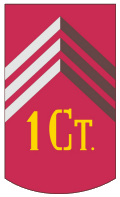
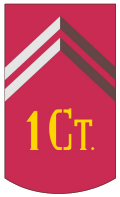
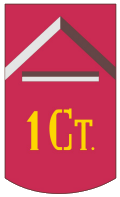
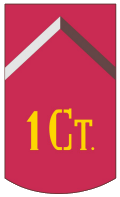
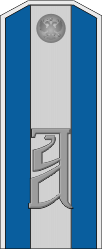
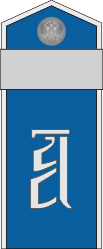
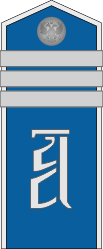
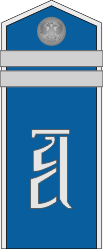
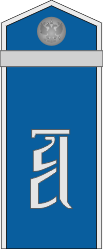
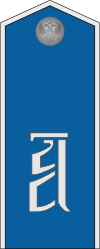
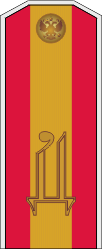
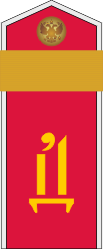
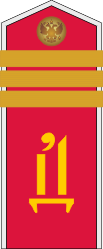
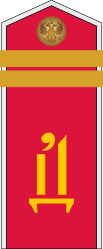
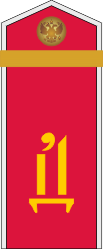
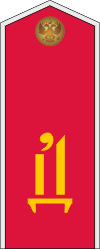
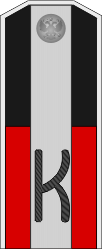
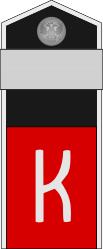
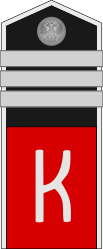
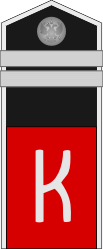
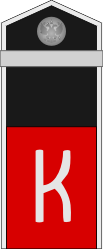
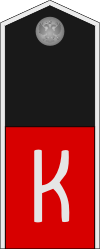
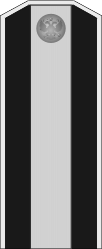
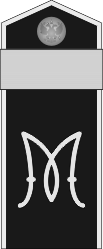
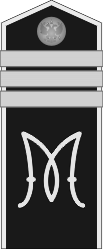
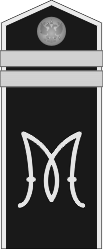
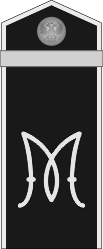
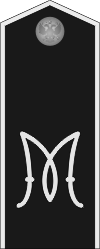
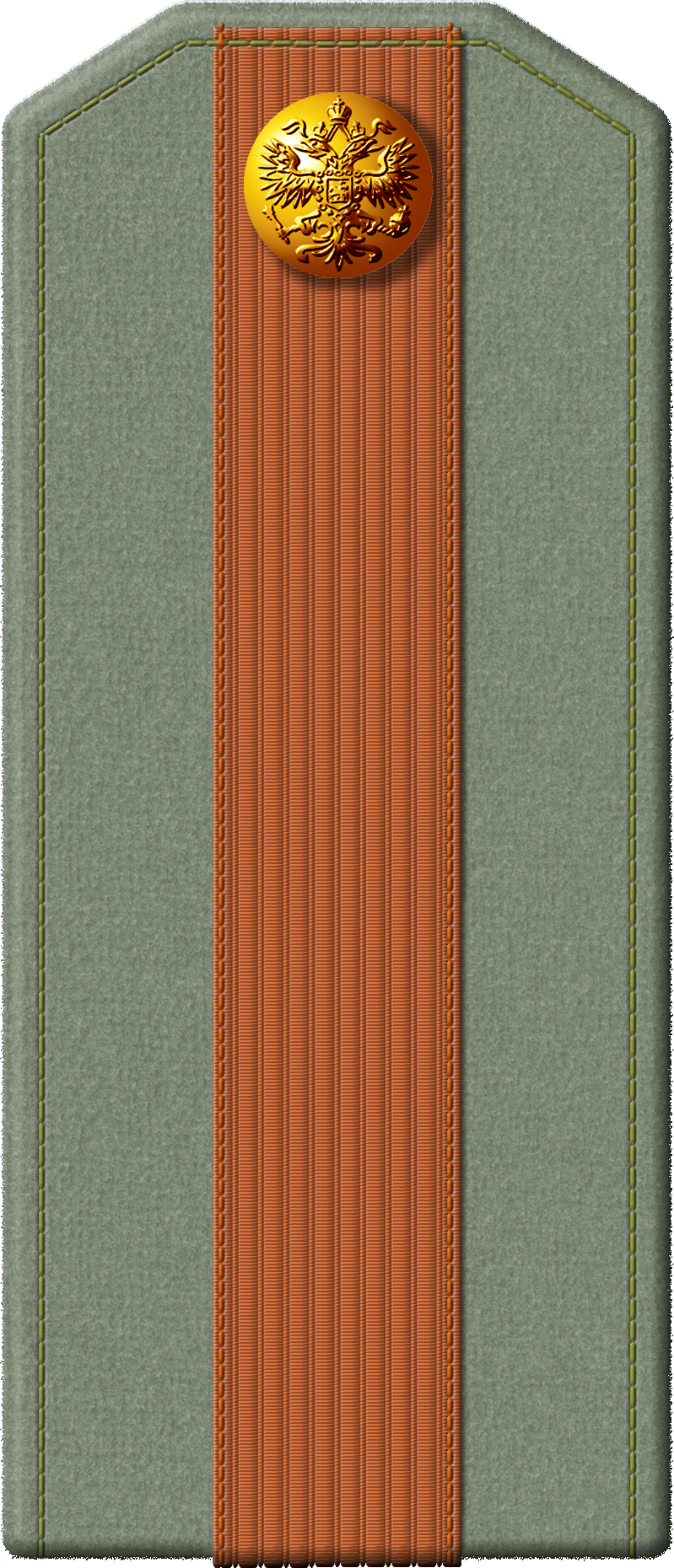
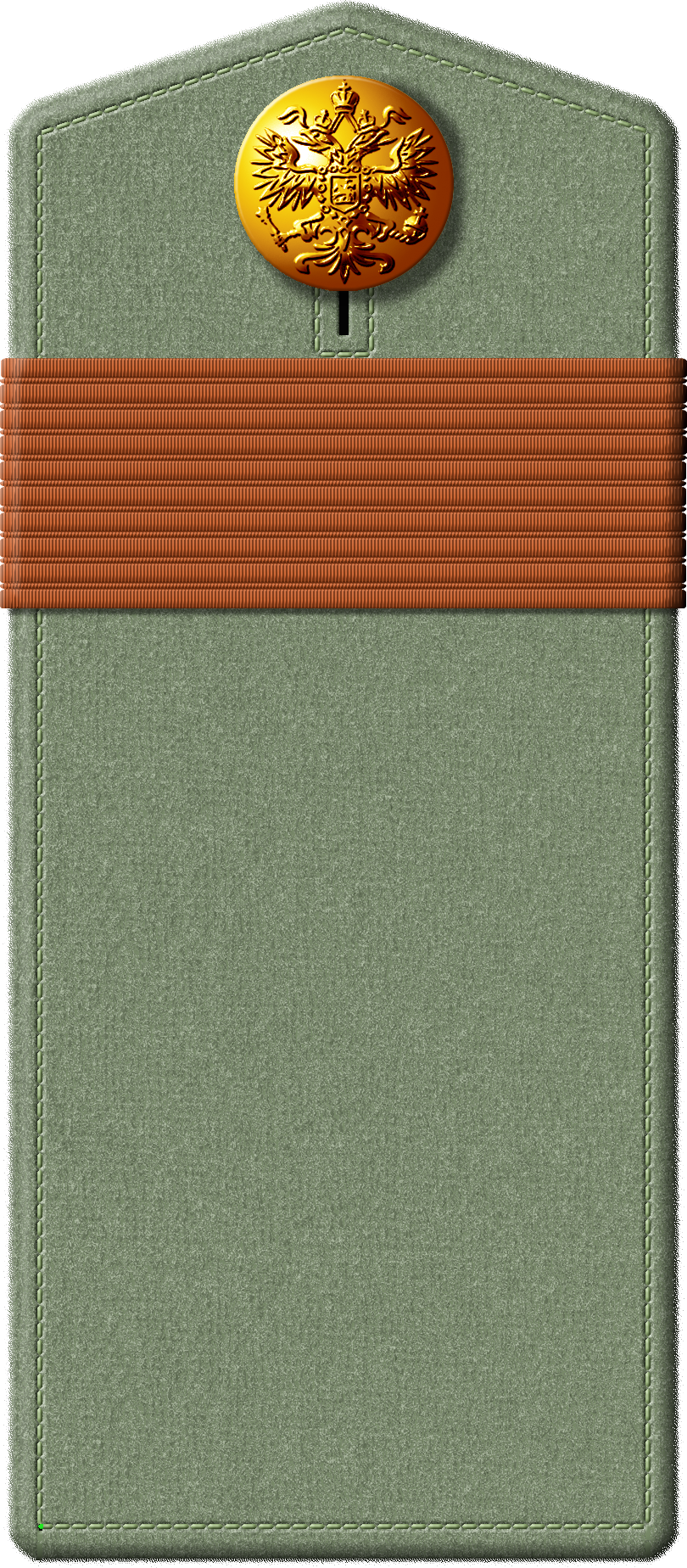
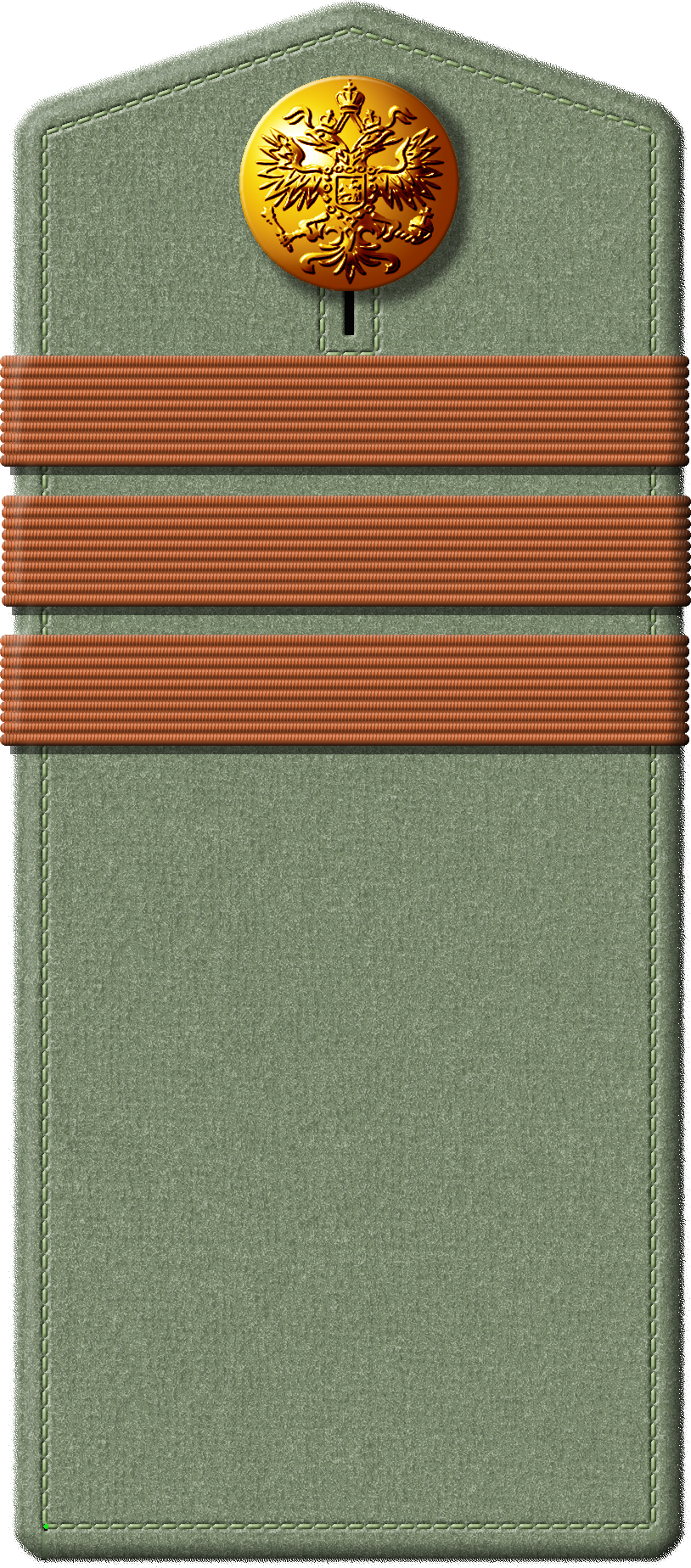
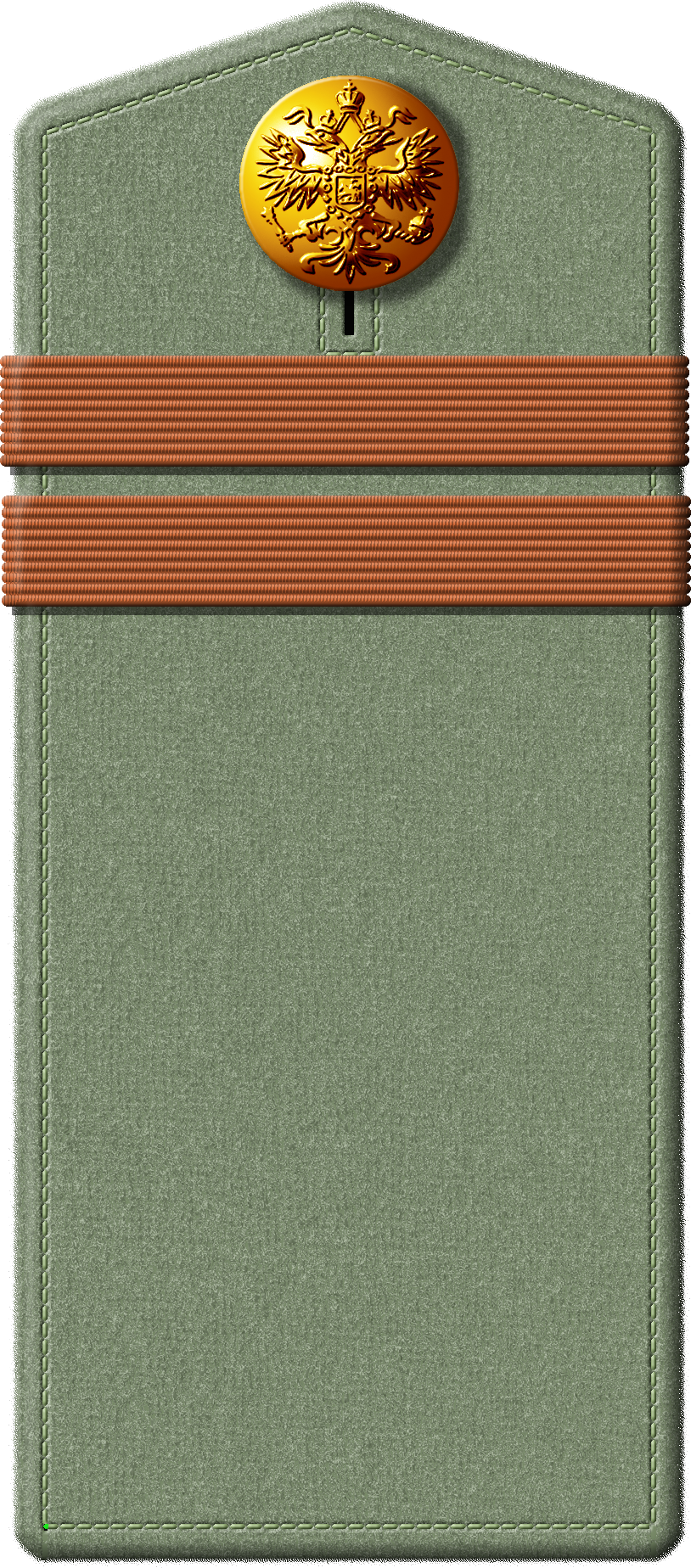
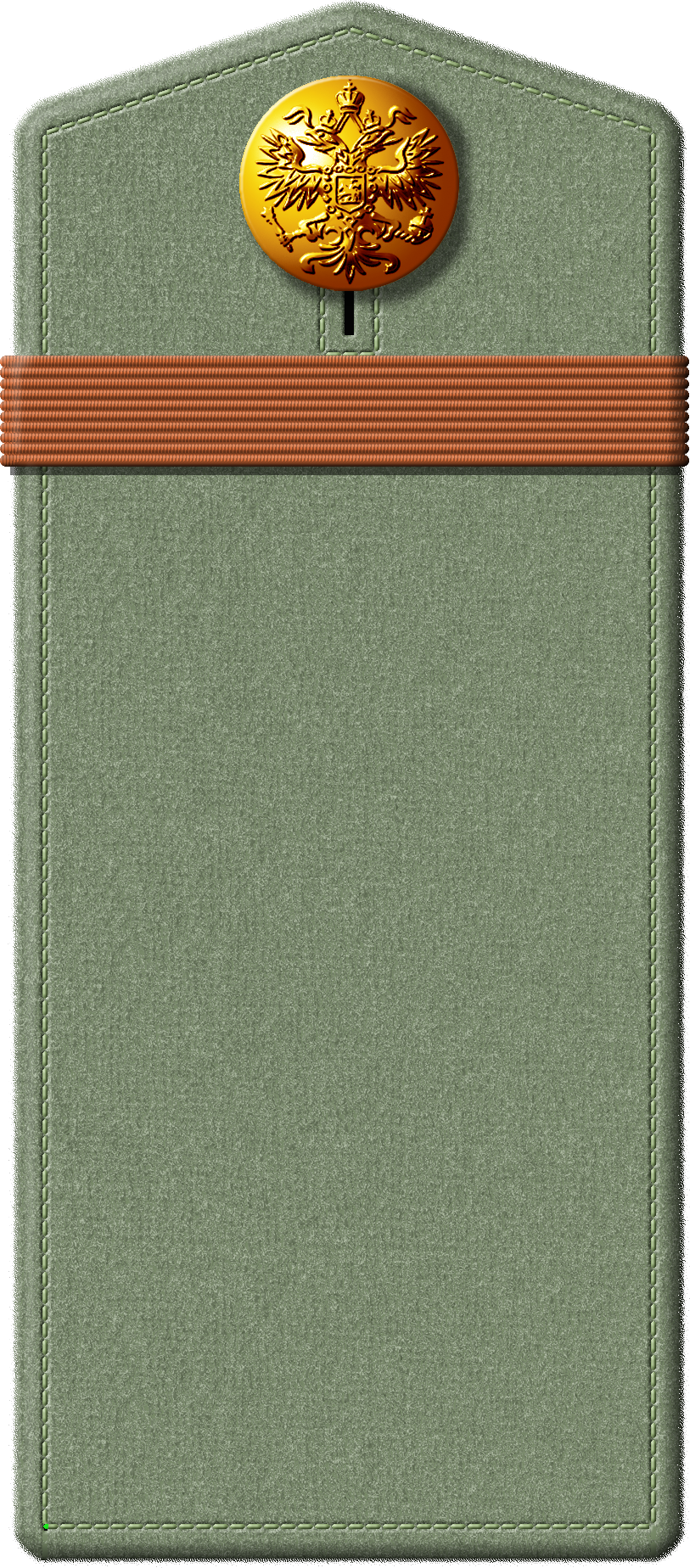
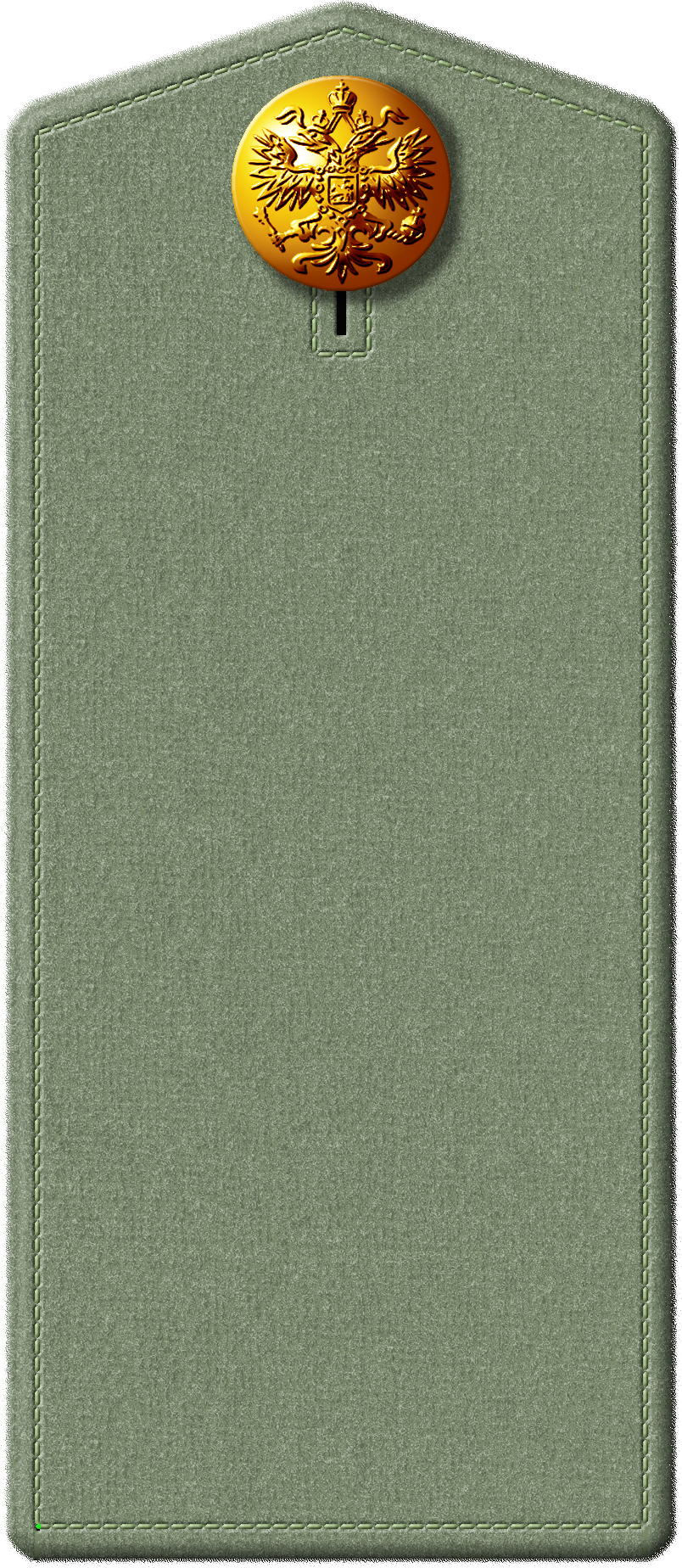
Rank group	Senior NCOs		Junior NCOs		Enlisted
People's Army of Komuch
People's Army of Komuch	Подпрапорщик; Podpraporshtik	Фельдфебель; Fel'dfebel'	Старший унтер-офицер Starshiy unter-ofitser	Младший унтер-офицер Mladshiy unter-ofitser	Ефрейтор; Yefreytor	Рядовой; Ryadovoy
Bashkir Army
Bashkir Army	Подпрапорщик; Podpraporshtik	Фельдфебель; Fel'dfebel'	Старший унтер-офицер Starshiy unter-ofitser	Младший унтер-офицер Mladshiy unter-ofitser	Ефрейтор; Yefreytor	Рядовой; Ryadovoy
Siberian Army
Siberian Army	Подпрапорщик; Podpraporshtik	Фельдфебель; Fel'dfebel'	Старший унтер-офицер Starshiy unter-ofitser	Младший унтер-офицер Mladshiy unter-ofitser	Ефрейтор; Yefreytor	Рядовой; Ryadovoy
Partizan Division of Alekseyev
Partizan Division of Alekseyev	Подпрапорщик; Podpraporshtik	Фельдфебель; Fel'dfebel'	Старший унтер-офицер Starshiy unter-ofitser	Младший унтер-офицер Mladshiy unter-ofitser	Ефрейтор; Yefreytor	Рядовой; Ryadovoy
3rd Rifle Division of Drozdovsky
3rd Rifle Division of Drozdovsky	Подпрапорщик; Podpraporshtik	Фельдфебель; Fel'dfebel'	Старший унтер-офицер Starshiy unter-ofitser	Младший унтер-офицер Mladshiy unter-ofitser	Ефрейтор; Yefreytor	Рядовой; Ryadovoy
Shock Division of Kornilov
Shock Division of Kornilov	Подпрапорщик; Podpraporshtik	Фельдфебель; Fel'dfebel'	Старший унтер-офицер Starshiy unter-ofitser	Младший унтер-офицер Mladshiy unter-ofitser	Ефрейтор; Yefreytor	Рядовой; Ryadovoy
1st Infantry Division of Markov
1st Infantry Division of Markov	Подпрапорщик; Podpraporshtik	Фельдфебель; Fel'dfebel'	Старший унтер-офицер Starshiy unter-ofitser	Младший унтер-офицер Mladshiy unter-ofitser	Ефрейтор; Yefreytor	Рядовой; Ryadovoy
Field Uniform
Field Uniform	Подпрапорщик; Podpraporshtik	Фельдфебель; Fel'dfebel'	Старший унтер-офицер Starshiy unter-ofitser	Младший унтер-офицер Mladshiy unter-ofitser	Ефрейтор; Yefreytor	Рядовой; Ryadovoy
