= Southern Army (1918) =

- Южная армия
- Active: Summer – Autumn 1918 (Transformed into the Voronezh Corps of the Special Southern Army, later as part of the Armed Forces of the South of Russia)
- Country: Russia
- Allegiance: White Army
- Type: Armed formations
- Size: 3,500 bayonets and sabers (October 1918)
- Engagements: Civil War in Russia

Commanders
- Notable commanders: Artillery Adjutant General Nikolai Ivanov

The Southern Army was an operational–strategic formation of the White Guards troops on the Don in the summer and autumn of 1918 during the Civil War.

== Organization and formation of the army ==
The organization of the army began in the summer of 1918 in Kiev, the capital of the Ukrainian State, by the “Nasha Rodina", or "Our Motherland”, union headed by the Colonel of the Life Guards Cavalry Regiment Duke Georgy of Leuchtenberg and attorney at law Mikhail Akatsatov. Recruitment points were opened in Kiev, Poltava, Kharkov, Yekaterinoslav, Zhitomir, Pskov, Mogilev. The army was created on a volunteer basis from monarchist–minded officers, officials, etc.

A significant part in the creation of the army was taken by the Russian General, Ataman of the Great Don Army, Pyotr Krasnov, who provided the southern part of the Voronezh Governorate for its formation.

The formation of the army was financed by the Don Ataman and the treasury of the German occupation forces in Ukraine. Serious assistance was also provided by Hetman Skoropadsky, who transferred to the Southern Army the personnel of the 4th Infantry Division as part of the 13th Infantry Belozersk and 14th Infantry Olonets Regiments and donated 4,5 million rubles for its needs.

Despite the significant efforts of the organizers to attract well–known military leaders to the command, the army was for a long time headed by the chief of staff, General Konstantin Schildbach, under the command of the existent units, General Valerian Semyonov: the Cavalry General, Count Fyodor Keller, reacted extremely negatively to the proposal to lead the army, and Prince Alexander Dolgorukov refused. It was headed by the 67–year–old Artillery Adjutant General Nikolai Ivanov, the former commander–in–chief of the armies of the Southwestern Front, after the army was transferred to the subordination of General Krasnov.

== Composition of the army and its size ==
By the time of the termination of German funding by the fall of 1918, the army consisted of about 3,5 thousand bayonets and sabers.

== Conversion to the Corps of the Special Southern Army ==
After the organizers turned to the Don Ataman for help, the army was completely subordinated to Pyotr Krasnov, who, by order of October 13, 1918, transformed it into the Voronezh Corps (Lieutenant General Prince Nikolai Vadbolsky) of the Special Southern Army, which was tasked with protecting the borders of the Great Don Army. In early November, all three corps of the Special Southern Army, by agreement between Hetman Pavel Skoropadsky and Don Ataman Peter Krasnov, were transferred to the Don Army.

== Disbandment and inclusion in the Armed Forces of the South of Russia ==
After the death of General Nikolai Ivanov, commander of the army, on January 27, 1919, from typhus, in February–March 1919, most of the forces of the Special Southern Army were reorganized and included in the 6th Infantry Division and other units of the Armed Forces of the South of Russia, General Anton Denikin.

According to Peter Kenez, "The Southern army had not one victory to its credit. At the end of December, when one defeat followed another, it was dissolved and about a thousand members later managed to join the Volunteer Army."

== Notable personalities who served in the army ==
- Colonel Pavel Bermondt served as head of the army's Counterintelligence Department and head of its Kiev Recruiting Bureau;
- Lieutenant General Herbert Johnson, Chief of the 2nd Division;
- Leonid Yeletsky, duty general of the headquarters of the Southern Army.

== Sources ==
- Ruslan Gagkuev, Sergei Balmasov. General Keller During the Great War and Russian Troubles // Count Keller. Moscow: Non–Profit Partnership "Posev", 2007. ISBN 5-85824-170-0
- Sergey Volkov. Southern Army
- Library of Literature. 7. Southern Army and the Duke of Leuchtenberg
- White Russia Website
