= Kuban Offensive =

1918 offensive of the Russian Civil War

Second Kuban Campaign
- Part of the Russian Civil War
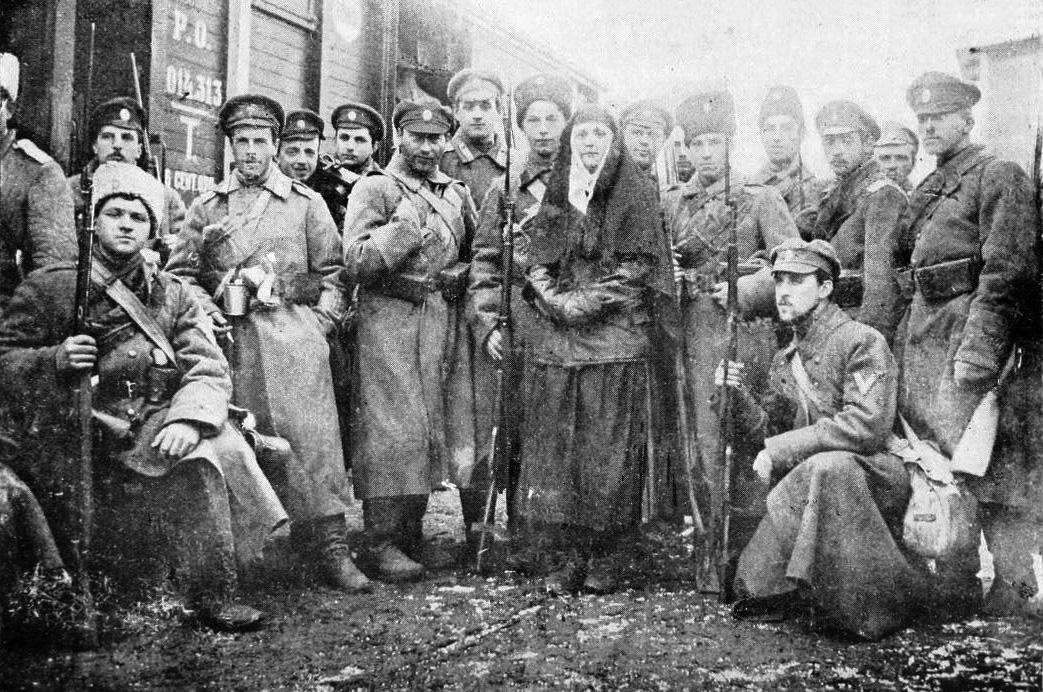
- Volunteer Army infantry company
Date	June 9 (New Style June 22) - November 1918
Location	Kuban
Result	White victory Full results: Destruction of the Caucasian Bolshevik army; Whites invade the North Caucasus; After the campaign, the Whites occupy Crimea and southern Ukraine
Territorial changes	White Army obtains control of the Kuban region

Belligerents
RSFSR	Volunteer Army; Kuban Republic

Commanders and leaders
Ivan Sorokin (executed); Alexei Ivanovich Avtonomov; Ivan Fedko	Anton Denikin; Sergey Markov †; Mikhail Drozdovsky

Units involved
Red Army	White Army

Strength
80,000–100,000 troops (in total); 100 artillery	8,000–9,000 troops 21 artillery (initially)

Casualties and losses
45,000 killed or wounded, almost all the equipment	5,000 killed or missing

The Kuban Offensive, also called the Second Kuban Campaign, was fought between the White and Red Armies during the Russian Civil War. The White Army achieved an important victory despite being numerically inferior in manpower and artillery. It resulted in the capture of Ekaterinodar and Novorossiysk in August 1918 and the conquest of the Western part of Kuban by the White armies. Later in 1918 they took Maykop, Armavir and Stavropol, and extended their authority over the entire Kuban Region.

== The campaign ==
On 28 May, Krasnov and Denikin met at Manychskaia to decide between attacking Tsaritsyn, favored by Krasnov, or Ekaterinodar, favored by Denikin. Krasnov favored Tsaritsyn for is munition factories and railway junction. Denikin favored Ekaterinodar, according to Peter Kenez, because "He had promised the Kuban Cossacks that he would liberate their native district. Denikin made the correct decision because he understood that in May 1918 there was no effective anti-Bolshevik force in Russia aside from the Cossacks." Yet the Volunteer Army consisted of about 9,000 soldiers, and would face more than 75,000 Bolsheviks in the Northern Caucasus, commanded by Alexei Ivanovich Avtonomov. However, at the end of May, Avtonomov was replaced by K. I. Kalnin. Most of the Bolshevik forces were concentrated in the Eisk district, after the Germans occupied Ukraine, Taganrog, Rostov-on-Don, and Bataisk. Kalnin had 10,000 men stationed around Torgovaia and Tikhoretskaia, while his subordinate Ivan Sorokin faced the Germans near Rostov.

On 22 June 1918, the Volunteer Army launched the second Kuban campaign. Denikin left Viktor Pokrovsky's regiment behind to protect his flank against Sorokin, while Denikin made a surprise attack on Trogovaia, on the Tsaritsyn-Ekaterinodar railway. On 25 June, Torgovaia was captured, but with the loss of Denikin's general Sergey Markov. Denikin then constructed armored cars from the trolley cars to protect the railway line. On 6 July, Denikin captured Belaia Glina while Kalnin's Bolsheviks retreated to Tikhoretskaia. Pokrovsky then successfully resisted an attack by Sorokin.

On 14 July, Denikin captured Tikhoretsk, with Borovskii's division attacked from the South and Erdeli's division attacked from the North. Communications between Kalnin and Sorokin were severed, and the Volunteer Army acquired weapons, munitions, rolling stock, and control of a major railway center. On 15 July, Kalnin gave up his command to Sorokin. Denikin attacked Sorokin with 10,00 men under Erdeli, Pokrovsky, and Alexander Kutepov, while Denikin sent Borovskii to attack Kavkazkaia.

On 27 July, Denikin sent Mikhail Drozdovsky towards Ekaterinodar, but at the same time Sorokin occupied Korenovsk, separating Drozdovsky from Denikin. On 7 August, after 11 days, Sorokin surrendered Korenovsk and retreated towards Ekaterinodar. On 16 August, Ekaterinodar was captured, with the entry of the Kuban Rada and Denikin's Volunteer Army. The Republic of the Northern Caucasus Executive Committee, founded on 5 July by the Congress of Soviets in Ekaterinodar, fled to Armavir, then to Pyatigorsk, and finally to Nevinnomyssk.

== Kuban uprising ==
After the victory of the Volunteers, all the Kuban rose up against the Bolsheviks. The stanitsa took up arms one after the other and a wave of alternately Red and White terror swept over the Kuban. General Viktor Pokrovsky, dispatched three months earlier by Denikin to organize the insurgents of the Laba region, captured Maykop and Armavir. The Terek Cossacks also revolted and took Mozdok, cutting Red communications between Stavropol and Vladikavkaz, and besieging Grozny. The Reds did not manage anymore to organize the defense of Ekaterinodar, their troops fleeing before the advance of the Whites. On August 15, the Whites took Ekaterinodar without a fight, followed on August 26 by Novorossiysk.

The campaign then continued along the coast of the Black Sea towards Stavropol, which was taken on November 15, 1918.

Mikhail Drozdovsky was wounded in October 1918 near Stavropol. He never recovered and died on January 1, 1919, in the vicinity of Rostov-on-Don.

== See also ==
- Bibliography of the Russian Revolution and Civil War
- Outline of the Russian Revolution and Civil War
- Index of articles related to the Russian Revolution and Civil War
- The "Russian" Civil Wars, 1916–1926: Ten Years That Shook the World
- Russia in Flames: War, Revolution, Civil War, 1914–1921
- Russia in Revolution: An Empire in Crisis, 1890 to 1928
- Russia: Revolution and Civil War, 1917—1921
- The Russian Revolution: A New History
