= Sergey Markov =

Russian military commander and White movement leader (1878–1918)

Sergey Leonidovich Markov
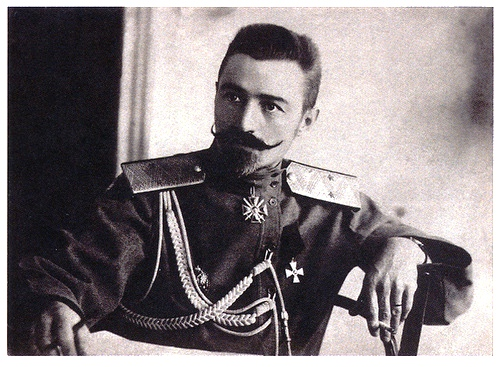
- Markov in 1918
- Born: 19 July 1878; Saint Petersburg Governorate, Russian Empire
- Died: 25 June 1918 (aged 39) near Salsk, Russian Republic
- Military career
- Allegiance: Russian Empire; Russian Republic
- Branch: (Russian Empire) Imperial Russian Army (Russian Republic) White Army
- Service years: 1904–1918
- Conflicts: Russo-Japanese War; World War I Russian Civil War †

Sergey Leonidovich Markov (Russian: Сергей Леонидович Марков; 19 July [O.S. 7 July] 1878 – 25 June 1918) was an Imperial Russian Army general, and became one of the founders of the Volunteer Army counterrevolutionary force of the White movement in southern Russia during the Russian Civil War which broke out in 1917.

== Biography ==
Sergey Markov was born in Saint Petersburg Guberniya. Markov was a career officer, he graduated from the General Staff Academy, St. Petersburg in 1904 and fought in the Russo-Japanese War and was decorated with Order of St. Vladimir.

Between 1911 and 1914, he taught at the Academy, renamed to Imperial Nicholas Military Academy. During the First World War, Markov fought under command of General Denikin and was decorated with Order of St. George for bravery.

After the February Revolution of 1917, Markov was first promoted to the commander of South-Western front, but later dismissed from his post and arrested because of his support for General Lavr Kornilov during the Kornilov Affair. On November 19, 1917, Markov escaped from prison and together with generals Denikin and Kornilov, he raised the Volunteer Army in the Don region.

On 25 June 1918, during the Kuban Offensive, Markov was fatally wounded when the Volunteer Army captured Torgovaia.

== See also ==
- Volunteer Army
- Russian Civil War
