= Donbas operation (1919) =

Donbas operation of 1919
- Part of the Southern Front of the Russian Civil War
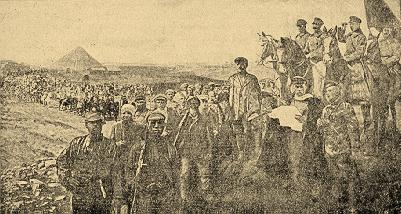
- Reproduction of Vasil Vasilovich Zhuravlov's painting Liberation of Donbas from 1919
Date	18 December 1919 – 6 January 1920
Location	Donbas, eastern Ukraine
Result	Red Army victory

Belligerents
South Russia; Almighty Don Host; Kuban People's Republic	Russian Soviet Republic; Ukrainian Socialist Soviet Republic

Commanders and leaders
Sergei Ulagay; Andrei Shkuro	Semyon Budyonny; Grigori Sokolnikov; Anatoliy Gekker

Units involved
Armed Forces of South Russia: Don Army; Caucasus Army; Volunteer Army	Southern Front: 8th Army; 13th Army; 1st Cavalry Army; Partisans in occupied white territories

Strength
8,000 men, 24 artillery guns 170 machine guns 5 armored trains	3,000 men

Casualties and losses
3,000 killed 5,000 captured	Unknown

The Donbas operation of 1919 was a military campaign of the Russian Civil War, in which the Southern Front of the Red Army regained control of the Donbas region from the Armed Forces of South Russia.

== Prelude ==
Since the White victory during the battle for the Donbas in June 1919, the region had remained in the hands of the Armed Forces of South Russia, under the command of Vladimir May-Mayevsky and Andrei Shkuro. The Reds tried to regain Donbas in August 1919, but the offensive, in which the 8th and 13th Red Armies took part, only managed to reach Kupiansk. The aim of the Donbas operation was to regain this area, destroy the White troops and prevent them from retreating to the area of the former Donbas District.

After the victory of Semyon Budyonny's cavalry at Voronezh and Kastornoye, in October and November, and then the recapture of the Ukrainian Soviet capital of Kharkiv, on 11 December, the Red Army advanced rapidly south. Until the fall of Kharkiv, the Whites had retreated in an organized and orderly manner, but after losing this city, their retreat turned into a disorderly escape, the more so as the wounded and those suffering from typhus were moving along with the soldiers. On 16 December, the Red Army reached the line of Kupiansk-Svatove-Bilolutsk.

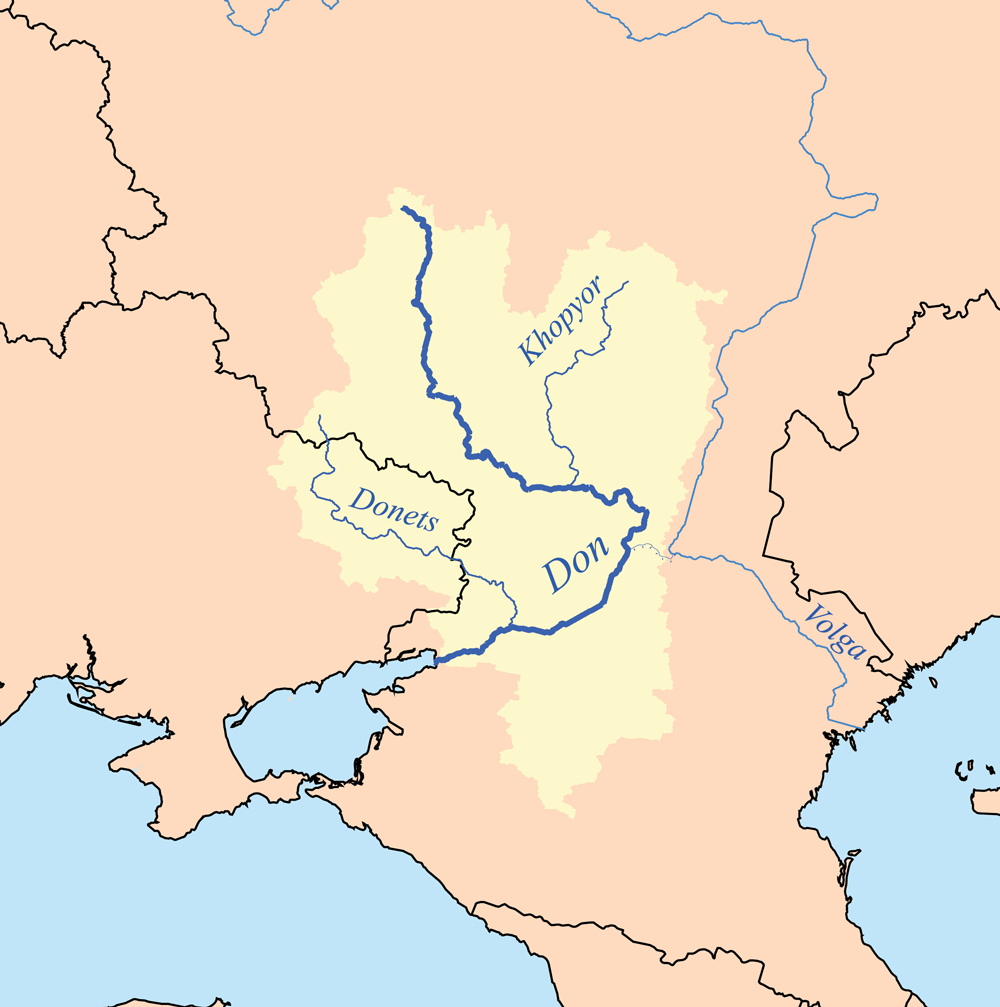
Location of the Donets River

In order to prevent the Reds from crossing the Donets, the Whites managed to concentrate in the region a grouping consisting of Pavlov's 4th Don Corps, Sergei Ulagay's 2nd Kuban Corps, Andrei Shkuro's 3rd Kuban Corps and Chesnokov's 3rd Cavalry Division. The main strike of the Donbas operation was to be carried out by the 1st Cavalry Army, striking towards the railway stations Popasna and Ilovaisk and Debaltseve. At the same time, some of the Red forces were tasked with hitting Taganrog, to prevent the Whites from retreating east and cut their area in half. Anatoliy Gekker's 13th Army was to perform a supporting attack in the direction of Sloviansk and Yuzivka, while Grigory Sokolnikov's 8th Army was entrusted with the task of capturing Luhansk.

== Offensive ==
The Red Army offensive began on 18 December 1919. The 1st Cavalry Army crossed the Donets on 23 December, followed soon after by the 13th Army. A group of White soldiers concentrated in the vicinity of Bakhmut and Popasna in order to throw the enemy beyond the river and go to the defense, but this goal was not achieved. On 25 December, the 1st Cavalry Army went on the offensive again. Ulagay's forces were completely smashed, with Anton Denikin later being informed that the Whites no longer had cavalry. Two days later, the Red Army captured Luhansk, a day later the Whites had to leave Bakhmut, on 29 December, they also left Debaltseve. On 30 December, the Reds also captured Horlivka, breaking the last attempt by the Whites to defend their positions.

The last points of White control in Donbas - Ilovaisk, Amvrosiivka, Diakiv and Rovenky - were captured on 1 January 1920. Having suffered considerable losses, the Whites withdrew in direction of Crimea and Rostov-on-Don. Morale in their ranks was extremely low after the recent defeats and conflicts between the White commanders. Continuing its march south, on 6 January 1920, the Red Army seized Mariupol and Taganrog, reaching the Black Sea, thereby cutting off White forces in Crimea and the Odesa region from the rest of Denikin's troops in the Don region and in the North Caucasus. Thanks to this success, in the following days it was possible to carry out an operation into the Don region and capture Novocherkassk on 7 January and Rostov-on-Don on 9 January.

== See also ==
- Bibliography of the Russian Revolution and Civil War
- Outline of the Russian Revolution and Civil War
- Index of articles related to the Russian Revolution and Civil War
- The "Russian" Civil Wars, 1916–1926: Ten Years That Shook the World
- Russia in Flames: War, Revolution, Civil War, 1914–1921
- Russia in Revolution: An Empire in Crisis, 1890 to 1928
- Russia: Revolution and Civil War, 1917—1921
- The Russian Revolution: A New History

== Bibliography ==
- Kenez, Peter (2004). Red Advance, White Defeat. Civil War in South Russia 1919-1920. Washington DC: New Academia Publishing. ISBN 0974493457.
- Mawdsley, Evan (2010). Wojna domowa w Rosji 1917–1920 (in Polish). Translated by Monika Popławska. Warsaw: Bellona. ISBN 978-83-11-11638-2. OCLC 750846354.
- Smele, J. D. (2015). The "Russian" Civil Wars 1916-1926. Ten Years That Shook the World. London: C. Hurst & Co. ISBN 9781849047210.
