= Kharkiv Operation (December 1919) =

Offensive operation

- Part of the Southern Front of the Russian Civil War
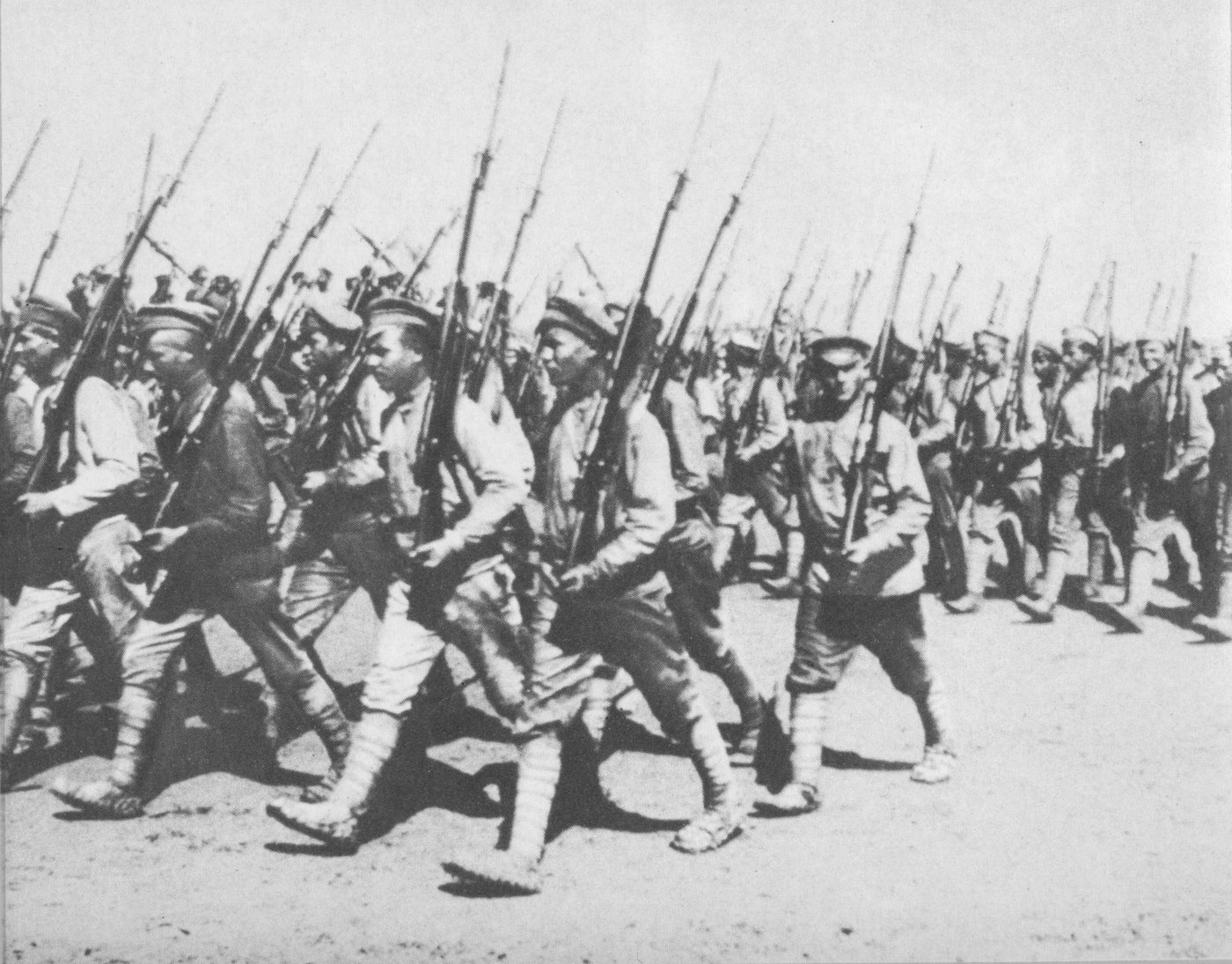
- Parade of the Red Army in Kharkiv
Date	24 November – 12 December 1919
Location	Kharkiv, Ukraine 49°59′33″N 36°13′52″E
Result	Soviet victory

Belligerents
South Russia; Don Republic	Russian SFSR; Ukrainian SSR

Commanders and leaders
Anton Denikin; Vladimir May-Mayevsky; Sergei Ulagay; Konstantin Mamontov	Alexander Yegorov; Anatoliy Gekker; Semyon Budyonny; Ieronim Uborevich; Grigori Sokolnikov

Units involved
Armed Forces of South Russia: Volunteer Army; Don Army	Southern Front: 8th Army; 13th Army; 14th Army; 1st Cavalry Army

Strength
47,000 infantry 23,000 cavalry 227 artillery cannons 1,600 machine guns	58,000 infantry 13,000 cavalry 455 artillery cannons 1,660 machine guns

The Kharkiv operation (24 November – 12 December 1919) was an offensive during the Russian Civil War by the Southern Front of the Red Army under the command of Alexander Yegorov against the White Guard troops of Anton Denikin.

== Prelude ==
In October 1919, the Red Army launched a counter-offensive against the Armed Forces of South Russia, in order to stop their advance on Moscow and to regain the territories lost in the previous two months. On 13–20 October, the Reds forced Vladimir May-Mayevsky's Volunteer Army to withdraw from the Russian capital to Kursk. On 24 October, Semyon Budyonny's cavalry corps (later transformed into the 1st Cavalry Army) defeated the White cavalry of Andrei Shkuro and Konstantin Mamontov near Voronezh. A fierce battle for the Kastornoye railway junction lasted for almost a month, finally ending with the victory of the Reds. On 15 November, the Red Army recaptured Kursk from the Whites. These successes opened the way for the Reds to continue their march south towards Kharkiv, which had been captured by the Whites in June 1919. The command of the Red Army set the Southern Front with the task of finally liquidating the Volunteer Army.

== Battle ==
On 23 November, Red forces occupied the Rylsk-Lgov-Kursk-Tim-Kastornoye line and developed a general advance towards Kharkiv and Kupiansk. The main strike towards Kharkiv was carried out by the 14th Army under the command of Ieronim Uborevich and the 13th Army under the command of Anatoly Gekker. The 13th Army was also entrusted with the task of capturing Kupiansk, in cooperation with Budyonny's Cavalry Army. The 8th Army was to secure their actions by attacking in the direction of Starobilsk.

The Whites attempted a counterattack at the junction of the 13th Army and the 1st Cavalry Army, concentrating the cavalry corps of Konstantin Mamontov and Sergei Ulagay in the area of Volchansk and Valuyki. However, on 28 November, the Reds went on a counter-offensive, occupying Sumy-Oboyan-Stary Oskol-Ostrogozhsk-Liski-Bobrov line, while the 1st Cavalry Army and the 13th Army moved far ahead, capturing Novy Oskol. On 3–7 December, a fierce battle between the red and white cavalry took place, which ultimately ended with the success of the 1st Cavalry Army. By 9 December, the 13th Army captured Volchansk, the 1st Cavalry Army captured Volokonovka and Valuyki, and the 8th Army captured Biryuch. Meanwhile, the 14th Army broke through the White defenses between Okhtyrka and Grayvoron, capturing Belgorod, Bohodukhiv and Valky. On 11 December, the 14th Army occupied Merefa and cut off the Whites' escape route to the south.

At the same time, the 13th Army bypassed Kharkiv and first captured Kupiansk, located to the east of it. By 12 December, Kharkiv itself had been captured by the 14th Army. The 1st Cavalry Army withdrew towards Svatove and occupied it on 17 December, preventing the Whites from leaving Kharkiv to the east. The entry of the Bolsheviks into Kharkiv was received rather favourably by the local inhabitants. In June 1919, they had welcomed the Whites in the hope of improving the economic situation in the city, counting on overcoming difficulties in supplying Kharkiv with food and restarting closed industrial plants. However, by August 1919, the population, especially the workers, became disillusioned with the rule of the Whites. Particular anger was aroused by rumours that Anton Denikin intended to give power in the city to Andrei Shkuro, who aroused widespread terror.

After the fall of Kharkiv, the hitherto disciplined retreat of the Volunteer Army towards the Don and the North Caucasus turned into a disorderly flight; civilians favouring them withdrew together with the whites, and an epidemic of typhus broke out among those retreating. On the other hand, the Reds' victory in the Battle of Kharkiv enabled them to continue their march south and recapture Donbas, which also took place at the turn of 1919 and 1920.

== See also ==
- Bibliography of the Russian Revolution and Civil War
- Outline of the Russian Revolution and Civil War
- Index of articles related to the Russian Revolution and Civil War
- The "Russian" Civil Wars, 1916–1926: Ten Years That Shook the World
- Russia in Flames: War, Revolution, Civil War, 1914–1921
- Russia in Revolution: An Empire in Crisis, 1890 to 1928
- Russia: Revolution and Civil War, 1917—1921
- The Russian Revolution: A New History

== Bibliography ==
- Kenez, Peter (2004). Red Advance, White Defeat. Civil War in South Russia 1919–1920. Washington DC: New Academia Publishing. ISBN 0974493457.
- Smele, J. D. (2015). The "Russian" Civil Wars 1916-1926. Ten Years That Shook the World. London: C. Hurst & Co. ISBN 9781849047210.
