= Northern Taurida Operation =

Military campaign of the Russian Civil War

- Part of the Southern Front of the Russian Civil War
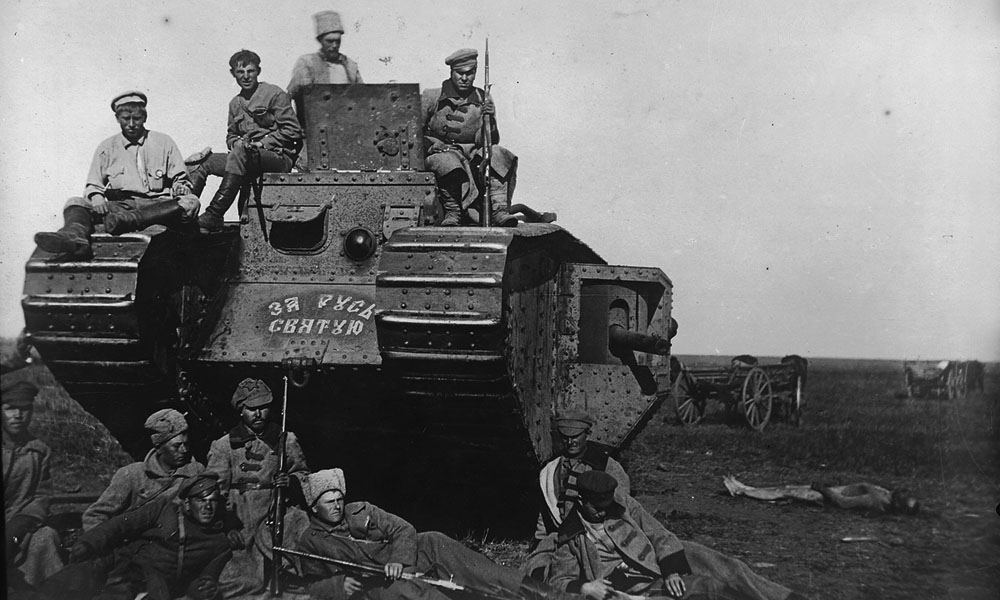
- A British-made Mark IV tank captured from the White Army by the Red Army in the Kakhovka bridgehead, 14 October 1920.
Date	6 June – 3 November 1920
Location	Tavria, Southern Ukraine
Result	Soviet-Makhnovist victory: Whites fall back to Crimea; Beginning of the Siege of Perekop

Belligerents
South Russia	Russian SFSR; Ukrainian SSR; Makhnovshchina

Commanders and leaders
Pyotr Wrangel (Russia) Yakov Slashchov (until August 1920); Alexander Kutepov	Mikhail Frunze; August Kork; Ieronim Uborevich; Nestor Makhno; Semen Karetnyk

Units involved
Russian Army; 1st Army Corps; 2nd Army Corps	Southern Front; 6th Army; 13th Army; 1st Cavalry Army; 2nd Cavalry Army; Revolutionary Insurgent Army of Ukraine

Strength
35,000; 23,000 infantry; 12,000 cavalry	133,100; 99,500 infantry; 33,600 cavalry; 2,000 cavalry

Casualties and losses
Heavy	Heavy

The Northern Taurida operation (6 June – 3 November 1920) was a military campaign in the Russian Civil War between the Red Army and the White Army under Pyotr Wrangel for the possession of Northern Taurida. The campaign can be divided into three stages: the White offensive (6 June – 3 July), trench warfare around the Kakhovka Bridgehead (20 August – 27 October) and the counterattack of the Red Army (28 October – 3 November).

== Prelude ==
In the course of the successive phases of the North Caucasus Operation in February-March 1920, the Red Army pushed the Armed Forces of South Russia out of the Northern Caucasus and Kuban. At the end of March, 35,000 White soldiers evacuated from Novorossiysk on British ships to Crimea. On 4 April 1920, Pyotr Wrangel became the new commander of the Armed Forces of South Russia and, on 11 May 1920, he reorganized it into the Russian Army.

Realizing the huge advantage of the Reds in the Civil War, Wrangel decided to take offensive actions, using the Red Army's involvement in Polish-Soviet War and the fact that the Red Army's Southern Front had been weakened in connection with it. The fight against Poland was directed by 1st Cavalry Army, leaving only the 6th and 13th Red Armies, along with the 2nd Cavalry Army, on the Southern Front. Meanwhile, by June 1920, Wrangel had mobilized about 40,000 soldiers under his command.

== White offensive ==
Wrangel's plan was to leave Crimea and conquer Northern Taurida, which would make it easier to feed his army and strengthen its defensive positions. On 6 June 1920, the 2nd Army Corps under the command of Yakov Slashchov landed at Kyrylivka on the shore of the Sea of Azov, at the rear of the 13th Red Army. At the same time, the 1st Army Corps commanded by Alexander Kutepov tied down the main forces of the enemy by crossing the Isthmus of Perekop, while the corps of Piotr Pisarev, composed mainly of Kuban Cossacks, attacked the reds from the direction of Chonhar. The White forces managed to surprise the Reds and forced the 13th Red Army to retreat. Over the next few days, Pisarev's troops captured Melitopol, while the 1st Army Corps reached Oleksandrivsk and threatened Katerynoslav. The Whites captured 8,000 prisoners, 30 artillery cannons and two armoured trains. The commander of the Russian Army, however, decided not to continue his march north, knowing that the 13th Army had not yet been defeated and that his own troops were still too weak to continue. Instead, Wrangel hoped to further expand his troops in the captured territory, twice as large as that controlled when they had first evacuated to Crimea.

At the end of June, the command of the 13th Army directed a cavalry corps under the command of Dmitry Zhloba against the 1st Army Corps, tasking it with cutting off the White forces participating in the operation from Crimea. But Zhloba's poor leadership allowed the Whites to achieve a decisive victory; in the area of Tokmak and the German settlements of Lindenau and Heidelberg, Zhloba's forces were completely destroyed. In July 1920, Wrangel decided to only send two small units to Pryazovia. The first group of 1,000 people landed east of Mariupol and briefly took the Nikolaevskaya riverside hostel before being defeated by the Reds. The second group of 800 people managed to recruit a further 700 volunteers, and for several weeks conducted guerrilla warfare against the Bolsheviks, ultimately failing.

== Kakhovka Bridgehead ==
On 7 August 1920, units of the 13th Army commanded by Roberts Eidemanis crossed the Dnieper near the village of Kakhovka, to create a bridgehead on the left bank of the river, stop the expected further White offensive actions, and then force them to fall back to Crimea.

=== Removal of General Slashchov ===
Despite his success in the initial stage of the operation, General Yakov Slashchov was removed from command of the 2nd Army Corps in August 1920 by General Wrangel. The official reason was the need for rest and treatment, but historians point to growing strategic disagreements between the two commanders and Slashchov's eccentric behavior, exacerbated by his addiction to drugs. At the same time, Wrangel recognized Slashchov's merits in defending Crimea by awarding him the honorary title "Slashchov-Krymsky" (Slashchov of the Crimea).

After the victory of the Polish troops in Battle of Warsaw and the retreat of the Red Army from Poland, the situation on the Southern Front completely changed to the detriment of the Whites. The break-up of white forces in North Taurida and Crimea became one of the main goals of the Bolshevik government, along with the conclusion of a peace treaty with Poland. On 19 August 1920, the Bolshevik Politburo identified the front of the fight against Wrangel as their main threat. Meanwhile, in the first half of September, Slashchov's 2nd Army Corps managed to move along the northern coast of the Sea of Azov and, on 15 September, it captured Mariupol.

On 27 September, Mikhail Frunze was appointed commander of the Southern Front and he ordered Semyon Budyonny's 1st Cavalry Army to join the Front. The arrival of Budyonny on the left bank of the Dnieper was expected in mid-October 1920. The Bolsheviks also managed to form an agreement with Nestor Makhno's Revolutionary Insurgent Army of Ukraine. In this situation, Wrangel ordered an attempt to liquidate the Kakhovka bridgehead before the 1st Cavalry Army joined the fighting. He decided not to withdraw to Crimea, lest his soldiers panic at the desperation of the situation. On 6 October, a group of troops under the command of Daniil Dracenko crossed the Dnieper near Khortytsia and briefly took Nikopol, but the first effect of surprise was quickly executed. Errors made by Dracenko eventually led to his defeat and forced his retreat to the left bank of the Dnieper on 13 October. The next day, the White's defeat ended the attack on the Kakhovka bridgehead.

== Red counteroffensive ==
A map of the Soviet plan for the Siege of Perekop.

The advantage of the Red Southern Front over Wrangel's forces at the end of October 1920 was more than threefold. The Reds counted over 133,000 soldiers (99,000 infantry and 33,000 cavalry), while the Whites numbered 35,000 (over 23,000 infantry and nearly 12,000 cavalry). They also had a decisive advantage in the number of machine guns. On 28 October 1920, units of the 6th Red Army under the command of August Kork and the 1st Cavalry Army under the command of Semyon Budyonny attacked the Whites from the Kakhovka bridgehead and broke the White defenses. On 29 October, the 51st Rifle Division commanded by Vasily Blyukher reached the Isthmus of Perekop, making it impossible for the Whites to retreat to Crimea through there. On 30 October, units of the 1st Cavalry Army captured the rostrum of Salkove, which meant that it was also impossible for Wrangel's soldiers to cross the Chonhar Strait. In the first days of November, the cavalry corps of Ivan Barbovich conducted a successful counterattack against the 1st Cavalry Army, throwing them out of Salkove and Rozhdestvenskoye, thanks to which the Whites managed to depart for Crimea. On 3 November, the Reds seized Salkove and Chonhar again, but were repelled from Crimea itself. In other sections of the front, however, the Reds did not achieve similarly quick successes. The march of the 2nd Cavalry Army under the command of Filipp Mironov was stopped by the Don Cossack cavalry. Similarly, the 13th Army, coming from the east, encountered more serious resistance from the 1st Kutepov Corps in the Melitopol region. As a result, the Red Army failed to completely break up the White movement or surround it in Northern Taurida.

Due to the fact that severe frosts started in Northern Taurida at the end of October, the Reds could not postpone further actions. On 7 November, the attack on the fortifications of Crimea began.

== See also ==
- Bibliography of the Russian Revolution and Civil War
- Outline of the Russian Revolution and Civil War
- Index of articles related to the Russian Revolution and Civil War
- The "Russian" Civil Wars, 1916–1926: Ten Years That Shook the World
- Russia in Flames: War, Revolution, Civil War, 1914–1921
- Russia in Revolution: An Empire in Crisis, 1890 to 1928
- Russia: Revolution and Civil War, 1917—1921
- The Russian Revolution: A New History

== Bibliography ==
- Darch, Colin (2020). Nestor Makhno and Rural Anarchism in Ukraine, 1917-1921. London: Pluto Press. pp. 99–114. ISBN 9781786805263. OCLC 1225942343.
- Kenez, Peter (2004). Red Advance, White Defeat. Civil War in South Russia 1919-1920. Washington DC: New Academia Publishing. ISBN 0974493457.
- Malet, Michael (1982). Nestor Makhno in the Russian Civil War. London: Palgrave Macmillan. pp. 59–68. ISBN 978-0-333-25969-6. OCLC 8514426.
- Mawdsley, Evan (2010). Wojna domowa w Rosji 1917–1920 (in Polish). Translated by Monika Popławska. Warsaw: Bellona. ISBN 978-83-11-11638-2. OCLC 750846354.
- Shefov, Nikolai (2006). "Северная Таврия". Битвы России (in Russian). Moscow: ACT. ISBN 5-17-010649-1. OCLC 858733219.
- Skirda, Alexandre (2004) [1982]. Nestor Makhno–Anarchy's Cossack: The Struggle for Free Soviets in the Ukraine 1917–1921. Translated by Sharkey, Paul. Oakland: AK Press. pp. 176–228. ISBN 978-1-902593-68-5. OCLC 60602979.
- Smele, J. D. (2015). The "Russian" Civil Wars 1916-1926. Ten Years That Shook the World. London: C. Hurst & Co. ISBN 9781849047210.
