= Orel–Kursk operation =

1919 offensive of the Russian Civil War

- Part of October counteroffensive of the Southern Front on the Southern Front of the Russian Civil War
| Date | 11 October – 18 November 1919 |
| Location | Orel, Kursk, and Tula Governorates, Russian Soviet Federative Socialist Republic |
| Result | Red victory |

Belligerents
| Russian SFSR | AFSR |

Commanders and leaders
| (Russian Soviet Federative Socialist Republic) Alexander Yegorov (Russian Soviet Federative Socialist Republic) Anatoly Gekker (Russian Soviet Federative Socialist Republic) Ieronim Uborevich | (Russian Empire) Vladimir May-Mayevsky (Russian Empire) Alexander Kutepov (Russian Empire) Yakov Yuzefovich |

Units involved
| Southern Front: 13th Army; 14th Army | Volunteer Army shock group: 1st Army Corps; 5th Cavalry Corps |

Strength
| 52,000 infantry; 7,000 cavalry; 278 guns; 1,119 machine guns | 19,000 infantry; 5,000 cavalry; 72 guns; 373 machine guns; 9 tanks; 14 armored trains |

The Orel–Kursk operation (known in Soviet historiography as the Orel–Kromy operation) was an offensive conducted by the Southern Front of the Russian Soviet Federative Socialist Republic's Red Army against the White Armed Forces of South Russia's Volunteer Army in Orel, Kursk and Tula Governorates of the Russian Soviet Federative Socialist Republic between 11 October and 18 November 1919. It took place on the Southern Front of the Russian Civil War and was part of the wider October counteroffensive of the Southern Front, a Red Army operation that aimed to stop Armed Forces of South Russia commander Anton Denikin's Moscow offensive.

After the failure of the Red Southern Front's August counteroffensive to stop the Moscow offensive, the Volunteer Army continued to push back the front's 13th and 14th Armies, capturing Kursk. The Southern Front was reinforced by troops transferred from other sectors, allowing it to regain numerical superiority over the Volunteer Army, and launched a counterattack to halt the offensive on 11 October, utilizing a shock group composed of newly arrived troops. Despite this, the Volunteer Army managed to deal a defeat to the 13th Army, capturing Orel, its nearest advance to Moscow. The Red shock group, however, struck into the flank of the Volunteer Army's advance, forcing the army to commit its lead forces to defending against the attack. In fierce fighting, the 14th Army recaptured Orel, after which the Red forces wore down the Volunteer Army in defensive battles. The Volunteer Army attempted to establish a new defensive line, but their rear was unhinged by Red cavalry raids. The offensive ended on 18 November with the recapture of Kursk. Although the Red Army did not manage to destroy the Volunteer Army, the Southern Front counteroffensive marked a turning point in the war, as it had permanently regained the strategic initiative.

== Background ==
After repulsing the Red Army Southern Front's August counteroffensive towards Kharkov, Lieutenant General Vladimir May-Mayevsky's Volunteer Army, part of Anton Denikin's Armed Forces of South Russia, resumed its advance on Moscow in mid-September 1919. The army's main attack was conducted by the 1st Army Corps towards Kursk, Orel, and Tula. On 20 September, the corps captured Kursk. The Southern Front's 13th and 14th Armies retreated north in the face of attacks by numerically superior White troops. As a result, the Central Committee ordered the Main Command of the Red Army to send reinforcements to the Southern Front and begin the transfer of the Latvian Rifle Division, Estonian and Separate Rifle Brigades, and the Separate Cavalry Brigade of Red Cossacks from the Western Front. These units were planned to be used to create a front shock group in the area of Navlya and Dmitrovsk. As a result of these measures, by 5 October, the Southern Front had regained numerical superiority in the Orel direction.

== Prelude ==
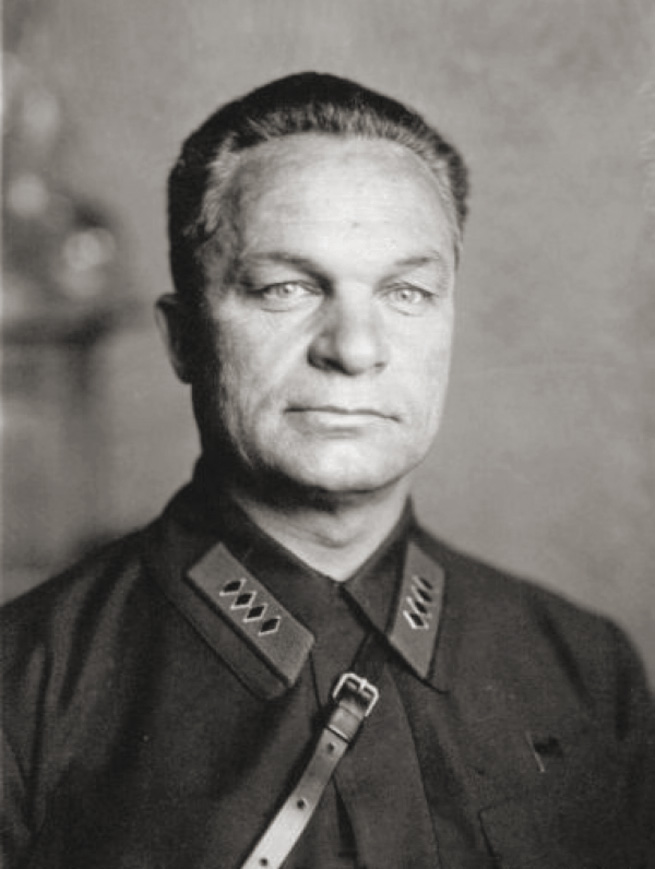
Alexander Yegorov commanded the Red Southern Front during the operation

By 10 October, the Volunteer Army shock group had reached the line of Khutor Mikhailovsky-Sevsk-Dmitrovsk-Yeropkino-Livny-Borki, and continued their advance north towards Moscow, seeking a breakthrough at Orel. The shock group included Lieutenant General Alexander Kutepov's 1st Army and Lieutenant General Yakov Yuzefovich's 5th Cavalry Corps. The group numbered approximately 19,000 infantry, over 5,000 cavalry, 72 guns, 373 machine guns, nine tanks, and fourteen armored trains. The 1st Army Corps included the Kornilov and Drozdovsky Infantry Divisions, and the Consolidated Infantry Division with the Markov and Alekseyev Brigades.

They were opposed by the Red Southern Front, whose commander, Vladimir Yegoryev, was replaced by Alexander Yegorov on 11 October. The troops of the front in the Orel sector numbered over 52,000 infantry, more than 7,000 cavalry, 278 guns, and 1,119 machine guns, giving them a 3:1 numerical superiority over the Whites.

=== Soviet planning ===
In these conditions, the Soviet Main Command decided to begin the counterattack without waiting for the arrival of the Estonian Rifle Brigade. On 7 October, the Commander-in-Chief of the Armed Forces of the Republic, Sergey Kamenev, ordered the Southern Front command to draw up plans for the operation, and on 9 October subordinated to it the shock group, which concentrated in the Karachev area.

In the Orel–Kursk operation, the troops of the right wing and center of the front were to advance in the general direction of Kursk, defeat the 1st Army Corps, and capture the line of Sevsk, Fatezh, and Livny. After completing the destruction of the corps, they were to retake Kursk and advance to the line of the Seym River and the Kursk-Kastornoye railroad.

The missions of the armies were given to a depth of between 80 and 150 kilometers, and were divided into immediate and following. The main role was given to Antons Martusevičs' shock group, consisting of the Latvian Rifle Division, and the Separate Rifle and Separate Cavalry Brigades, which numbered 10,000 bayonets and sabers. It was formed from newly arrived reinforcements. It was to launch its attack from the line of Turishchevo and Molodovoye, into the flank of the Volunteer Army's advance to Orel. With the beginning of the offensive, the group was operationally subordinated to Anatoly Gekker's 13th Army.

The 13th Army's main forces (the 9th, 55th, and Consolidated Rifle Divisions) were to advance along the Orel-Kursk railroad and destroy the Volunteer Army's Kornilov Division in conjunction with the shock group, while its left flank units (the 3rd and 42nd Rifle Divisions and the 13th Cavalry Brigade) were tasked with attacking the Consolidated Division at Livny. The right flank units (the 46th Rifle Division and a brigade of the 41st Rifle Division) of Ieronim Uborevich's 14th Army, the front's right wing, were to capture Khutor Mikhailovsky, while the army's main forces (the 7th, 41st, and 57th Rifle Divisions, and the 11th and 14th Cavalry Brigades) were to defeat the Drozdovsky Division, then advance on Dmitriyev on the right of the shock group.

== Offensive ==
On 11 October, the troops of the Red shock group and the 14th Army began the offensive. Overcoming the resistance of the Drozdovsky Division, Robert Eideman's 41st Rifle Division captured Khutor Mikhailovsky, while the shock group slowly advanced to Kromy. Meanwhile, the Volunteer Army shock group defeated the main forces of the 13th Army (9th, 55th, and Consolidated Rifle Divisions) and took Kromy on 10 October, before taking Orel on 13 October, their northernmost advance. At a distance of 205 miles (330 km), this was the closest the White Russian forces got to Moscow in the Russian Civil War. This cut the communications between the 13th Army headquarters and the Red shock group, resulting in the transfer of the latter to the 14th Army, which had retreated from Sevsk and Dmitrovsk to the line of the Nerussa. The Estonian Rifle Division, formed from the arriving Estonian Rifle Brigade and the remnants of the Consolidated Rifle Division, also joined the army.

As a result of the White advance, the front ordered the shock group to use its main forces to advance on Yeropkino, with its left flank troops diverted to Orel, in the rear of the Kornilov division. The Estonian Rifle Division was to advance on Orel from the west and recapture the city in conjunction with the shock group's left flank units and the 9th Rifle Division, while the 14th Army's right flank units covered the right flank of the shock group in its attack to the east and southeast. The 13th Army's 9th Rifle Division (reinforced by the remnants of the 55th Division) and newly arrived 2nd Separate Rifle Brigade were to attack Orel from the north, while the 3rd and 42nd Divisions and the 13th Cavalry Brigade captured Livny.

Orel-Kursk operation

The shock group broke the White resistance on 14 October, and took Kromy on the night of 15 October, while the left flank threatened the rear of the Kornilov Division. This forced the commitment of the Drozdovsky and Kornilov Divisions to destroying the shock group, forcing the stoppage of the White advance on Tula. The shock group, deep into White lines, was attacked from both flanks and forced onto the defensive. Fierce battles, which often took on the character of meeting engagements, were conducted for the next several days with varying degrees of success for both sides. On 17 October, Yegorov committed the 14th Army reserve, Jakob Palvadre's Estonian Rifle Division. In three days of fierce fighting, the division, in conjunction with elements of the shock group, Pyotr Solodukhin's 9th Rifle Division, and the rest of the main forces of the 13th and 14th Armies, broke the stubborn White resistance and advanced on Orel from the southwest, west, and southeast. On the night of 20 October, the White troops hastily left the city, which was captured by the Estonian and 9th Rifle Divisions and the 3rd Latvian Rifle Brigade.

On 21 October, strongly supported by artillery and armored trains, the Volunteer Army launched a counterattack on the front between Sevsk and Yelets. The army captured Kromy on 24 October and Sevsk on 29 October. Having exhausted the Whites in defensive battles, the Red Army recaptured Kromy and Dmitrovsk on 27 October, pushing them back from Orel and Yelets, before capturing Livny on 3 November. Having completely exhausted their offensive capability, the 1st Army Corps began to retreat to the south, and in order to prevent it from forming a defensive line at Sevsk, Dmitrovsk, Yeropkino, and Yelets, Yegorov ordered Uborevich to commit Vitaly Primakov's 8th Cavalry Division, formed during the operation from the 11th, 14th, and Red Cossack Cavalry Brigades and numbering 1,700 cavalry, six guns, and 32 machine guns on tachankas. Primakov's division entered the breakthrough to the southeast of Dmitrovsk on 3 November and advanced into the White rear. For three days, the cavalrymen fought 120 kilometers in the White rear, inflicting great damage on the retreating Whites. They took Ponyri on 4 November and Fatezh on 5 November. The 14th Army captured Sevsk on 6 November, and Dmitriev on 13 November. On 9 November, the 13th Army cut the Kursk-Kastornoye railway, splitting the Volunteer Army in two between its troops around Kursk and around Kastornoye. Janis Pauka's 42nd Rifle Division and the 13th Cavalry Brigade assisted Semyon Budyonny's Cavalry Corps in the rout of the White troops around Kastornoye on 15 November.

Kursk was captured by the Estonian and 9th Rifle Divisions on 18 November. A key role in defeating the White troops around Kursk was played by a raid by Primakov's division between 14 and 18 November. The division captured the major road junction of Lgov on 15 November, and during the raid killed 500 and captured 1,700 White soldiers and officers, as well as capturing eleven guns, 50 machine guns, five armored trains, up to 200 supply wagons and other trophies. On 18 November troops of the 13th and 14th Armies reached the line of Rylsk, Lgov, Kursk, Tim, and Kastornoye, finishing the operation.

== Aftermath ==
The Orel–Kursk operation halted Denikin's advance on Moscow and defeated the main White shock group, opening the way for the Red advance on Kharkov and the Donbas. Along with the simultaneous Voronezh–Kastornoye operation, it marked a turning point in the fight against the Armed Forces of South Russia, creating favorable conditions for the advance of the Southern and Southeastern Fronts in 1919 and 1920. The loss of Kursk and Kastornoye broke White morale, preventing them from resisting the Red advance in pitched battle, and precipitated a White retreat that lasted until they reached the North Caucasus. The strategic initiative on the front was gained by the Red Army, but it did not manage to destroy the Volunteer Army's main forces, due to weak communications between the armies, the inability to build up sufficient reserves during the offensive, and command shortcomings.

The operation was characterized by being tensely fought for most of the operation, the high number of meeting engagements, large troop maneuvers, a decisive massing of troops in key sectors, the skillful use of cavalry for raids in the White rear, and low operational density – on average, one division held between 25 and 70 kilometers, with between .8 and .2 guns per kilometer of front. The combat actions of the Southern Front were conducted to a depth of 350 kilometers.

== See also ==
- Bibliography of the Russian Revolution and Civil War
- Outline of the Russian Revolution and Civil War
- Index of articles related to the Russian Revolution and Civil War
- The "Russian" Civil Wars, 1916–1926: Ten Years That Shook the World
- Russia in Flames: War, Revolution, Civil War, 1914–1921
- Russia in Revolution: An Empire in Crisis, 1890 to 1928
- Russia: Revolution and Civil War, 1917—1921
- The Russian Revolution: A New History
