= Battle of Obytichnyi Spit =

- Part of the Southern Front of the Russian Civil War
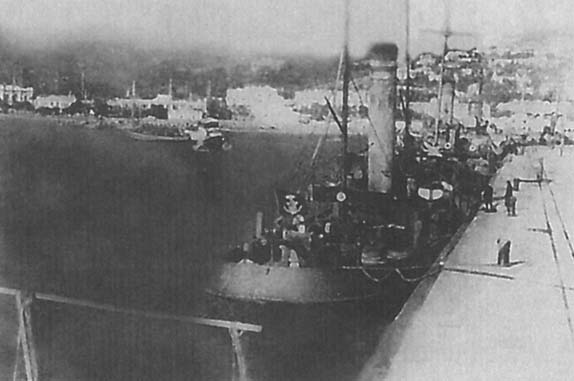
- Gunboat Budyonny
Date	15 September 1920
Location	Obytichnyi Spit, Azov Sea.
Result	Both sides claim victory

Belligerents
Russian Navy	Russian SFSR

Strength
2 gunboats, 2 armed icebreakers, 1 patrol boat, 1 minesweeper.	4 gunboats, 3 patrol boats

Casualties and losses
1 gunboat sunk, 1 gunboat damaged 2 killed	1 gunboat damaged

The Battle of Obytichnyi Spit was a naval battle fought in the Sea of Azov during the Russian Civil War.

== Prior events ==
On 13 September 1920 the White Fleet ships departed to shell Berdiansk the following day, but found no enemy vessels and then moved to protect a convoy of ships carrying grain. The detachment included two gunboats (Ural and Salgyr) two armed icebreaker (Gaydamak and Djigit), one patrol boat, one unarmed minesweeper and received the support from torpedo boat Zorkyi (carrying no torpedo tubes).

After receiving news of the naval bombardment against Berdiansk, the Reds dispatched from Mariupol the following ships: gunboats Budyonny, Krasnaya Zvezda, Svoboda and Znamya Sotsializma, supported by three patrol boats.

The two forces were equal in number of ships with Whites having an advantage in artillery fire and speed (The Reds gunboats could not sail more than 5 knots).

== Battle ==
At dawn of 15 September, the two flotilla engaged: Reds fired first, opening fire from 60 cables of distance. The shelling brought no damage and Reds suffered difficulties. During the first phase of battle, only Ural and Salgyr opened fire against the Reds.

The ships maneuvered and exchanged sporadic fire, until around midday the battle reached a peak. With 40 cables of distance, White gunboat Gaydamak scored one hit on the Red gunboat Znamya Sotsializma: the boiler's power pipes suffered damage and ship lost course being wrapped in its own steam. Krasnaya Zvezda took in tow the damaged unit and returned fire scoring two hits on gunboat Salgyr on the waterline causing her quick sinking: Salgyr was quickly lost with 2 crewmembers. Gunboat Ural took damage while saving the sailors of Salgyr.

The battle lasted until the Whites consumed their ammunition. Reds gunboats kept on firing against the retreating White units until 13:30. Receiving news about the battle, Whites dispatched destroyer Bespokoynny and gunboat Strazh as reinforcement, but they did not reached the battle in time and Bespokoynny suffered damage after blowing up a mine (according another version the ship just delayed).

== Results ==
The White flotilla lost one ship (Salgyr) while a second one was damaged (Ural) and was forced to retreat, pursued by the enemy. Nevertheless, both sides claimed victory.

According to the Whites although the fight was indecisive, they claimed an "unquestionable" victory having protected transports loaded with grain. In addition, they claimed that Reds ships did not operated again in the Sea of Azov.

Soviets historiography claimed the opposite, stating that White ships no longer dared to enter the Sea of Azov and gave Reds naval superiority with ships providing direct support from the sea during the offensive begun on 12 September.

== Trivia ==
The battle was the last one when a battle squadron sailed under the St. Andrew's flag before the fall of the Soviet Union.

== See also ==
- Bibliography of the Russian Revolution and Civil War
- Outline of the Russian Revolution and Civil War
- Index of articles related to the Russian Revolution and Civil War
- The "Russian" Civil Wars, 1916–1926: Ten Years That Shook the World
- Russia in Flames: War, Revolution, Civil War, 1914–1921
- Russia in Revolution: An Empire in Crisis, 1890 to 1928
- Russia: Revolution and Civil War, 1917—1921
- The Russian Revolution: A New History
