= Voronezh–Kastornoye operation (1919) =

- Part of Southern Front of the Russian Civil War
- Front in Summer 1919
Date	13 October – 16 November 1919
Location	Voronezh Governorate, Russia
Result	Decisive Red victory: Soviet troops advanced up to 250 kilometers

Belligerents
Russian SFSR; Commune of the Working People of Estonia	Armed Forces of South Russia

Commanders and leaders
(Russian Soviet Federative Socialist Republic) Alexander Yegorov; (Russian Soviet Federative Socialist Republic) Semyon Budyonny; (Russian Soviet Federative Socialist Republic) Grigori Sokolnikov; (Russian Soviet Federative Socialist Republic) Ieronim Uborevich	(Russian Empire) Anton Denikin; (Russian Empire) Konstantin Mamontov; (Russian Empire) Andrei Shkuro

Units involved
Southern Front: 1st Cavalry Corps; 8th Army; 13th Army; 1st Estonian Red Division	Volunteer Army shock group: 4th Don Corps; 3rd Kuban Corps

Strength
12,000 infantry; 8,400 cavalry; 94 guns; 351 machine guns	5,300 infantry; 10,200 cavalry; 60 guns; 337 machine guns; 3 tanks; 6 armored trains

The Voronezh-Kastornoye operation was an offensive operation by the Red Army during the Russian Civil War in October and November 1919, which was successfully carried out by parts of the 8th and 13th Army, which formed the left wing of the Southern Front.

== Plans ==
After the failure of the White Advance on Moscow in August 1919, the Red Army had launched a successful counteroffensive. In October 1919, the command of the Southern Front, led by Alexander Yegorov, had designed a plan to

- strike at the flank of the Cossack Shock Group of General Denikin,
- destroy the main cavalry units of the Don and Volunteer Armies,
- capture the city of Voronezh,
- achieve favorable conditions for the dismemberment of Denikin's front and the launch of a subsequent offensive to the rear of the White troops in the direction of the cities of Oryol and Kursk.

The main attack was to be inflicted by the 1st Cavalry Corps of Semyon Budyonny in the direction of Voronezh and Kastornoye, in order to crush the White 4th Don Corps and the 3rd Kuban Corps, and create favorable conditions for the 8th Army to reach the Don River.

== The course of the operation ==
On October 13, units of Budyonny's Cavalry Corps entered into battle with Mamontov’s Cavalry Corps near the village of Moskovskoye. The battle raged until October 19, and the village changed hands several times. On October 19, the cavalry corps of Andrei Shkuro and Mamantov struck at the junction of the Red 4th and 6th Cavalry Divisions in the direction of the village of Khrenovoe. Budyonny repulsed the attack and pushed the White troops back to the eastern outskirts of Voronezh.

On October 23, the 1st Cavalry Corps, in cooperation with the 12th and 15th Rifle Divisions of the 8th Army, launched an offensive towards Voronezh and, after fierce battles, seized the city on October 24. On October 26, the 33rd Rifle Division of the 8th Army occupied the city of Liski on the Don, thereby pushing the 3rd Don Corps over the river Don. On October 29, the 42nd Rifle Division of the 13th Army captured Dolgorukovo. On October 31, the corps of Budyonny was reinforced by the reserve 11th Cavalry Division. On November 2, Mamantov's corps counterattacked in the area of Klevna-Shumeyka, but retreated after suffering heavy losses. On November 3, the 42nd Rifle Division occupied Livny and began to advance towards Kastornoye. Kastornoye station was reached on November 5 by the Cavalry Corps of Budyonny and troops of the 8th and 13th armies.

In a new counterattack, troops of the White Army retook Liski, Talovaya, Novokhopyorsk and Bobrov. This created a threat that the Whites would reoccupy Voronezh. From 5 to 15 November, the 42nd Rifle and 11th Cavalry Divisions from the North, the 12th Rifle and 6th Cavalry Divisions from the South and the 4th Cavalry Division from the East, under cover of a serious snowstorm, launched a new attack and seized Kastornoye. By the end of November 16, the area was clear of Whites troops. On November 19, the Cavalry Corps of Budyonny was expanded into the 1st Cavalry Army.

== Consequences ==
In the course of the operation, Soviet troops advanced up to 250 kilometers, defeated the main forces of the White cavalry and, threatening the flank and rear of the Volunteer Army, contributed to their defeat in the Orel–Kursk operation.

The Voronezh–Kastornoye operation is the first battle during the Russian Civil War with massive use of large cavalry formations.

== See also ==
- Orel–Kursk operation

== See also ==
- Bibliography of the Russian Revolution and Civil War
- Outline of the Russian Revolution and Civil War
- Index of articles related to the Russian Revolution and Civil War
- The "Russian" Civil Wars, 1916–1926: Ten Years That Shook the World
- Russia in Flames: War, Revolution, Civil War, 1914–1921
- Russia in Revolution: An Empire in Crisis, 1890 to 1928
- Russia: Revolution and Civil War, 1917—1921
- The Russian Revolution: A New History

== Literature ==
- Nikolai Nikolaevich Azovtsev. Encyclopedia "Civil War and Intervention in the USSR" / S.S. Khromov .. - 1983. - P. 114–115. - 702 s.
