= 46th Rifle Division (1919 formation) =

46th Yekaterinoslav Rifle Division
- Active: June 1919 – June 1921
- Country: Russian Soviet Federated Socialist Republic
- Branch: Red Army
- Type: Infantry
- Engagements: Russian Civil War

The 46th Yekaterinoslav Rifle Division (Russian: 46-я Екатеринославская стрелковая дивизия) was an infantry division of the Red Army during the Russian Civil War.

== History ==
The 46th Rifle Division was formed by an order of the 12th Army of 16 June 1919 from units of the army's 2nd Ukrainian Soviet Division and two separate rifle brigades. The division fought on the Southern Front for the duration of the Russian Civil War, seeing its first action against the White Armed Forces of South Russia in the region of Poltava, Baturyn, and Putyvl from June to August. In August 1919 it was shifted to the 14th Army, taking part in the capture of Sumy in September. The 46th took part in the offensives of the Southern Front from late 1919 to early 1920. It defended the line of the Desna in the region of Sosnitsa and Razlety and took Sevsk, Dmitrovsk, Vorozhba and Lgov during the Orel–Kursk operation between 11 October and 18 November. The Red advance continued in the Kharkiv Operation of 24 November to 12 December, during which the 46th attacked in the region of Sudzha and Grayvoron to take Kharkiv. In January 1920 it was shifted to the 13th Army, advancing on the axis of Lozova, Chaplina, Nogaysk, Berdiansk, and Melitopol that month. The Soviet advance came to a halt on the Dnieper, and the division went on the defensive in the region of Kakhovka and Nikopol on the left bank of the Dnieper.

From January to April the division fought in battles against the Army of Wrangel in the region of the Isthmus of Perekop and the Chonhar Peninsula. The division took part in the elimination of a White landing in the region of Melitopol between April and June. In the face of Wrangel's counterattack, the division conducted a fighting retreat to the line of Bolshoy Tokmak, the Molochna river, and Orikhiv during July and August. The division took part in the counterattack that took Sinelnikovo in September and the capture of the Nikopol bridgehead on the left bank of the Dnieper in October. The division was placed under the operational control of the 2nd Cavalry Army in October. In the Perekop–Chongar operation from 7 to 17 November, the division reached the Chonhar Isthmus, capturing Dzhankoi. After the end of the operation, the division was transferred to the 4th Army, guarding the Crimean coast in the sector from Alushta to Yevpatoria while suppressing resistance in Crimea between December 1920 and April 1921.

The division received the Yekaterinoslav honorific on 13 December 1920. As the army demobilized for peacetime, the division was assigned to the Kharkov Military District in April 1921. In accordance with an order of the Kharkov Military District of 26 April 1921 the division was reduced to the 46th Yekaterinoslav Separate Rifle Brigade, and by an order of the district on 17 June 1921 redesignated the 8th Separate Rifle Brigade and assigned to the 3rd Kazan Rifle Division.

== Commanders ==
The following served as commanders (chiefs) of the division:

- Aleksandr Lengovsky (24 June–16 November 1919)
- Roberts Eidemanis (16 November 1919–2 April 1920)
- Yury Sablin (2 April–14 June 1920)
- Ivan Fedko (14 June–14 December 1920)
- Vladislav Grushetsky (14 December 1920–26 April 1921)

The following served as commissars of the division, holding equal command authority to the division chief:

- Isaak Mints (24 June–July 1919)
- Lev Mekhlis (July 1919–17 April 1920, 13 September–12 December 1920)
- Bersenev (Bersen) (18 April–8 August 1920)
- Solovyov (8 August–13 September 1920)
- G. T. Taran (18 December 1920–26 April 1921)
