= 3rd Rifle Division (Soviet Union) =

- 3-я стрелковая Краснознамённая дивизия имени Президиума Верховного Совета Крымской АССР
- Active: 1918–1946
- Country: Soviet Union
- Branch: Red Army
- Type: Infantry
- Size: Division
- Part of: 2nd Red Banner Army
- Engagements: Russian Civil War; October Southern Front counteroffensive; Orel–Kursk operation; Donbas operation; Northern Taurida Operation; World War II; Invasion of Manchuria
- Decorations: Order of the Red Banner (1945)
- Battle honours: named after the Praesidium of the Supreme Council of the Crimean Autonomous Soviet Socialist Republic

Commanders
- Notable commanders: Marcian Germanovich (1921–1922); Maksim Antoniuk (1925–1930)

The 3rd Rifle Division was an infantry division of the Soviet Army. It was formed in 1921 in Crimea. The division relocated to Svobodny in the Far East during 1939 and moved to Blagoveshchensk soon after. The division fought in the Soviet invasion of Manchuria and was disbanded in 1946.

== History ==
The division began forming during the Russian Civil War as the 2nd Moscow Infantry Division by an order of the Supreme Military Council on 31 May 1918, but was disbanded by an order of the Moscow District Military Commissariat on 24 September of that year. Its headquarters and units were used to form the 3rd Rifle Division, which also included elements of the disbanded Kaluga Infantry Division. The division remained part of the Moscow Military District from its formation until February 1919, when it transferred to the reserve of the Commander-in-Chief and then that of the Southern Front until June.

The 3rd joined the 13th Army of the front in July and fought in the August counteroffensive of the Southern Front between 14 August and 12 September, in the attack on Belgorod and a fighting retreat in the face of the advance of the Armed Forces of South Russia to the line of the Seym from the region of Stary Oskol, Kursk, and Shchigry. The division then went on the offensive in the Orel–Kursk operation between 11 October and 18 November, participating in the capture of Livny, Shchigry, and Tim. The victorious Soviet advance continued with the Kharkov Operation between 24 November and 12 December, during which the division captured Volchansk and advanced to Kupyansk. During the Donbas operation between 18 and 31 December it ensured the offensive of the main forces, and then participated in the recapture of the Donbass from December to January 1920.

The division guarded the Azov coast in the area of Berdyansk and Rostov during January and February 1920, then fought in the battles against the Army of Wrangel in Northern Taurida in the Perekop direction, in the area of Aleksandrovsk-Pologi railway between April and June. After defending the Kakhovka Bridgehead in August against White attack, the 3rd fought in the counteroffensive in Northern Taurida between 28 October and 3 November, in which it was involved in the battles in the Nikopol and Belozerka region. The division was operationally subordinated to the 2nd Cavalry Army between 16 and 30 October 1920, and then transferred to the 4th Army of the front. By an order of the 4th Army of the Southern Front on 5 November 1920, the division was disbanded, with its headquarters and units used to bring the 23rd Rifle Division up to strength. This proved brief, as on 14 November the 23rd Rifle Division was redesignated as the 3rd Rifle Division. The division was renamed the 3rd Kazan Rifle Division on 13 December. The division fought in the elimination of Makhnovist forces and remnants of the Whites and Greens in the region of Staryi Krym, Feodosia, and Sevastopol between December and April 1921.

In April 1921 the army was disbanded and the division became part of the Kharkov Military District. An order of the Kharkov Military District on 26 April 1921 reorganized the division into the 3rd Kazan Separate Rifle Brigade, but on 5 June the 3rd and 46th Separate Rifle Brigades were combined to reform the 3rd Kazan Rifle Division. The division became part of the Ukrainian Military District and on 25 May 1925 was renamed the 3rd Crimean Rifle Division named for the TsIK of the Crimean ASSR.

=== Second World War ===
In November 1939 the division was relocated to the Far Eastern Front. On 16 July 1940 its designation was changed to the 3rd Rifle Division named for the Presidium of the Supreme Soviet of the Crimean ASSR. At the beginning of World War II it was located in Blagoveshchensk, assigned to the 2nd Red Banner Army of the Far Eastern Front. The division remained on the Far Eastern Front from 1941 to 1945 and was not redeployed to fight the Germans.

At the very end of the Second World War it was involved in the Sungari Army Group Operation with 2nd Red Banner Army. It forced the Amur and Ussuri rivers, and captured several cities in China from the Japanese Kwantung Army. Immediately post war the division was part of the 1st Red Banner Army, Transbaikal-Amur Military District, 136th Rifle Corps, alongside the 12th, and 396th Rifle Divisions and the 101st Fortified Region/MGAD. For its actions in Manchuria, the division was awarded the Order of the Red Banner on 14 September.

It was disbanded on 30 August 1946 after being transferred to the 26th Rifle Corps. The Division's full name just before being disbanded was the 3rd Rifle Red Banner Division named for the Presidium of the Supreme Council of the Crimean ASSR.

== Literature ==
- Affairs Directorate of the Ministry of Defense of the Soviet Union (1967). Сборник приказов РВСР, РВС СССР, НКО и Указов Президиума Верховного Совета СССР о награждении орденами СССР частей, соединениий и учреждений ВС СССР. Часть II. 1945 - 1966 гг [Collection of orders of the RVSR, RVS USSR and NKO on awarding orders to units, formations and establishments of the Armed Forces of the USSR. Part II. 1945–1966] (PDF) (in Russian). Moscow. Archived from the original (PDF) on 3 October 2020.
- Dvoinykh, L.V.; Karyaeva, T.F.; Stegantsev, M.V., eds. (1993). Центральный государственный архив Советской армии: Путеводитель [A Guide to the Central State Archive of the Soviet Army] (in Russian). Vol. 2. Minneapolis: Eastview Publications. ISBN 1879944030.
- Feskov, V.I.; Golikov, V.I.; Kalashnikov, K.A.; Slugin, S.A. (2013). Вооруженные силы СССР после Второй Мировой войны: от Красной Армии к Советской [The Armed Forces of the USSR after World War II: From the Red Army to the Soviet: Part 1 Land Forces] (in Russian). Tomsk: Scientific and Technical Literature Publishing. ISBN 9785895035306.
