= 2nd Cavalry Army =

- 2-я Конная армия
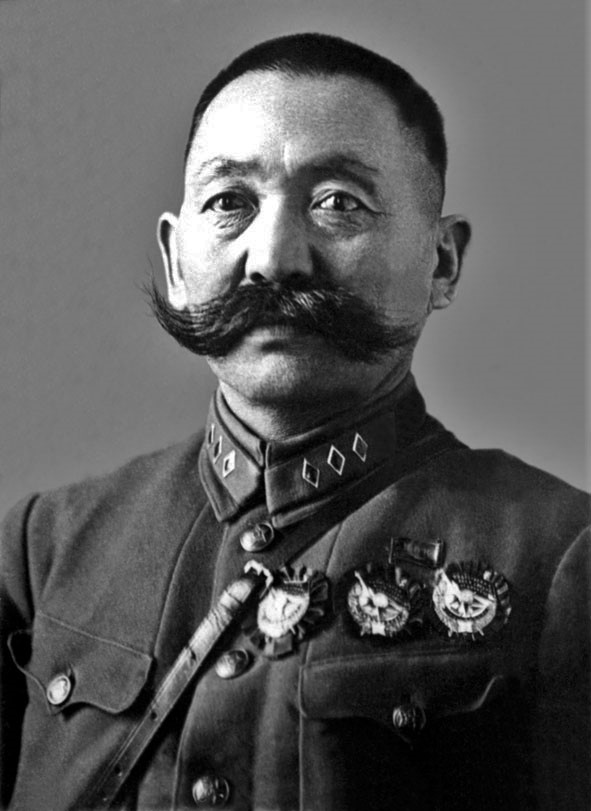
- Oka Ivanovich Gorodovikov (1879–1960) Soviet general
- Active: 16 July 1920
- Disbanded: 6 December 1920
- Country: Russia
- Branch: Red Army
- Type: Cavalry Army
- Engagements: Russian Civil War

The 2nd Cavalry Army (Russian: 2-я Конная армия) was a cavalry army of the Red Army during the Russian Civil War.

== History ==
It was created by an order of the Revolutionary Military Council of the Southwestern Front on 16 July 1920 from the remnants of the 1st Cavalry Corps of Dmitry Zhloba, under the command of Oka Gorodovikov.

The army, part of the Southwestern Front, included the 2nd, 16th, 20th, and 21st Cavalry Divisions and fielded about 5,500 men upon formation. In conjunction with the 13th Army, the 2nd Cavalry Army pushed the White Russian Army of General Pyotr Wrangel out of Alexandrovsk in July. It then fought in the Northern Taurida Operation during August, attacking the Russian Army bridgehead on the right bank of the Dnieper at Kakhovka. Filipp Mironov replaced Gorodovikov on 6 September. On the same day, the 20th Cavalry Division was disbanded and its troops used to reinforce the 2nd and 9th Cavalry Divisions. It was transferred to the reformed Southern Front on 21 September. The 3rd and 46th Rifle Divisions were attached to the army in October. During the Perekop–Chongar operation in November, the army attacked across the Isthmus of Perekop alongside the 6th Army, defeating the Russian Army and entering Simferopol on 13 November after the evacuation of the latter.

On 6 December 1920 the army was reorganised as the 2nd Cavalry Corps in accordance with an order of 18 November.

== Commanders ==
- Oka Ivanovich Gorodovikov (16 July - 6 September 1920)
- Filipp Mironov (6 September - 6 December 1920)
