= Roberts Eidemanis =

Latvian Soviet general (1895–1937)

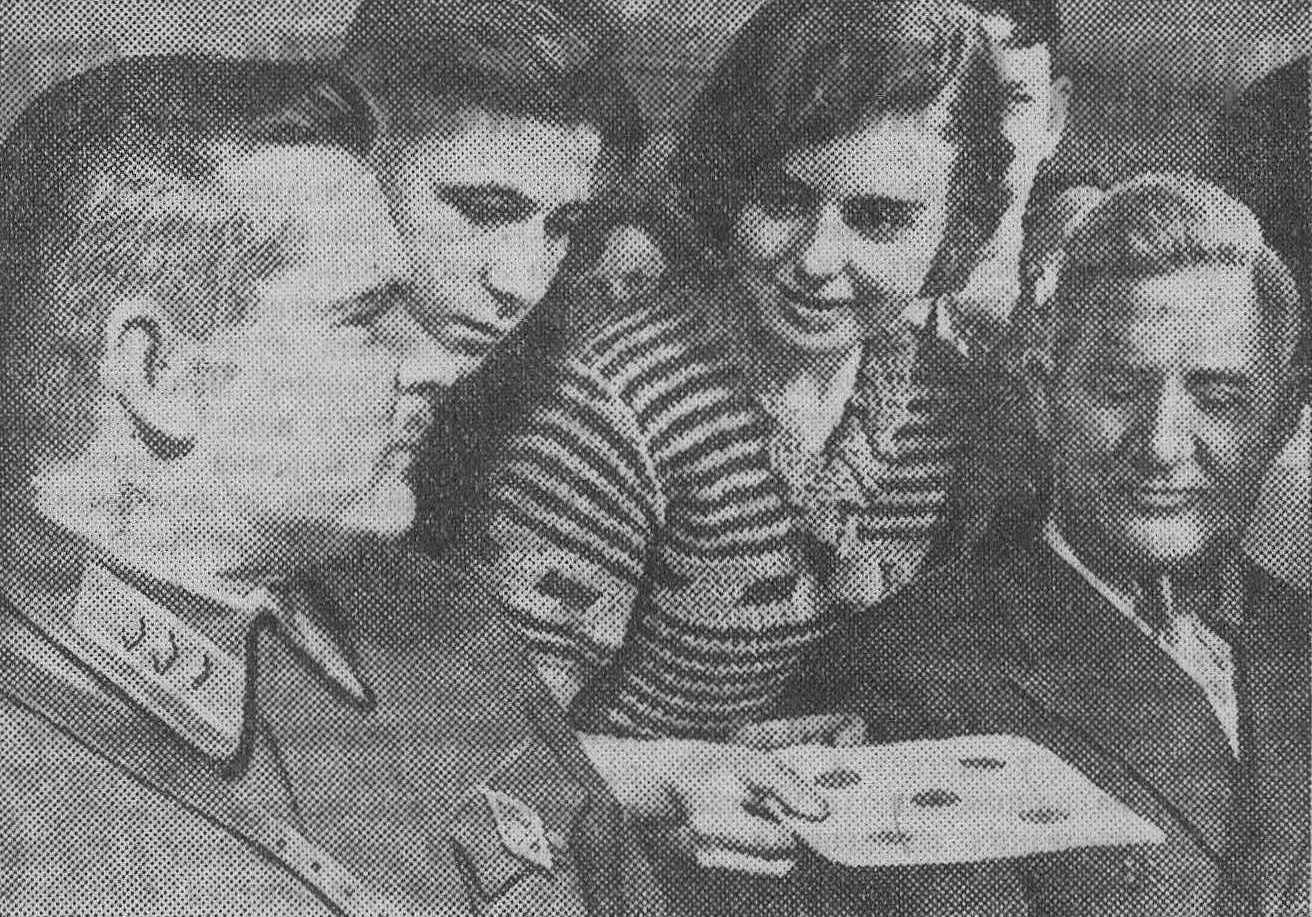
- Robert Eideman and the American military attaché Philip R. Faymonville
- Born: May 9, 1895; Lejasciems, Gulbene Municipality, Russian Empire (now Latvia)
- Died: June 12, 1937 (aged 42); Moscow, Russian SFSR, Soviet Union
- Military career
- Allegiance: Russian Empire; Soviet Union
- Service years: 1916–1917 (Russian Empire); 1917–1937 (Soviet Union)
- Rank: Komkor
- Conflicts: World War I Russian Civil War

Roberts Eidemanis (Russian: Ро́берт Петро́вич Эйдема́н, Robert Petrovich Eideman; May 9, 1895 – June 12, 1937) was a Latvian Soviet Komkor and later a writer and poet. Executed during the Latvian Operation of the Great Purge, he was rehabilitated during the Khrushchev Thaw.

== Early years ==
He was born May 9, 1895, in Lejasciems, Gulbene Municipality of Latvia as the son of a Latvian father and an Estonian mother. He studied at Valkas real school. In 1913 he published the story "Mountain Family".

After graduating from school in the fall of 1914, Eidemanis entered the Petrograd Forestry Institute. During this time, he began his activities in social revolutionary socialist groups.

== Revolutionary activities ==
During the First World War, in 1916, Eidemanis was drafted into the army of the Russian Empire and sent to the Kiev military school, after which he was appointed a junior officer of the Siberian Rifle Regiment. After the February Revolution, in March 1917, Eidemanis became a member of the Bolshevik Party. He was one of the organizers of the Bolshevik coup in Siberia, after which he worked in the Council of Workers' Soldiers' Deputies of Kansk. At the first Siberian Congress of Soviets, he was elected a member of the Siberian Central Executive Committee and its deputy chairman. He was later a member of the Constituent Assembly of 1918.

== Red Army career ==
In December 1917, he participated in the suppression of the junker uprising in Irkutsk. In May 1918, he led battles against the Czechoslovak corps in the Omsk region, and later led several Siberian partisan units. At the beginning of 1919, Eidemanis commanded the 16th Rifle Division on the Don Front in the battles against General Krasnov, then as the commander of the 41st, later the 46th Rifle Division, he fought against Anton Denikin's troops. In 1920, Eidemanis commanded the 13th Army in the battles against Pyotr Wrangel's army. The army under his command played a decisive role in the defense of the key to Crimea, the Kakhovka bridgeheads. In 1921, Eidemanis was appointed deputy commander of the Ukrainian and Crimean war zone. There, together with Mikhail Frunze, he led the fight against Nestor Makhno's units in Ukraine.

After the end of the civil war in 1924, he was appointed commander of the Siberian Military District, and from 1925 to 1932, Eidemanis worked as the head and commissar of the Frunze Military Academy. In 1932, Eidemanis became a member of the Revolutionary Military Council and the chairman of the Central Council of the Osoaviakhim paramilitary organization.

== Literary activities ==
Beginning in 1925, he published several prose works and was active in the Latvian culture and education society "Prometeys". He was the chairman of the Central Bureau of Latvian Writers and in 1934 he was admitted to the Union of Soviet Writers.

== Arrest, execution and rehabilitation ==
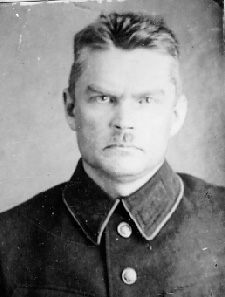
Eideman after his arrest by the NKVD

Eidemanis was arrested on May 22, 1937, during the Moscow Party Conference. Under torture, he admitted his participation in a military-fascist conspiracy and the Latvian underground organization. He was one of the defendants in the Case of Trotskyist Anti-Soviet Military Organization alongside Marshal Mikhail Tukhachevsky.

On June 11, at a special session of the Supreme Court of the USSR, he was sentenced to death. He was shot on June 12 in Moscow, together with Tukhachevsky, Iona Yakir, Ieronim Uborevich and other military figures. His body was secretly cremated in Moscow's Don Cemetery and buried in a mass grave.

After the death of Joseph Stalin, Eidemanis was rehabilitated in 1957.

== Awards ==
- Order of the Red Banner (1920, 1922)
- Order of the Red Star

== Prose ==
- Kalnaj-dsimt (The Mountain Family) 1913
- An Unstoppable March (1925)
- Encircled (1925)
- The Stone Rebellion (1929)
- Stories of the Town (1926)
- Duty (1926)
- Let's Go on the Attack (1930)
- Reunion (1935)
- Before the Storm (1935)

== Military technical monographs ==
- The fight against Kulak Rebellion and Banditry. Kharkov, 1921 (Cīņa ar kulaku sacelšanos un bandītismu)
- Очаги атаманщины и бандитизма (Hotbeds of Atamanism and Banditry), 2nd edition, Kharkov, 1921 (in Russian)
- The Army in 1917. M.-L., Gos. Ed. 1927. 107 pages (Armija 1917 gadā) co-author Melikov
- The Civil War in Ukraine. Kharkov. 1928 (Pilsoņu karš Ukrainā), co-author Nikolai Kakurin
