= Southern Front of the Russian Civil War =

Military theater of the Russian Civil War

Southern Front
- Part of the Russian Civil War, the Russo-Caucasian conflict, and the Eastern Front of the Turkish War of Independence
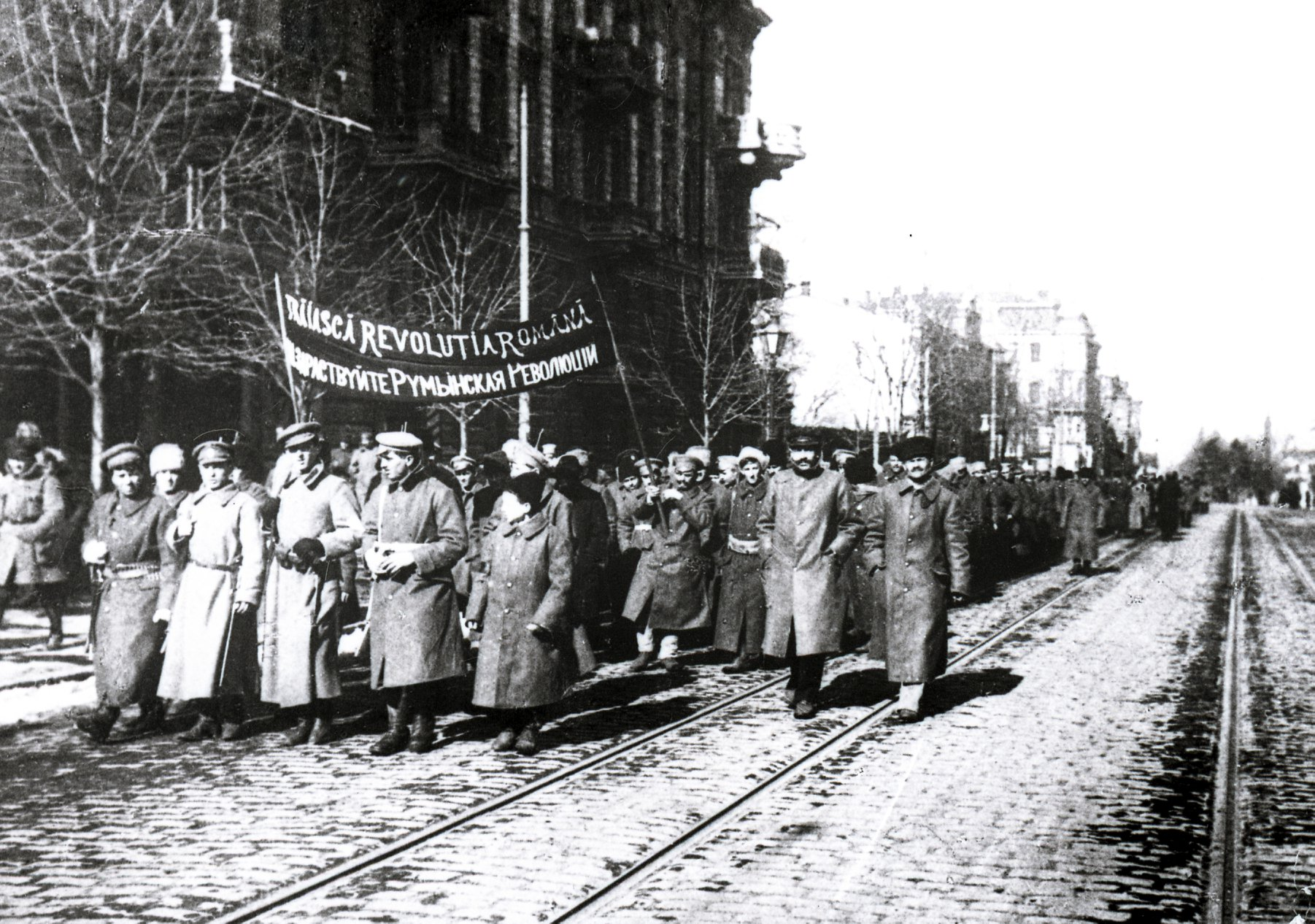
- The ethnic-Romanian Revolutionary Battalion in Odessa, 1918
Date	7 November 1917 – April 1921
Location	Crimea, Ukraine, Don, Kuban, Caucasus
Result	Bolshevik victory

Belligerents
South Russia; Don Republic; Kuban Republic; (Ukrainian State) Ukraine (1918); Crimea	Soviet Russia; (Ukrainian Soviet Socialist Republic) Soviet Ukraine; Ankara Government Makhnovshchina	(Ukrainian People's Republic) Ukraine (1917–1918, 1918–1921); (Democratic Republic of Georgia) Georgia; (First Republic of Armenia) Armenia; (Azerbaijan Democratic Republic) Azerbaijan; Mountainous Republic of the Northern Caucasus (until 1919)

Commanders and leaders
(South Russia (1919–1920)) Lavr Kornilov; (South Russia (1919–1920)) Anton Denikin; Pyotr Wrangel; (South Russia (1919–1920)) Mikhail Alexeyev; (South Russia (1919–1920)) (Don Republic) Peter Krasnov; Andrei Shkuro; (Don Republic) Konstantin Mamontov; (Ukrainian State) Pavlo Skoropadsky	(Russian Soviet Federative Socialist Republic) Mikhail Tukhachevsky; (Russian Soviet Federative Socialist Republic) Semyon Budyonny; (Russian Soviet Federative Socialist Republic) Mikhail Frunze; (Russian Soviet Federative Socialist Republic) Kliment Voroshilov; (Russian Soviet Federative Socialist Republic) Joseph Stalin; Nestor Makhno Kâzım Karabekir	(Ukrainian People's Republic) Symon Petliura; (Democratic Republic of Georgia) Noe Zhordania; (Democratic Republic of Georgia) Parmen Chichinadze; (First Republic of Armenia) Alexander Khatisian; (First Republic of Armenia) Drastamat Kanayan; (Azerbaijan Democratic Republic) Nasib bey Yusifbeyli; (Azerbaijan Democratic Republic) Samad bey Mehmandarov

Units involved
Volunteer Army; Don Army; Caucasus Army; Wrangel's Forces	(Russian Soviet Federative Socialist Republic) Red Army: Estonian Red Army Revolutionary Insurgent Army of Ukraine Turkish Land Forces	(Ukrainian People's Republic) Ukrainian People's Army (Democratic Republic of Georgia) Georgian People's Guard (First Republic of Armenia) Armenian National Corps (Azerbaijan Democratic Republic) National Army of the Azerbaijani DR

Strength
Volunteer Army 8,000–40,000; Armed Forces of South Russia 150,000	100,000–260,000	Ukrainian People's Army 100,000 (at its peak in 1918); Georgian People's Guard 27,000 (active) 87,000 (potential conscripts); Armenian National Corps 40,000 (1920); National Army of the ADR 40,000 (1920)

The Southern Front was a military theater of the Russian Civil War.

== Don revolts and formation of the Volunteer Army ==
In the aftermath of the October Revolution, politicians and army officers hostile to the Bolsheviks gravitated to the Don Cossack Host after its ataman, General Aleksey Kaledin, publicly offered sanctuary to opponents of the Soviet regime. Among those seeking refuge in the Don was the former chief of staff of the tsarist army, General Mikhail Alekseyev, who immediately began organizing a military unit to oppose both the Bolsheviks and the Central Powers. Alekseyev was soon joined by other prominent tsarist generals, including the charismatic Lavr Kornilov. The two men, along with Kaledin, assumed top roles in the anticommunist White movement taking shape in the Don region during the winter of 1917 – 18.

Militarily, the White forces remained weak into the spring of 1918. The ranks of the Volunteer Army formed by Alekseyev and Kornilov never exceeded over 4,000 combatants during its first months. On paper, Kaledin held nominal command over tens of thousands of Don Cossacks but most of these were either unwilling to fight or were outright opposed to his rule. Without substantial help from the Don Cossacks, the tiny Volunteer Army was unable to prevent the Red Guards under Vladimir Antonov-Ovseyenko from overrunning the Don region in late February 1918. To escape the Red onslaught, the Volunteer Army was forced to flee south into the lands of the Kuban Cossack Host while Kaledin remained behind and committed suicide.

During the months of March and April 1918, the Volunteer Army incorporated anticommunist Kuban Cossacks into its ranks and made an abortive attempt to capture the Kuban capital of Yekaterinodar from Red forces. Among the casualties in the latter operation was Kornilov, leaving General Anton Denikin to assume command of the Volunteer Army. In early May this so-called "Icy March" ended when the Volunteer Army returned to the Don Cossack Host, which by then was experiencing widespread revolts against Soviet occupation.

The anticommunist insurrection in the Don began in early April 1918 amid Cossack and peasant furor against Bolshevik food-requisitioning detachments. As ordinary Don Cossacks eagerly took up arms that spring, a Don Cossack Army was formed and a new elected ataman, General Pyotr N. Krasnov, took office. Krasnov established cordial relations with the German army of occupation in neighboring Ukraine, and through them he received arms and munitions, some of which he forwarded to the Volunteer Army.

During the summer and fall of 1918, the Don Cossacks under Krasnov continued to the campaign to liberate their homeland from the Red Army while Denikin's Volunteer Army cleared the Kuban Cossack Host and other areas of the North Caucasus of Red forces. In the winter of 1918 – 19, after the Volunteer Army had shattered the main Red forces in the North Caucasus, it redirected its efforts to the north in the Donbas region as the Don Cossacks again lost heart and began to give ground to their Red opponents.

== The Armed Forces of South Russia ==
On 8 January 1919, as the Don Cossack Army was collapsing due to plummeting morale among its troops, Krasnov subordinated his forces to Denikin thereby creating the Armed Forces of South Russia (AFSR). The Volunteer Army was renamed the Caucasian Volunteer Army. However, it reverted to its original name in May 1919. Besides the Volunteer and Don armies, the AFSR eventually included the Crimean-Azov Army, the Army of the Caucasus and the Army of Turkestan.

In the spring of 1919, anticommunist revolts again erupted among Don Cossacks behind the Red Army front in the upper Don region. Despite considerable Soviet efforts to crush the rebellion, the Don Cossack insurgents managed to hold out until the Don Cossack Army was able to go over to the offensive and relieve them in early June. Meanwhile, the Volunteer Army in the Donbas region was also able to go over the offensive, managing to take Kharkov on 25 June, Kursk on 20 September and Oryol on 13 October. On the eastern end of the AFSR's front, the Caucasian Army under Baron Pyotr Wrangel captured Tsaritsyn on 30 June.

Despite the AFSR’s successes in the summer and autumn of 1919, its rear was beset by rampant corruption among administrators, anti-White revolts among various ethnic groups, anarchist uprisings, pogroms against Jews and political infighting between the White generals and Cossack leaders. In October, Red Army counterattacks managed to recapture Oryol from the Volunteer Army while the Red Cavalry Corps under Semyon Budyonny drove a wedge between the Volunteer Army and Don Cossack Army. With no stable rear to fall back on, the remnants of the AFSR eventually retreated south to the Crimea and behind the Don River. In late February 1920, the Red Army renewed its attacks and succeeded in forcing the Whites to abandon the North Caucasus. Amid a disastrous evacuation at Novorossiysk, tens of thousands of Volunteer and Don Cossack troops did manage to embark on ships that transported them safely to the Crimean Peninsula. But due to insufficient tonnage, an even greater number of Cossack soldiers and civilians fleeing with the Whites were left behind at Novorossiysk where they were forced to either surrender or continue to retreat south.

After reaching the Crimea in early April 1920 Denikin, the Commander-in-chief of the AFSR, passed all his powers to General Wrangel, who re-formed these units into his Russian Army.

== Wrangel's Russian Army ==
The formation of Wrangel's "Russian Army" heralded the last phase of the Russian Civil War in the South. The Crimean peninsula served as the White's last stronghold, where all the remnants of the other defeated White Armies gathered. In May 1920, the Reds destroyed the Army of the Caucasus, which had been part of the AFSR; the survivor's fled either to join Wrangel or to Georgia. By July 1920 Wrangel had 25,000 infantry, 5,000 cavalry, 13 tanks, 25 armored cars, 40 aircraft, 2 battleships, 3 cruisers, 11 destroyers, 4 submarines and 8 gunboats. This expanded by October 1920 to 41,000 infantry and 17,000 cavalry. However, despite the rise in manpower, Wrangel was unable to undertake a successful offensive towards Moscow or break out of his Crimean stronghold. A raid into the Kuban area in August 1920 under the command of General Sergei Georgievich Ulagay failed to expand White-held territory.

The final assault on the Crimea by the Bolshevik re-constituted Southern Front (early November, 1920) under the command of Mikhail Frunze proved successful in defeating the last great White threat to the Reds. Entente vessels evacuated the last survivors of the White armies to Istanbul (16 November 1920). In 1921 they transferred to Bulgaria and Yugoslavia, where they finally disbanded.

== Ukraine in the Southern Front ==
At the same time, the Reds were also fighting against the Ukrainians, as well as the Poles. With the defeat of Germany in the First World War, the pro-German Government, The Hetmanate, under Pavlo Skoropadsky was overthrown and the relative safety Ukraine had under German occupation and protection was gone. The Reds set up their own Bolshevik Ukrainian government. The Ukrainian National Republic (UNR) faced many enemies from late 1918 onward. It faced the Reds to the north-east, Whites (who were against Ukrainian separation) to the south-east marching northwards against Moscow and the Anarchist Revolutionary Insurgent Army of Ukraine of Nestor Makhno springing up all over Ukraine. The UNR came to terms with the Rumanians and the Entente who occupied Odessa in February 1919, and this allowed the UNR to release troops to face the Whites, Reds and Poles. Fighting broke out in January 1919 and the Reds pushed the Ukrainian forces back. Kiev fell to the Reds in February 1919 and had pushed the UNR's forces against Polish ones moving into Volhynia. This cut the UNR's armies in two. By May 1919, the UNR occupied a small strip of land around Brody and at the same time were negotiating with the Poles, with an armistice with the Poles, the Ukrainians could push forwards and they attacked south-eastwards to Kamanets Podil'skyi. With Denikin launching an offensive against the Reds in the north, along with spontaneous peasant uprisings allowed the Ukrainians to retake Kiev in August 1919, but they were expelled by Denikin's forces. With Denikin's defeat and the Ukrainians in severe trouble, they made an alliance with the Poles in April 1920, the combined Polish-Ukrainian forces pushed back the Reds, who occupied most of Ukraine. This was part of the Polish–Soviet War, and ended up with gains for Poland after the treaty of Riga in 1921, but with nothing for the Ukrainians who were fully defeated. The Ukrainians based in Poland tried to launch offensives and raids into Soviet Ukraine, but these failed considerably.

== Georgia ==
With the defeat of the Whites in 1920, the Georgian Democratic Republic was under threat from the Red Army moving ever closer to her borders. The Reds offered an alliance with Georgia, Armenia and Azerbaijan in order to defeat the Whites in the Caucasus, etc. The Georgians refused, going for a policy of neutrality; they also hoped they could negotiate their official independence with the Bolsheviks. Several attempts by Russians and Soviets to take over Georgia failed. In April 1920, the Soviets managed to place a Bolshevik regime in Azerbaijan, mainly due to the help of the 11th Soviet Red Army. Georgian communists asked for permission to take over Georgia but no real authorization was given. On May 3, communists loyal to the Russian SFSR launched a coup in Tbilisi, which was defeated by the Georgian army. The Georgian General staff started to mobilize and ready themselves for war, however this never came, as negotiations with the Reds (May 1920) managed to secure their independence, on the conditions that they allowed Bolshevik groups and organizations to exist and that no foreign troops could enter Georgian soil. Refused entry into the League of Nations, Georgia gained de jure recognition from the Allies on January 27, 1921. This, however, did not prevent the country from being attacked by Soviet Russia a month later.

The peace with Georgia, though initially supported strongly by Lenin, finally ended on February 11 when the Armenian and Georgian Bolsheviks organized a revolt in Lorri. The Armenia-based 11th Red Army marched on Tbilisi, while other Russian forces invaded from various directions. By February 25, the desperate resistance of the poorly organized Georgian military was broken at the capital and the Georgian Bolsheviks proclaimed the Georgian Soviet Socialist Republic. Almost simultaneously, Turkish troops took control over Ardahan Province, Artvin, and Batumi. On March 17, the Menshevik and Soviet representatives agreed to a ceasefire and joined their efforts to recover Batumi. On March 18, the leadership of the DRG left Georgia by the French ship Ernest Renan. By the Moscow-dictated Treaty of Kars with Turkey (October 13, 1921), Georgia had to abandon its claims on Artvin and Ardahan provinces in return for Batumi granted autonomous status within Soviet Georgia. Abkhazia and South Ossetia also gained autonomy.

Qoroghli, near Tbilisi, has a monument to the Georgian Junkers who fell in battles against the Red Army. Guerrilla resistance to the Soviet troops continued, but was finally crushed in 1924. This was followed by harsh repressions and the reign of terror in which thousands of Georgian nobles, intellectuals and common citizens were purged. The country was eventually incorporated into the Soviet Union — first as a part of a Transcaucasian SFSR (1922), then as its own Soviet Socialist Republic (1936).

== Armenia ==
Since 1918, the Armenian Republic had been at odds with almost all of her neighbors, several wars were fought with her fellow newly formed Caucasian nations, as well as a hard-fought war with the Turks in 1920. With enemies all around, the Armenians were weak and unable to defend themselves against an invasion by the Bolsheviks.

== Azerbaijan ==
By March 1920, it was obvious that Soviet Russia would attack the much-needed Baku. Vladimir Lenin said that the invasion was justified by the fact that Soviet Russia couldn't survive without Baku oil. According to prevailing opinion in Moscow, Russian Bolsheviks were to assist Baku proletariat in overthrowing the "counter-revolutionary nationalists."

After major political crisis, the Fifth Cabinet of Ministers of the Azerbaijan Democratic Republic gave its resignations on April 1, 1920. On April 25, 1920, the Russian XI Red Army crossed into Azerbaijan and entered Baku on April 27. They demanded the dissolution of Azerbaijani Parliament (Majlis) and set up their own Bolshevik government headed by Nariman Narimanov. The deputies obliged to do so to avoid bloodshed, and on April 28, 1920, the ADR officially ceased to exist. The Red Army met very little resistance from Azerbaijani forces in Baku, which were tied up on Karabakh front.

In May 1920, there was a major uprising against the occupying Russian XI Army in Ganja, intent on restoring Musavatists in power. The uprising was crushed by the Bolsheviks by May 31. Leaders of the ADR either fled to Menshevik Georgia, Turkey and Iran, or were captured by Bolsheviks, like Mammed Amin Rasulzade (who was later allowed to emigrate) and executed (like Gen. Selimov, Gen. Sulkevich, Gen. Agalarov, a total of over 20 generals), or assassinated by Armenian militants like Fatali Khan Khoyski and Behbudagha Javanshir. Most students and citizens traveling abroad remained in those countries never to return again to their country.

== See also ==
- Bibliography of the Russian Revolution and Civil War
- Outline of the Russian Revolution and Civil War
- Index of articles related to the Russian Revolution and Civil War
- The "Russian" Civil Wars, 1916–1926: Ten Years That Shook the World
- Russia in Flames: War, Revolution, Civil War, 1914–1921
- Russia in Revolution: An Empire in Crisis, 1890 to 1928
- Russia: Revolution and Civil War, 1917—1921
- The Russian Revolution: A New History
- Kuban People's Republic
- Ukraine after the Russian Revolution
