= Caucasus Army (Armed Forces of South Russia) =

Russian Civil War

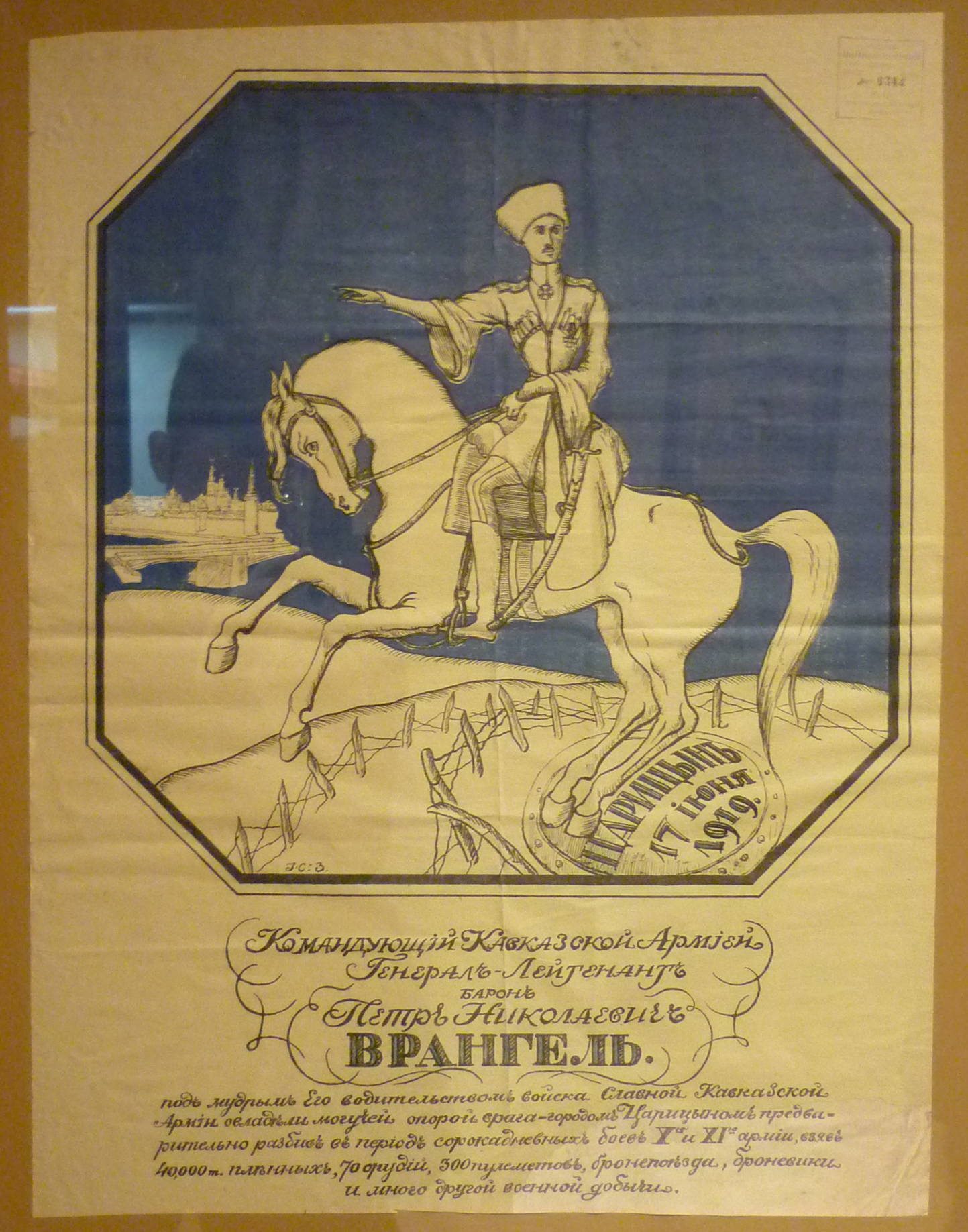
General Wrangel, commander of the Caucasus Army, after taking Tsaritsyn.

The Caucasus Army (Russian: Кавка́зская а́рмия), was a Russian army which was a part of the White movement during the Russian Civil War. It operated from May 1919 to January 1920, in the Tsaritsyn - Saratov area.

== History ==
On 23 January 1919, the Volunteer Army was renamed Volunteer Army of the Caucasus. And on 22 May 1919, the Volunteer Army of the Caucasus was divided in two armies: The Caucasus Army, which advanced along the Tsaritsyn-Saratov line and the Volunteer Army, which advanced along the Kursk-Oryol line.

The Caucasus Army was composed of 4 corps and 1 cavalry division:

- 1st Kuban Corps (Gen. Pokrovsky)
- 2nd Kuban Corps (Gen. Ulaguy, later Gen. Nahumenko)
- 4th Corps (Gen. Shatilov, later Gen. Toporkov)
- 5th Corps (Gen. Józefovic)

On 5 July 1919, the Caucasus Army had 23.234 men, but 3 months later it only counted 15.079 men after the transfer of the 2nd Corps to the Don Army; along with 384 machineguns, 85 pieces of artillery, 15 airplanes and 7 armoured trains.

On 29 January 1920, the Caucasus Army was dissolved and succeeded by the Kuban Army.

== Commanders of the Caucasus Army ==
- Lieutenant-general Pyotr Wrangel (21 May — 8 December 1919)
- Lieutenant-general Viktor Pokrovsky (9 December 1919 — 8 February 1920)
