= The "Russian" Civil Wars, 1916–1926: Ten Years That Shook the World =

2015 book by Jonathan D. Smele

The 'Russian' Civil Wars, 1916–1926: Ten Years That Shook the World
- Author: Jonathan D. Smele
- Language: English
- Subject: Russian Civil War
- Genre: Military history
- Publisher: Hurst & Company (UK); Oxford University Press (US)
- Publication date: 2015
- Publication place: United Kingdom
- Media type: Print (hardback and paperback), e-book
- Pages: 423
- ISBN: 978-1-84904-424-0

The "Russian" Civil Wars, 1916–1926: Ten Years That Shook the World is a 2015 book by the historian Jonathan D. Smele, published by Hurst & Company and Oxford University Press. Smele argues that the Russian Civil War was in fact several overlapping wars, many fought by non-Russians far beyond Russia, and dates them from 1916 to 1926 rather than 1918 to 1921. (Note: The subtitle alludes to John Reed's Ten Days That Shook the World.)

== Synopsis ==
Smele makes three arguments: the collapse of the Russian Empire produced several overlapping civil wars, not one single war; "Russian" belongs in quotation marks, since many of those involved were not Russian and significant fighting occurred outside Russia proper in their colonial territories; and the period spanned a decade, not just four years. Rejecting the traditional starting date of 1918 and the disbanding of the Russian Constituent Assembly, he traces the origins of the civil war to the Central Asian revolt of 1916 against conscription and the Basmachi movement; he dates Red–White fighting from the Kornilov affair in September 1917; and closes his account of the civil war in June 1926 when the Turkestan Front became the Central Asian Military District.

Geographically the book spans from Finland in the north, to Mongolia in the east, and the Caucasus in the south, covering the Red, White Movement, and Green movements. He interweaves Russian–Ukrainian, Polish–Ukrainian and Georgian–Armenian fighting, as well as the Allied intervention, war communism, the various peasant revolts and famine into a narrative of the Civil War beyond the major centers of fighting between Reds and Whites. Smele questions the definition of "winning" the Civil War, noting the Bolsheviks won nominal control of most of the Russia empire and its western urban centers, but cites significant defeats in Finland, the Baltic states and Poland, as well as a retreat from much of the peasant dominated countryside. He argues that the New Economic Policy secured the revolution's survival and a nominal "win" of the Civil War.

== Reception ==
Eric Lohr wrote in Slavic Review that Smele's "erudition and assimilation of a broad array of sources is astounding"; Rex A. Wade, in The Slavonic and East European Review, called it "a very fine book", praising its treatment of the peripheries; Aaron B. Retish, in The American Historical Review, found it exceptionally readable; and Peter Whitewood, in War in History, wrote that it reframed late Russian and early Soviet history.

Several reviewers rejected the dating. Wade called the span the least persuasive of the book's points; Lohr saw no continuity between 1916 revolt and the later fighting between the Reds and Whites; Anatol Shmelev, in The Russian Review, called the 1926 endpoint a "pure formality", noted that Smele never defines "civil war", and argued that including wars such as the Finnish Civil War made the book seem more Russocentric, proposing "Eurasian" in place of "Russian". Lohr also judged the text loose with statistics; Natalia Kovalyova, in Europe-Asia Studies, found the voices of ordinary people largely absent.

== Academic journal reviews ==
- Kovalyova, Natalia (2017). "Review of The 'Russian' Civil Wars 1916–1926: Ten Years That Shook the World by Jonathan D. Smele". Europe-Asia Studies. 69 (3): 533–535. doi:10.1080/09668136.2017.1299930.
- Lohr, Eric (2017). "Review of The "Russian" Civil Wars, 1916–1926: Ten Years That Shook the World by Jonathan D. Smele". Slavic Review. 76 (4): 1123–1124. doi:10.1017/slr.2017.321.
- Retish, Aaron B. (2017). "Review of The "Russian" Civil Wars, 1916–1926: Ten Years That Shook the World by Jonathan D. Smele". The American Historical Review. 122 (3): 955. doi:10.1093/ahr/122.3.955.
- Sablin, Ivan (2017). "Review of The "Russian" Civil Wars, 1916–1926: Ten Years That Shook the World by Jonathan D. Smele". Ab Imperio. 2017 (1): 402–406. doi:10.1353/imp.2017.0021.
- Shmelev, Anatol (2016). "Review of The "Russian" Civil Wars, 1916–1926: Ten Years That Shook the World by Jonathan D. Smele". The Russian Review. 75 (4): 713–714. JSTOR 43919665.
- Wade, Rex A. (2016). "Review of The 'Russian' Civil Wars, 1916–1926: Ten Years That Shook the World by Jonathan D. Smele". The Slavonic and East European Review. 94 (4): 760–762. doi:10.5699/slaveasteurorev2.94.4.0760.
- Whitewood, Peter (2018). "Review of The 'Russian' Civil Wars, 1916–1926: Ten Years That Shook the World by Jonathan Smele". War in History. 25 (2): 285–286. doi:10.1177/0968344518760407d.

== Release information ==
- Hardback: Hurst & Company, 2015. 423 pp. Oxford University Press, 2016. 423 pp.
- Paperback: Hurst & Company, 2016. 423 pp. Oxford University Press, 2017. 423 pp.
- E-book: Issued by Hurst, distributed through Oxford Scholarship Online.

== See also ==
- Bibliography of the Russian Revolution and Civil War
- Outline of the Russian Revolution and Civil War
- Index of articles related to the Russian Revolution and Civil War
- Russia in Flames: War, Revolution, Civil War, 1914–1921
- Russia in Revolution: An Empire in Crisis, 1890 to 1928
- A People's Tragedy: The Russian Revolution: 1891-1924
- Russia: Revolution and Civil War, 1917—1921
- The Russian Revolution: A New History
