= Peter Kenez =

Historian (born 1937)

Peter Kenez (Hungarian: Kenéz Péter; born 1937) is a Hungarian-American historian specializing in Russian and Eastern European history and politics.

== Life ==
Kenez was born and grew up in Pesterzsébet, Budapest, Kingdom of Hungary. His father was arrested in March 1944 after Operation Margarethe and deported to the Auschwitz concentration camp and killed. His mother fled to Budapest with him, where they survived the persecution of the Jews by the Eichmann-Kommando and the Arrow Cross Party.

After the Hungarian uprising of 1956 he fled to the US. He received his PhD from Harvard University under the advisor Richard Pipes. He has taught at the University of California, Santa Cruz, since 1966, where he is currently Professor Emeritus. He also teaches courses on Soviet cinema and an interdisciplinary course on the Holocaust with literature professor Murray Baumgarten.

== Books ==
- Before the Uprising: Hungary under Communism, 1949–1956. Cambridge University Press, 2022.
- The Coming of the Holocaust: From Antisemitism to Genocide, Cambridge University Press, 2013.
- Hungary from the Nazis to the Soviets: The Establishment of the Communist Regime in Hungary, 1944–1948, New York, Cambridge University Press, 2006.
- Cinema and Soviet Society from the Revolution to the Death of Stalin, London and New York, I.B. Tauris, 2001.
- A History of the Soviet Union from the Beginning to the End, New York, Cambridge University Press, 1999; 2nd ed., 2006.
- Varieties of Fear: Growing Up Jewish under Nazism and Communism, Washington, American University Press, 1995.
- Cinema and Soviet Society, 1917–1953, Cambridge University Press, 1992.
- Bolshevik Culture: Experiment and Order in the Russian Revolution, edited with Abbott Gleason and Richard Stites, Indiana University Press, 1985.
- The Birth of the Propaganda State: Soviet Methods of Mass Mobilization, 1917–1929, Cambridge et New York, Cambridge University Press, 1985.
- Civil War in South Russia, 1919–1920: The Defeat of the Whites, Berkeley, University of California Press, 1977.
- Civil War in South Russia, 1918: The First Year of the Volunteer Army, Berkeley, University of California Press, 1971.
