= 13th Army (RSFSR) =

Military unit of the red army

The 13th Army was a field army of the Red Army during the Russian Civil War, which existed between 5 March 1919 and 12 November 1920.

== History ==
Its predecessor was the Group of Forces on the Kursk direction, formed on 18 November 1918, under leadership of I.S. Kozhevnikov from troops arriving from the frontlines of the First World War. After its assignment to the Southern Front in December 1918, where it participated in January 1919 in the successful Voronezh–Povorino Operation, it was renamed as the Donetsk Group of Forces in February 1919, and in March reformed as the 13th Army.

In Spring 1919, it suffered serious losses in the Battle of the Donbass. In August and September 1919, together with the 8th Army, it became part of the Selivachyov Group, named after its commander Vladimir Selivachyov. On 10 January 1920 the Southern Front was renamed as the Southwestern of which the 13th Army remained a part. In September 1920 it was assigned to the second creation of the Southern Front, at that time fighting against Wrangel.

During the Civil War the Army's force structure was highly dynamic with most subunits operating as part of operational groups. These included Special (reserve) Group (two regiments and a battery), Left Group (two divisions, cavalry and infantry brigades), Shock Group (Latvian division, Cossack cavalry brigade and separate brigade), and Perekopskaya Group (Latvian and 3rd divisions, 8th cavalry division, Nesterov group, and later 52nd division and 85th brigade of the 29th division). This last group fought on the approaches to Crimea, and experienced many changes, at one time including a group of armoured trains and the 1st Cavalry corps, but was eventually split between the Ekaterinoslav direction group of forces and the 6th Army. The rest of the 13th fought towards the southern coast of the Black sea between Perekop and north-east of Odessa. In October 1920 the army lost many of its units to the 2nd Cavalry Army.

This first 13th Army participated in operations spanning an area from the southern Kursk gubernia to then Crimea. She fought against Denikin, the Don nationalist Cossacks and Wrangel. participated in the offensive into Donbass, and its defence, the Orel–Kursk operation and in the Perekop-Chongar Operation.

On November 12, 1920 the 13th Army was disbanded. Its administration was merged with the management of the 4th Army.
Its last location of headquarters was in the city of Slavyansk.

== Commanders ==
- Innokentiy Kozhevnikov : 06.03.1919 — 16.04.1919
- Anatoliy Gekker : 16.04.1919 — 18.02.1920
- Ivan Pauka :18.02.1920 — 05.07.1920
- Robert Eideman 05.07.1920 — 10.07.1920
- Ieronim Uborevich : 10.07.1920 — 11.11.1920

Members of the Revolutionary Military Council include

- Georgy Pyatakov (28.07.1919 — 03.11.1919)
- Arkady Rosengolts (07.10.1919 — 19.12.1919)
- Volodymyr Zatonsky (22.05.1919 — 26.07.1920)
