= Russia: Revolution and Civil War, 1917—1921 =

2022 history book by Antony Beevor

- First edition (W&N)
- Author: Antony Beevor
- Audio read by: Michael Page
- Language: English
- Subject: History of Russia, History of the Soviet Union, The Russian Revolution
- Genre: Non-fiction, history
- Publisher: Viking Press, Weidenfeld & Nicolson, Tantor
- Publication date: 2022
- Publication place: United Kingdom
- Pages: 592pp (original hardback edition)
- ISBN: 978-0593493878
- Website: Author's website, Weidenfeld & Nicolson

Russia: Revolution and Civil War, 1917—1921 is a history of the Russian Revolution and Civil War, written by Antony Beevor and published by Viking Press and Weidenfeld & Nicolson in 2022 in a hardback edition and by Tantor Audio as an audiobook.

== Reviews ==
- Anthony, A. (5 June 2022) Russia: Revolution and Civil War 1917-1921 by Antony Beevor review – butchery of the Bolsheviks. The Guardian.
- Beer, D. (15 June 2022) What Antony Beevor gets wrong about Russia. The New Statesman.
- Kelly, C. (23 May 2022) Russia: Revolution and Civil War by Antony Beevor. The Financial Times.
- Lieven, D. (3 June 2022) Divided they fell: Bolshevik unity enabled victory over the Whites. The Times Literary Supplement.
- Staff, (3 June 2022) Russia: Revolution and Civil War 1917-1921 by Antony Beevor – a ‘grimly magnificent’ book. The Week.

== Publication history ==
- 2022 Original Viking hardback publication
- 2022 Original Tantor audiobook publication

== See also ==
- Bibliography of the Russian Revolution and Civil War
- Outline of the Russian Revolution and Civil War
- Index of articles related to the Russian Revolution and Civil War
- Russia in Flames: War, Revolution, Civil War, 1914–1921 (also published in 2017)
- Russia in Revolution: An Empire in Crisis, 1890 to 1928 (also published in 2017)
- Russia: Revolution and Civil War, 1917—1921
- The Russian Revolution: A New History
- A People's Tragedy: The Russian Revolution: 1891-1924
