= Russia in Flames =

History of the Russian Revolution and Civil War by Laura Engelstein

Russia in Flames: War, Revolution, Civil War, 1914–1921
- Book cover
- Author: Laura Engelstein
- Audio read by: Anne Flosnik
- Language: English
- Subject: Russian Revolution
- Genre: Non fiction, History
- Publisher: Oxford University Press
- Publication date: 2017
- Publication place: United States
- Media type: Hardcover, Paperback, Audiobook, Kindle
- Pages: 856
- ISBN: 978-0199794218
- Website: Oxford University Press book page

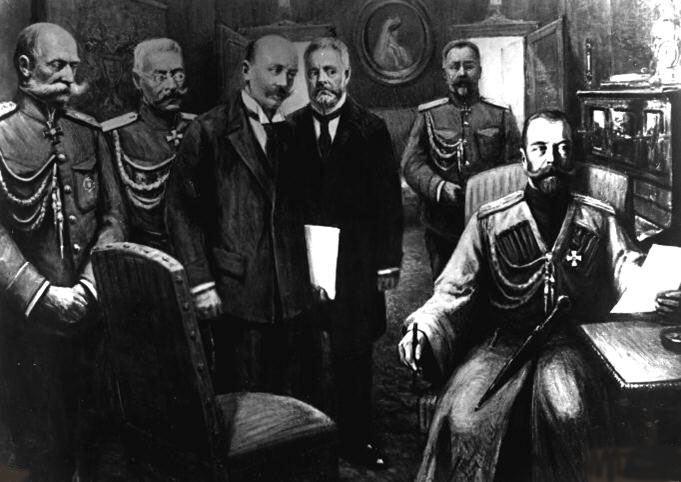
The abdication of Nicholas II

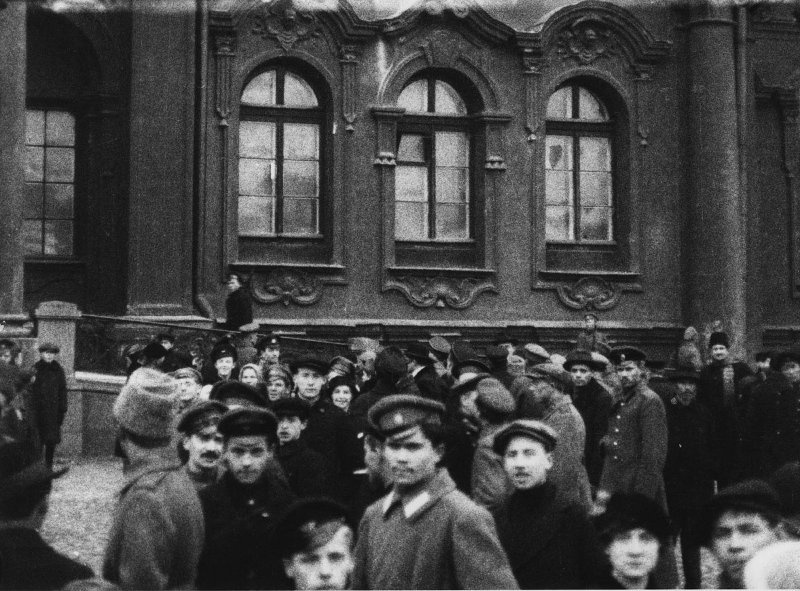
The capture of the Winter Palace

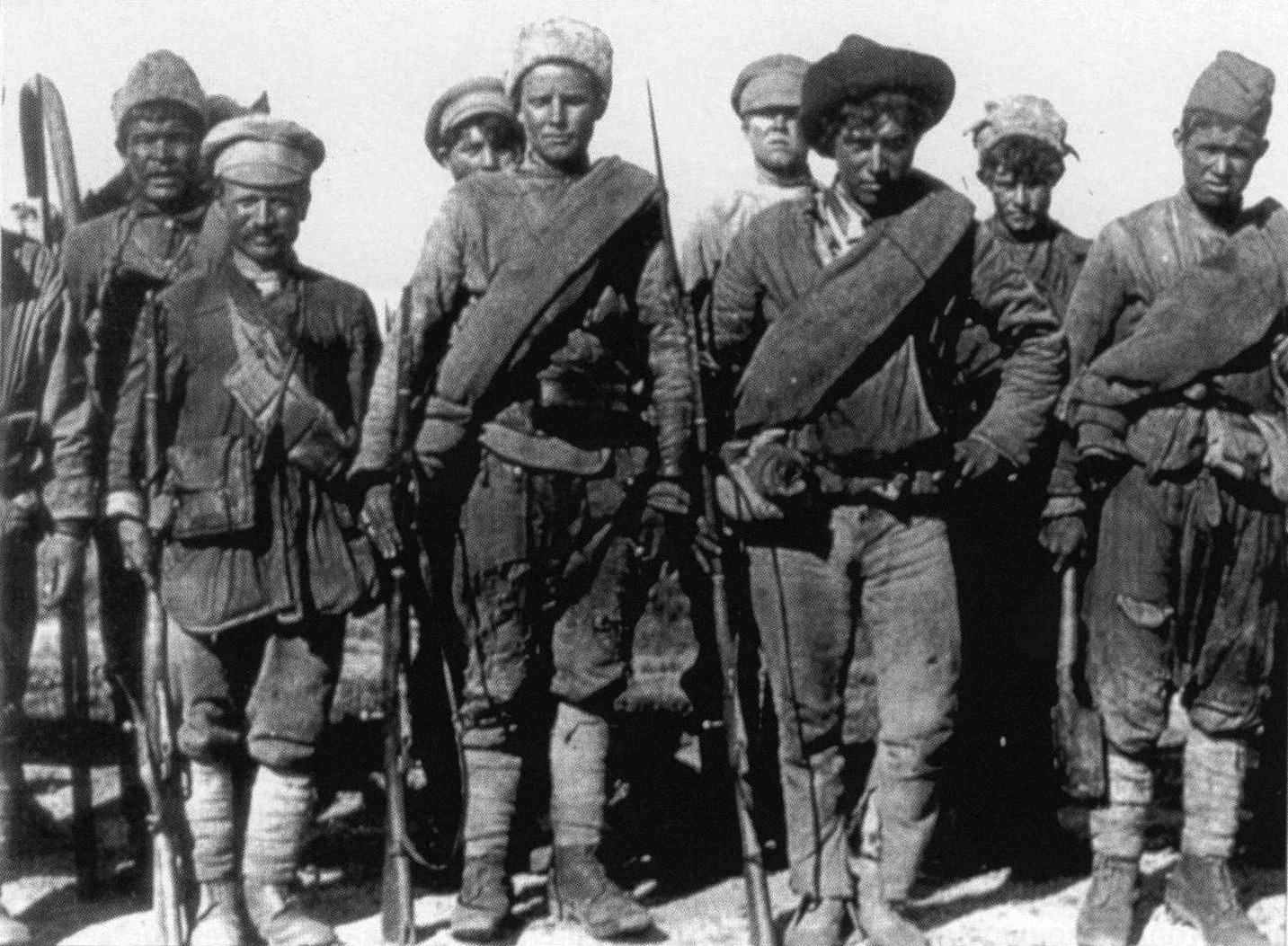
Siberian Army soldiers (anti-Bolshevik)

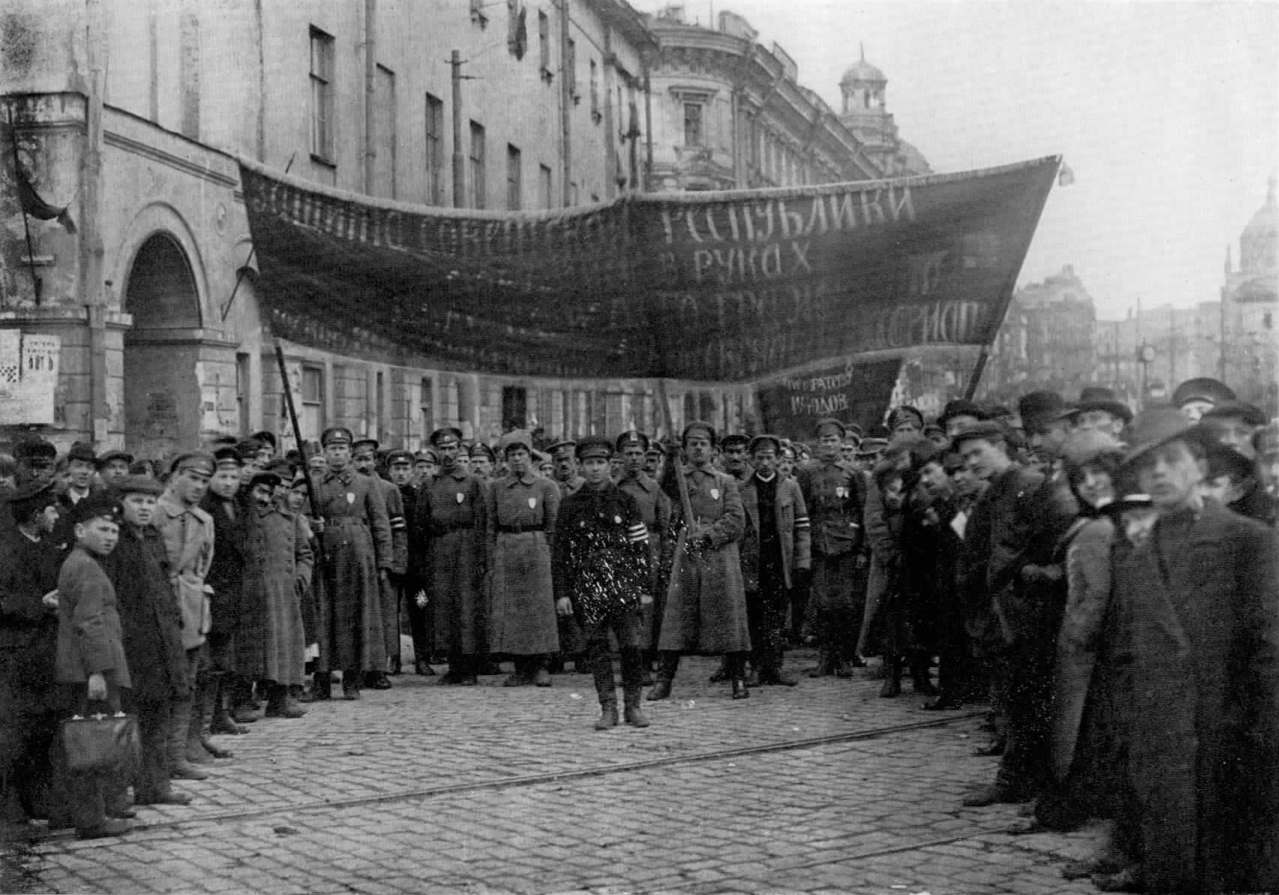
The Red Army in Moscow

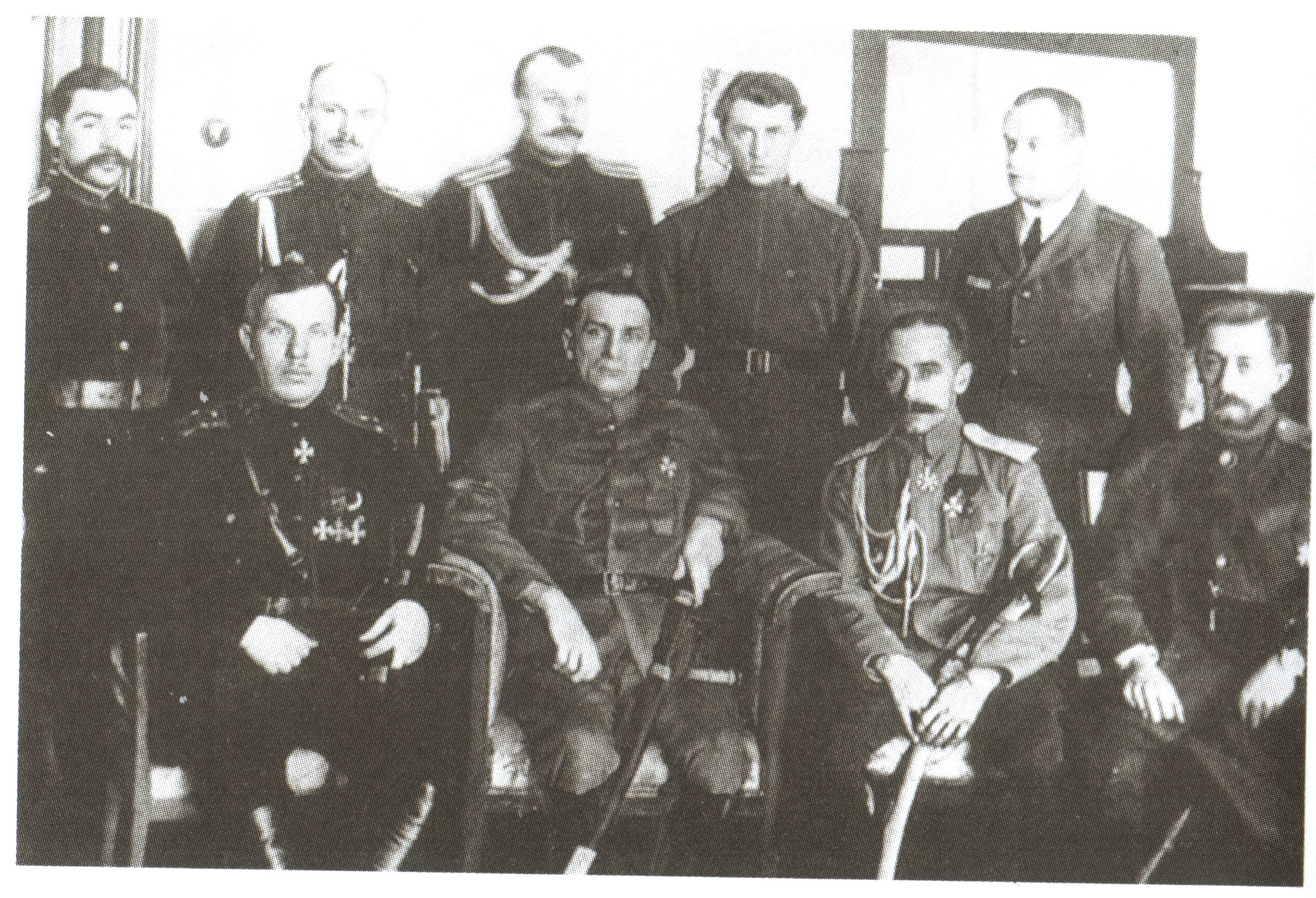
Siberian Army Headquarters

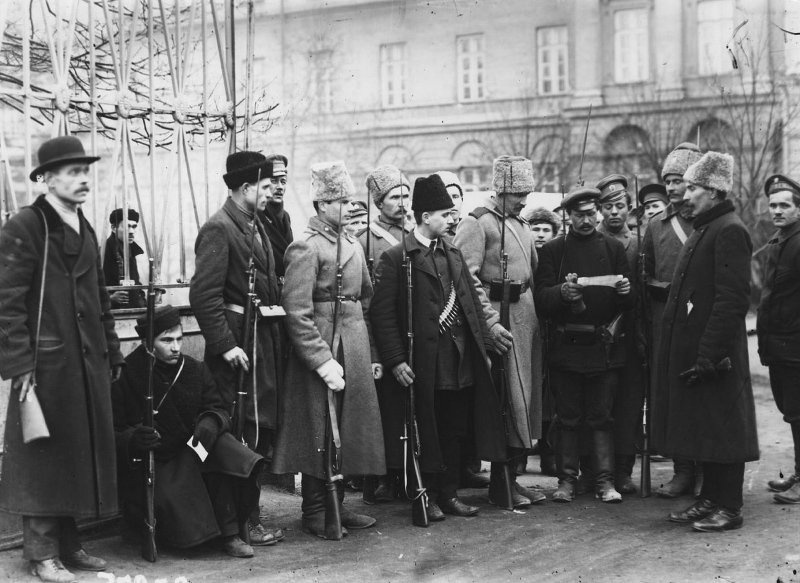
At the gates of Smolny Institute

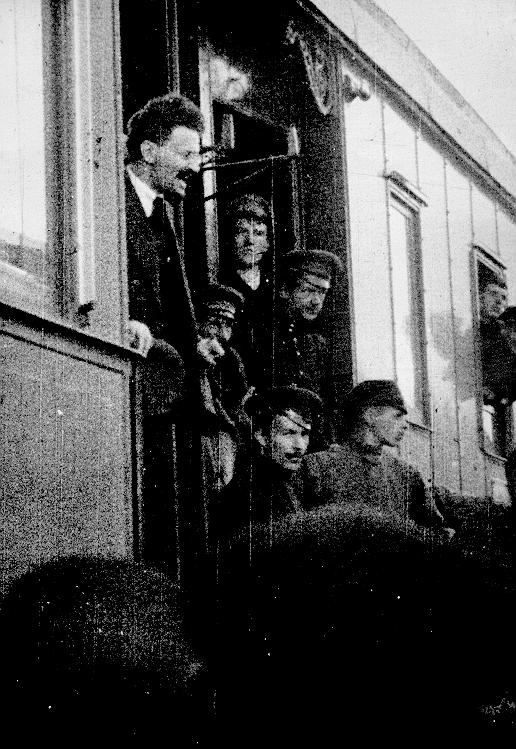
Leon Trotsky, 1917

Russia in Flames: War, Revolution, Civil War, 1914–1921 is a narrative history of the Russian Revolution and Civil War, written by Laura Engelstein and published in 2017 by Oxford University Press. The release was timed with the 100th anniversary of the Russian Revolution.

== Synopsis ==
Russia in Flames explores the period of 1914–1921 and how the procession of war, collapse, and disintegration (as the subtitle indicates) brought Russia communists to power and eventually resulted in the Bolsheviks dominating and then destroying other political, social, and military power centers.

Engelstein's work focuses on the "problem of power" and how the Bolsheviks navigated social, Marxist, and internal party politics to seize power, center it on themselves, and finally create a one party state. After this Engelstein explores how the Bolsheviks recreated government to exert control over both Russia and the Russian Empire and eventually win the Civil War. Along with the problem of power, Engelstein explores the role violence and propaganda filled in the seizure and consolidation of power, and how it was used to destroy existing institutions and power centers making way for the Bolshevik institutions, ideas, and authority which replaced them.

Engelstein argues that Lenin and the Bolsheviks "did not so much seize power but rather created it." She believe the collapse of the state and empire created a power vacuum that different revolutionary groups raced to fill. The main tools they employed to achieve total power were the unrestricted use of violence to destroy their political opponents, and the Red Army, created and led by Leon Trotsky, which despite its many limitations ultimately suppressed the white and green forces, and defeated the foreign interventions.

Engelstein narrates the events that took place between the February Revolution and the October Bolshevik coup the culminated the months of tension and deteriorating relationships within the socialist coalition government. Her analysis of how the coalition government disintegrated into Civil War disproves the misconception that the death and destruction brought on by the Civil War altered the "original character of the Bolshevik party.". (Note: Russia in Flames, pp.213) She asserts that violence and coercion were intentionally at the core of the party plan to assume full control in Russia and its empire and that the Bolsheviks saw the "civil war as the path to triumph.". (Note: Russia in Flames, pp.175)

== Structure ==
The book is divided into roughly equal halves; the first half primarily dealing with the period of Russian involvement in World War I and the revolution which followed, the second half focusing on the period of the Russian Civil War. The book is structured into six parts, with the first and final parts forming short bookends opening and closing the narrative:

- Part 1: The Last Years of the Old Empire, 1904–1914.
- Part 2: The Great War: Imperial Self-Destruction, 1914–1917.
- Part 3: The Contest For Control, 1917.
- Part 4: Sovereign Claims, 1918–1921.
- Part 5: The War Within, 1918–1921.
- Part 6: Victory and Retreat, 1921.

The book contains a ten-page bibliography essay as an appendix.

== Reception ==
In Europe Asia Studies, Daniel Orlovsky writes, "Laura Engelstein’s magnificent volume provides a fresh and comprehensive, though weighted toward the political, vision of the Russian Revolution. Positives abound in this long book, most important is her powerful and metaphorical language. She is able to turn a phrase that captures the meaning of salient historical trends."

Academic journal reviews

- Beyrau, Dietrich (2019). "Review of Russia in Flames. War, Revolution, Civil War, 1914–1921". Jahrbücher für Geschichte Osteuropas. 67 (3): 536–539. JSTOR 26903884.
- Coleman, Heather J. (2019). "Russia in Flames: War, Revolution, Civil War 1914-1921 by Laura Engelstein (review)". Histoire sociale/Social history. 52 (105): 229–231. doi:10.1353/his.2019.0017. S2CID 195532439.
- Harward, Grant T. (2020). "Review of Russia in Flames: War, Revolution, Civil War, 1914–1921". Army History (114): 43–44. JSTOR 26863621.
- Hearne, Siobhan (2019). "Russia in Flames: War, Revolution, Civil War, 1914–1921. By Laura Engelstein". History. 104 (361): 550–551. doi:10.1111/1468-229X.12813. S2CID 164238310.
- Korobeinikov, Aleksandr (21 October 2019). "Russia in Flames. War, Revolution, Civil War, 1914–1921". Europe-Asia Studies. 71 (9): 1615–1616. doi:10.1080/09668136.2019.1674531. S2CID 211342100.
- Lalande, J.-Guy (3 April 2019). "Russia in flames: war, revolution, civil war 1914–1921". Canadian Slavonic Papers. 61 (2): 251–253. doi:10.1080/00085006.2018.1555950. S2CID 158112934.
- Orlovsky, Daniel (2017). "Review of Russia in Flames: War, Revolution, Civil War, 1914–1921, EngelsteinLaura; The Russian Revolution: A New History, McMeekinSean; Russia in Revolution: An Empire in Crisis, 1890 to 1928, SmithS. A.; The Russian Revolution, 1905–1921, SteinbergMark D.". Slavic Review. 76 (3): 763–771. doi:10.1017/slr.2017.184. JSTOR 26565182.
- Sumpf, Alexandre (2018). "Review of Russia in Flames War, Revolution, Civil War, 1914–1921; Russia in Revolution An Empire in Crisis, 1890 to 1928, SMITH Steve A.; 1917 War, Peace and Revolution, Stevenson David". Cahiers du Monde russe. 59 (4): 631–635. doi:10.4000/monderusse.10687. JSTOR 26934366. S2CID 182446891.
- Ter-Grigoryan, Svetlana (2018). "Russia's Trial by Fire". Origins: Current Events in Historical Perspective. the History Departments at The Ohio State University and Miami University.
- "Russia in Flames: War, Revolution, Civil War, 1914-1921". The Center for East European and Russian/Eurasian Studies. University of Chicago. 2018.

== Release information ==
- Hardcover: 2017 (First Edition), Oxford University Press, 856pp. ISBN 978-0199794218. (Note: Also available as a Kindle eBook.)
- Paperback: 2019 (First Edition), Oxford University Press, 856pp. ISBN 978-0190931506.
- Audiobook: 2019, Narrated by Anne Flosnik, published by Tantor Audio.

== About the author ==
Laura Engelstein is an American historian and author who specializes in Russian and European history. She served as Henry S. McNeil Professor Emerita of Russian History at Yale University and taught at Cornell University and Princeton University.

== See also ==
- List of states and regions involved in the Russian Civil War
- Bibliography of the Russian Revolution and Civil War
- Outline of the Russian Revolution and Civil War
- Russian Revolution of 1905
- Eastern Front of the Russian Civil War
- Southern Front of the Russian Civil War
- North Russia Intervention
- Russia: Revolution and Civil War, 1917—1921 (book)
- Russia in Flames: War, Revolution, Civil War, 1914–1921 (book, also published in 2017)
- Russia in Revolution: An Empire in Crisis, 1890 to 1928 (book, also published in 2017)
- The Russian Revolution: A New History (book)
