= The Russian Revolution: A New History =

History of the Russian Revolution

- Book cover
- Author: Sean McMeekin
- Audio read by: Pete Larkin
- Language: English
- Subject: Russian Revolution, Russian Civil War
- Genre: Non-fiction, history
- Published: 2017
- Publisher: Basic Books, Hachette Book Group
- Publication place: United States
- Media type: Hardcover, paperback, Kindle, audiobook
- Pages: 496pp. (hardcover); 15 hours and 3 minutes (audiobook)
- ISBN: 978-0465039906
- Website: Book Website at Basic Books

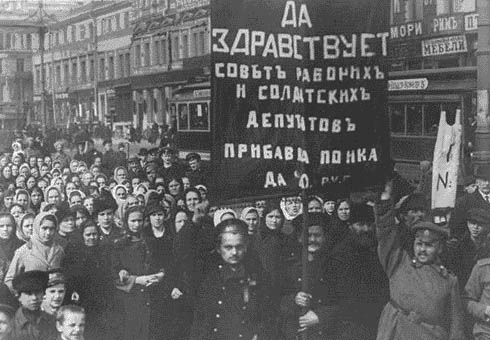
Revolutionaries protesting in February 1917

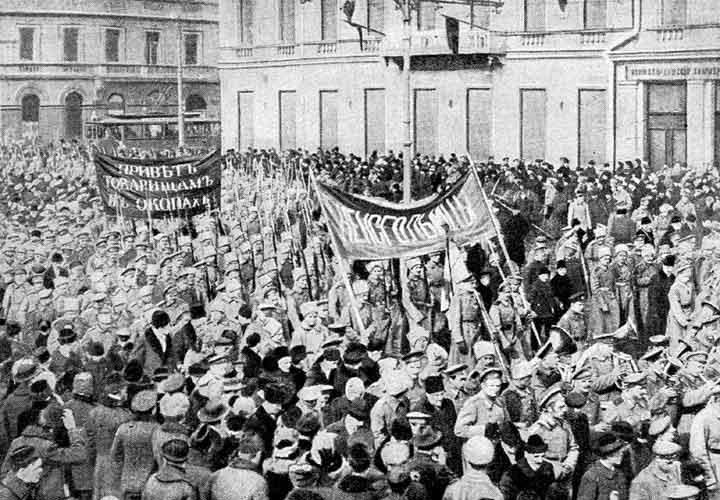
Soldiers marching in Petrograd, March 1917

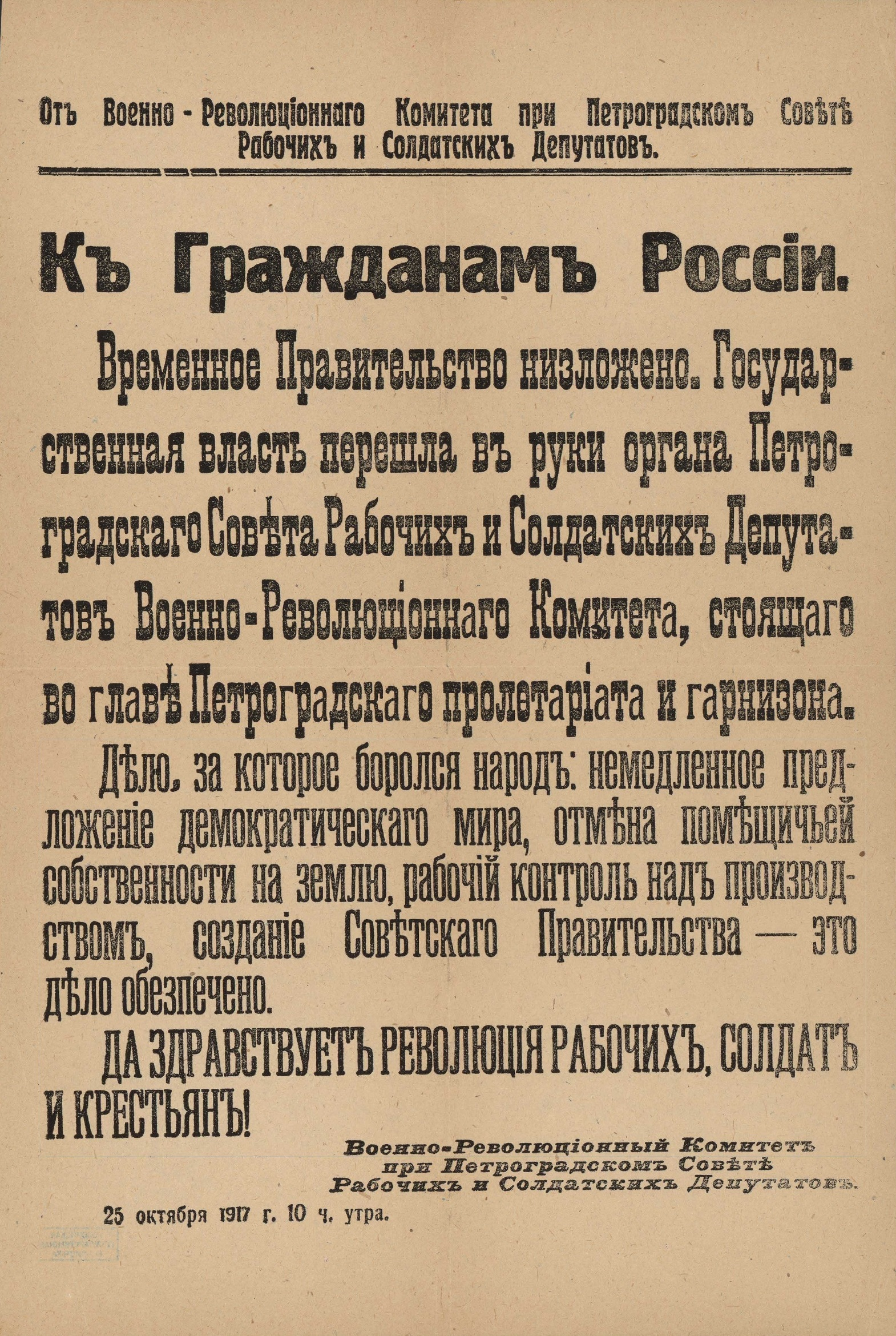
Petrograd Milrevcom proclamation about the deposing of the Russian Provisional Government

The Russian Revolution: A New History is a political history of the Russian Revolution written by Sean McMeekin and published by Basic Books in 2017. The release was timed with the 100th anniversary of the Russian Revolution.

== Synopsis ==
The Russian Revolution explores the period roughly between 1904 – 1921, however it is heavily weighted towards the years immediately leading up to 1917, and the February and October Revolutions. The author provides an overview of early 20th century Russia and factors leading to the Revolution, from the brutal reality of Nicolas II's regime to the aftermath of the Bolshevik revolution and the origins of the Soviet Union in civil war.

The work is divided into four parts of unequal length: background, the period leading up to the 1917 revolution, the revolutionary events of 1917, and a short section on the aftermath; the body is bracketed with a prologue and epilogue where the author's perspective, goals and conclusions are presented. McMeekin focuses on the Bolsheviks, their leadership, and the actions and accidents which led them into power.

McMeekin devotes considerable attention to the three sided relationship between the Tsar, the conscript army, and the Russian people; he explores the weaknesses of the autocracy in the absence of intermediary institutions between them which would normally manage the relationship and temper reactions. This is seen as especially important in the context of popular discontent in Russia regarding World War I and the mutinous state of the Russian army by 1917. A second and complimentary area the author devotes considerable space to is the relationship between Lenin and Germany and the possible ways Germany may have used Lenin and the Bolsheviks to influence the Russian army and people to disrupt the Russian war effort and its relationship with the Entente powers. This gives the work an international perspective, looking beyond national borders and imperial boundaries and fitting the subject into the wider scope of events at the beginning of the twentieth century.

The failed Bolshevik coup during July 1917 and the provisional government's failure to effectively respond to the coup and its leaders is discussed as a key development in the slow motion collapse of the provisional government. McMeekin develops a case that nothing inevitable about the outcome of these years; the Bolshevik revolution, one of the key events in modern history, was carried out by incompetents and was largely the result of chance aided by luck and a hostile foreign power.

== Perspective ==
Writing for the Christian Science Monitor, Terry Hartle writes about McMeekin's focus on individuals, "Historians often debate whether individuals make history or history makes individuals. In the case of the Russian Revolution and the emergence of the Soviet Union, it's clear that what individuals did, or did not do, at crucial times decisively shaped the outcome."

McMeekin’s views about communism are plain to see in the work, and are similar to the viewpoints held by authors such as Richard Pipes and Orlando Figes. Discussing the portrait that emerges of the Bolsheviks and their leaders in the book, Michael Grove writes in their review for the London Times, "The Russian Revolution was the most successful criminal conspiracy in history. The takeover of an entire nation by a shameless huckster supported by a hostile foreign power. And the revolution was also an object lesson in how liberals can lose, and lose catastrophically, from a position of great advantage, if they are divided in the face of a ruthlessly ideological foe."

The author concludes the work with an epilogue, containing a summary of their conclusions and how the events of the Russian Revolution at the beginning of the 20th century speak to events at the beginning of the 21st. McMeekin writes,

"Like the nuclear weapons born of the ideological age inaugurated in 1917, the sad fact about Leninism is that, once invented, it cannot be uninvented. Social inequality will always be with us, along with the well-intentioned impulse of socialists to eradicate it. Fortunately, most social reformers accept limitations on the power of government to direct economic life and tell people what they are permitted to do and say. But the Leninist inclination is always lurking among the ambitious and ruthless, especially in desperate times of depression or war that seem to call for more radical solutions." (Note: Passage quoted from The Russian Revolution: A New History, pp.351.)

"...the popularity of Marxist-style maximalist socialism is on the rise again in the United States and other Western ‘capitalist’ countries". (Note: Passage quoted from The Russian Revolution: A New History, quote pp.352, broader passage pp.347-352, see also pp.219, 274.)

== Reception ==
"Sean McMeekin is a gifted writer with historical talents equal to the challenge of helping the reader to follow the events of the revolution and appreciate their terrible significance. Which is just as well, given how tangled the tale he has to tell."

"... a carefully researched, well-written assessment of the complex and confusing events that did so much to shape the last century. McMeekin is a reliable guide to a complex story and the book moves seamlessly and clearly across a vast landscape of people and events."

"The question remains: Why did this anti-human regime come to control Russia and later dominate the world’s Communist sphere? The author does not give a definite answer, but the book helps the reader think and further investigate the history of the Russian Revolution."

== Release information ==
- Hardcover: 2017 (First Edition), Basic Books, 496pp. ISBN 978-0465039906.
- Paperback: 2021 (First Edition), Basic Books, 496pp. ISBN 978-1541675483.
- Audiobook: 2017, Narrated by Pete Larkin, Hachette Audio, 15 hours and 3 mins.

== About the author ==
Sean McMeekin (born May 10, 1974) is an American historian. His work focuses on European history of the early 20th century, and his main research interests include modern German history, Russian history, communism, and the origins of the First and Second World Wars and the roles of the Russian and Ottoman empires.

== See also ==
- Bibliography of the Russian Revolution and Civil War
- Outline of the Russian Revolution and Civil War
- Index of articles related to the Russian Revolution and Civil War
- Russia in Flames: War, Revolution, Civil War, 1914–1921 (also published in 2017)
- Russia in Revolution: An Empire in Crisis, 1890 to 1928 (also published in 2017)
- A People's Tragedy: The Russian Revolution: 1891-1924
- Russia: Revolution and Civil War, 1917—1921
