= Russia in Revolution =

History of revolutionary Russia, 1890 to 1928

Russia in Revolution: An Empire in Crisis, 1890 to 1928
- Book cover
- Author: S. A. Smith
- Audio read by: Derek Perkins
- Language: English
- Subject: Russian Revolution, Russian Civil War
- Genre: Non-fiction, History
- Published: 2017
- Publisher: Oxford University Press
- Publication place: United Kingdom
- Media type: Hardcover, Paperback, Kindle, Audiobook
- Pages: 448 pp. (hardcover), 16 hours and 17 minutes (audiobook).
- ISBN: 978-0198734826
- Website: Official Page

Russia in Revolution: An Empire in Crisis, 1890 to 1928 is a narrative history of the Russian Revolution, Civil War, and the early history of the Soviet Union, written by S. A. Smith and published in 2017 by Oxford University Press. The release was timed with the 100th anniversary of the Russian Revolution.

== Synopsis ==
The book covers the period from 1890 – 1928, a wider time frame than many works on the Russian Revolution. This reflects the author's intention to understand the Russian Revolution as a long-term process, rather than focus on the narrower events of 1917 as exceptional.

The work addresses many major themes and topics that the revolution grew from, including:

- The process by which the working classes were radicalized.
- The role of empire, transnational influences, and national identities played in the revolution and civil war.
- The process that took the Bolsheviks from being a small faction in Russian socialist politics to the dominant and eventually exclusive ruling party of the former Russian Empire.
- The differences and complex dynamics within and between the different factions and parties aligned with Russian Marxism and European socialism.
- The role violence played in the Bolsheviks assuming and maintaining power.
- How the national experience of World War I and the Civil War shaped the revolution.
- Issues related to religion and apocalyptic thought and how this influenced revolutionary thinking.

The book opens with an introduction which details the author's perspectives and the questions they are seeking to answer. The first chapter provides an overview of the half century preceding the main events of the book until the 1905 Revolution, looking at the reigns of Alexander II and III, and the beginning of Nicolas II's reign and concludes as Stalinism emerges during Stalin's consolidation of power and the end of the New Economic Policy, setting the stage for the era of central planning, collectivization, and industrialization. The structure of the book is both chronological and topical:

- The first chapter is background;
- The second chapter is a social history of Russia on the eve of World War I;
- The third chapter covers the February Revolution, the period of Dual Power, and the October Revolution;
- The fourth chapter is a survey of the civil war;
- Finally, chapters 5 – 7 are a political-social-economic history of War Communism and the New Economic Policy era and the consolidation and expansion of Bolshevik power.

The work concludes with an essay reflecting on the causes and turning points of the Russian Revolution.

There is no formal bibliography, however the extensive notes form a valuable resource on the scholarly writing about the period.

== Reception ==
James D. White writes about Russia in Revolution, "It is a work written mainly for the general reader, though the author hopes that, as a synthesis of recent research by Russian and Western scholars, and as an attempt to question some familiar interpretations, it will have something of interest to say to his academic colleagues. In this, Smith’s hope is entirely justified, because his book not only provides a useful introduction to the subject, but raises important questions of how the revolutionary period in Russia should be interpreted."

Commenting in the English Historical Review on the scholarly but accessible writing, George Gilbert states, "The centenary of the Russian Revolution has, perhaps rather inevitably, invited a wave of new books on the subject, some of them containing much novel material for those engaged at the cutting edge of historical research, with others aimed at a more general readership. S.A. Smith’s contribution to the debate bridges a divide between specialist academic monographs and studies of the Revolution designed to engage a wide audience, with the book "primarily written for the reader coming new to the subject."" (Note: From Russia in Revolution, pp.2)

Academic reviews

- Fedyashin, Anton (2017). "S. A. Smith, Russia in Revolution: An Empire in Crisis, 1890 to 1928". European History Quarterly. 47 (4): 787–789. doi:10.1177/0265691417729639as. S2CID 148995760.
- Gilbert, George (31 December 2018). "Russia in Revolution: An Empire in Crisis, 1890–1928, by S.A. Smith". The English Historical Review. 133 (565): 1642–1643. doi:10.1093/ehr/cey312.
- Legvold, Robert (2017). "Russia in Revolution: An Empire in Crisis, 1890 to 1928 by S. A. Smith; Review by Daniel Orlovsky". Foreign Affairs. 96 (5): 187–188. JSTOR 44821910.
- Orlovsky, Daniel (2017). "Book Review: Russia in Revolution: An Empire in Crisis, 1890 to 1928 by S. A. Smith". Slavic Review. 76 (3): 763–771. doi:10.1017/slr.2017.184. JSTOR 26565182.
- Read, Christopher (3 July 2017). "Historically Inevitable? Turning Points of the Russian Revolution/The Russian Revolution: An Empire in Crisis 1890–1928/The Russian Revolution: 1905–22". Revolutionary Russia. 30 (2): 268–272. doi:10.1080/09546545.2017.1384141. S2CID 149263802.
- Sumpf, Alexandre (2018). "Book Review: Russia in Revolution: An Empire in Crisis, 1890 to 1928". Cahiers du Monde russe. 59 (4): 631–635. doi:10.4000/monderusse.10687. JSTOR 26934366. S2CID 182446891.
- White, James D. (2019). "Book Review: Russia in Revolution". The Slavonic and East European Review. 97 (2): 371–372. doi:10.5699/slaveasteurorev2.97.2.0371. JSTOR 10.5699/slaveasteurorev2.97.2.0371.

== Release information ==
- Hardcover: 2017 (First Edition), Oxford University Press, 448pp. ISBN 978-0198734826.
- Paperback: 2018 (First Edition), Oxford University Press, 480pp. ISBN 978-0198734833.
- Audiobook: 2018, narrated by Derek Perkins, Audible Studios, 16 hours and 17 minutes.

== About the author ==
Stephen Anthony Smith, FBA, FRHistS (born 1952) is a British historian and academic. Since 2012, he has been professor of history at the University of Oxford and a senior research fellow at All Souls College, Oxford. Smith was elected a Fellow of the Royal Historical Society in 1995, and a Fellow of the British Academy, the United Kingdom's national academy, in 2014.

== See also ==
- Bibliography of the Russian Revolution and Civil War
- Index of articles related to the Russian Revolution and Civil War
- Outline of the Russian Revolution and Civil War
- Eastern Front (World War I)
- Soviet grain procurement crisis of 1928
- Russia in Flames: War, Revolution, Civil War, 1914–1921 (also published in 2017)
- The Russian Revolution: A New History (also published in 2017)
- A People's Tragedy: The Russian Revolution: 1891-1924
