= Civil War on the Don =

Part of the Russian Civil War

- Part of the Russian Civil War
- Parade of Student Druzhinas of the White Army. Rostov–on–Don, 1919
Date	November 8, 1917 – March 27, 1920
Location	Don Host Oblast and adjacent territories
Result	Bolshevik victory; Evacuation of the remnants of the White Movement to Crimea

Belligerents
1917–1918: From November 1917: Russia (South–Eastern Union); From January 1918: Russia (Volunteer Army); Until May 1918: Russia (Don Cossack Host); From May 1918: All–Great Don Host; April–November 1918: German Empire; Reichsheer; Austria–Hungary; Ukrainian State; 1919–1920: Armed Forces of South Russia; Rebels of the Vyoshenskaya Uprising (from March to June 1919, then joined the Don Army as part of the Armed Forces of South Russia); British Empire; France	1917–1920: Russian Socialist Federative Soviet Republic; Workers' and Peasants' Red Army; Special Purpose Units; Trotskiy's Irregular Troops; March–September 1918: Don Soviet Republic (until mid–April – Don Republic)

Commanders and leaders
Pyotr Krasnov; Afrikan Bogaevskiy; Svyatoslav Denisov; Pyotr Popov; Aleksey Kaledin †; Pavel Kudinov (Vyoshenskaya uprising); Mikhail Alekseev #; Lavr Kornilov †; Anton Denikin; Pyotr Vrangel; Vladimir May–Maevskiy	Lev Trotskiy (People's Commissar for Military and Naval Affairs); Ioakim Vatsetis (Commander–in–Chief of the Workers' and Peasants' Red Army); Vladimir Ovseenko; Semyon Budyonny; Boris Dumenko

Strength
April–May 1919: Vyoshenskaya uprising: ~30,000 people; 5 divisions; 1 brigade; 2 regiments; As of 1920: White Movement: ~40,000 people; Don Army: ~38,000 people; ~158 guns; ~687 machine guns	Unknown

The Don Civil War was a military action between the Don Cossacks (in alliance with the White movement in Southern Russia) and supporters of Lenin's Council of People's Commissars, primarily in the Don Host Oblast, which took place from November 1917 to the spring of 1920. It was part of the Russian Civil War.

In the Don, as in many other Cossack Oblasts of Russia, there was a historical split between the outlander population and the Cossacks. The fact that the Don became one of the regions where the White Movement began to form its armies is explained primarily by the fact that the Don Oblast received autonomy and self–government at a new level back in the spring of 1917; the Oblast received an elected Ataman and its own governing institutions.

== Don Host Oblast ==
From 1806, the center of the Oblast was the city of Novocherkassk. In 1887, the Taganrog City Administration and Rostov–on–Don Uezd were transferred from the Ekaterinoslav Guberniya to the Oblast.

At the beginning of the 20th century, the Don Oblast included 9 districts:

No.	District	District Center	Area, square verstas	Population, people (1897)
1	Donets	Stanitsa Kamenskaya (12,190 people)	24,659.3	455,819
2	1st Don	Stanitsa Konstantinovskaya (9,267 people)	15,415.9	271,790
3	2nd Don	Stanitsa Nizhne–Chirskaya (6,780 people)	23,219.7	239,055
4	Rostov	Rostov–on–Don (119,476 people)	6,012.0	369,732
5	Sal	Stanitsa Velikoknyazheskaya (5,583 people)	18,961.0	76,297
6	Taganrog	Taganrog (51,437 people)	12,229.4	412,995
7	Ust–Medveditskiy	Stanitsa Ust–Medveditskaya (5,805 people)	18,082.6	246,830
8	Khopyor	Stanitsa Uryupinskaya (11,286 people)	15,861.4	251,498
9	Cherkasskiy	Novocherkassk (51,963 people)	9,750.3	240,222

Gallery

Don Host Oblast

== February – October 1917 ==
The February Revolution of 1917 and the fall of the Russian monarchy marked the end of the sole command of the Don Military Circle and led to a split and polarization of society and government. From the spring of 1917, several structures were formed on the territory of the Don Host Oblast, claiming power:

1. Commissars of the Provisional Government (regional and nine district);
2. Councils of Workers', Soldiers', Peasants' and Cossacks' Deputies;
3. The Don Military Circle (Congress) and its executive bodies: the Military Government and the Don Regional Ataman;
4. Local government bodies: city councils and their executive bodies.

In May 1917, the Regional Congress of Peasants decided to abolish private ownership of land, but the Don Military Circle declared the Don Lands to be "the historical property of the Cossacks" and decided to recall the Cossacks from the apparatus of the Provisional Government and from the Soviets. This led to an intensification of rivalry between the two power structures – the Military Government and the Councils of Workers', Soldiers', Peasants' and Cossacks' Deputies.

At the same time, General Kaledin returned to the Don, having been removed from command of the 8th Army for not accepting the February Revolution and refusing to carry out the orders of the Provisional Government regarding democratization in the troops. At the end of May, Kaledin took part in the work of the Don Military Circle and, yielding to the persuasion of the Cossack Community, agreed to be elected as the Military Ataman.

On September 1, 1917, the Provisional Government's Minister of War, Aleksandr Verkhovskiy, ordered the arrest of Kaledin for involvement in the Kornilov's Uprising, but the Military Government refused to carry out the order, and on September 4, Aleksandr Kerenskiy cancelled it on the condition that the Military Government "guaranteed" Kaledin.

On November 2, 1917, the South–Eastern Union of Cossack Troops, Highlanders of the Kavkaz and Free Peoples of the Steppes was established in Vladikavkaz as a state–territorial unit governed on the principles of a confederation. The stated goal of the South–Eastern Union was the fight against "anarcho–Bolshevism" on the territory of the Cossack Troops – members of the Union, mutual support for maintaining order and legality within the Union and bringing Russia to the Constituent Assembly. In its declaration, it proclaimed: "By guaranteeing its members complete independence of their internal life, the Union undertakes to assist them in preparing their internal structure as independent states of the future Russian Democratic Federal Republic". After the proclamation of Soviet Power on the Don, Kuban, and Terek (January–March 1918), the South–Eastern Union ceased to exist.

== November – December 1917 ==
=== Socio–political situation ===
In the first months after the October Revolution, the anti–Bolshevik forces did not have significant social support, so their attempts to organize resistance to Soviet Power in the Cossack Regions were comparatively weak.

The situation on the Don during this period was extremely contradictory. The main cities were dominated by an "outsiders" population, alien to the indigenous population of the Don both in their composition, lifestyle, and political sentiments. Here, especially in Rostov and Taganrog, socialist parties dominated, distrusting the Cossack authorities. The Mensheviks were numerically dominant in all the councils of the Don Oblast, the central bureaus of trade unions and in many Soviets, and even if they gave way to the Socialist Revolutionaries somewhere, they still occupied leadership positions. The working population of the Taganrog District supported the Bolsheviks. In the northern part of the Taganrog District there were coal mines and pits of the southern protrusion of the Donets Basin. Rostov became the center of protest by outlanders against "Cossack dominance". Local Bolshevik leaders could count on the support of soldiers from the reserve regiment stationed in the city. The Don moderate Social Democrats, as well as those in the center, were not united in their assessment of the Petrograd Uprising and its consequences. The Chairman of the Novocherkassk Menshevik Committee, Aleksandr Samokhin, expressing the general opinion of the Don Menshevik Defenders, said that he considered it impossible to participate in the Soviets that had taken a hostile position towards the Constituent Assembly. At the same time, the Bolsheviks of the Rostov–Nakhichevan Council of Workers' and Soldiers' Deputies created the Military Revolutionary Committee.

The city councils of the oblast, in which the Mensheviks had taken strong positions, launched anti–Bolshevik propaganda. The resolution adopted by the Novocherkassk Duma on the proposal of the socialist bloc indicated that the Bolshevik Action on the eve of the convocation of the Constituent Assembly was an attempt to replace the voice of the entire people with the voice of individual groups, a betrayal of the cause of democracy. At an emergency meeting of the Nakhichevan Duma, the Council and the city's trade unions on November 9, the Petrograd Uprising was assessed as "a form of political adventurism", expressing concern that, under the banner of the fight against the Bolsheviks, opponents of democracy would undoubtedly become more active. The leaders of the local Mensheviks – the Chairman of the Rostov Duma Boris Vasilev, who in the pre–October period had in practice implemented the idea of an agreement with the Kaledin Government, and Pyotr Petrenko, the Chairman of the Rostov–Nakhichevan Council of Workers' and Soldiers' Deputies and at the same time the Chairman of the Public Committee (which united the Rostov–Nakhichevan Council of Workers' and Soldiers' Deputies and the bourgeois Civil Committee) – in the October Days of 1917 considered the possibility of joint actions with the Military Government against the establishment of the Bolshevik Regime. At the same time, both understood that following the defeat of the Bolshevik organizations, the same fate could await the Menshevik organizations. At the same time, moderate Social Democrats did not want to support Soviet Power, since they continued to consider the transition to socialism in Russia premature. Therefore, the Mensheviks called on their organizations to play the role of a "third force" to which both Bolshevism and the Constitutional Democratic – Kaledin Dictatorship were alien. They considered the expression of such a "third force" to be "a national regional governing body, which would include representatives of the entire population of the Don". In other words, the Mensheviks sought to resolve the confrontation between the Ataman Government and the Bolsheviks by peaceful means, addressing appeals to the population and, first and foremost, to the Military Ataman. At the same time, the idea of an agreement with the Military Government was not popular among the left wing of the Menshevik Party – the Menshevik Internationalists, who considered it necessary to simultaneously participate in both the Bolshevik Soviets and the committees for the defense of the Constituent Assembly, not trusting the authority of the Circle, and some even demanded unification with the Bolsheviks to fight Kaledin.

=== Actions of the Military Government ===
On November 7, 1917, Ataman Aleksey Kaledin issued the following appeal: "In view of the Bolsheviks' actions to attempt to overthrow the Provisional Government... the Military Government, considering such a seizure of power by the Bolsheviks to be criminal,... will provide... full support... to the Provisional Government... The Military Government has temporarily, until the restoration of the Provisional Government's authority and order in Russia,... assumed full executive state power in the Don Oblast".

On November 8, while in Rostov the Council attempted to take power into its own hands, Kaledin from Novocherkassk introduced martial law in the coal mining region of the oblast, sending Cossacks there, and established contacts with the Cossack Leadership of Orenburg, Kuban, Astrakhan, and Terek.

On November 9, Kaledin telegraphed an invitation to the Provisional Government and members of the Provisional Council of the Russian Republic to Novocherkassk to organize the fight against the Bolsheviks.

On November 10, the Military Government liquidated the Makeevka Council, a number of mine Councils, and arrested delegates, among whom were not only Bolsheviks, but also Mensheviks. On November 13, delegates from the Don were arrested while returning from the Second Congress of Soviets.

On November 15, Kaledin issued an order to introduce martial law throughout the Don Oblast. Military units were stationed in all industrial centres. General Nazarov and his Cossack Company settled in Taganrog, and General Pototskiy in Rostov. The Soviets were liquidated, workers' organizations were closed, their activists were fired from their jobs and, together with their families, were expelled outside the oblast. Delegations of Donets Miners sought protection in Petrograd and Kiev. The politicians of the Central Rada, who considered the Don Government as a potential partner in the future federation, tried to reason with it through negotiations and persuasion, which did not help much. The epicenter of tension was the largest city in the oblast, Rostov.

At the conference of the Don Committee of the Russian Social Democratic Labor Party held on November 16, chaired by the Menshevik Zavarzin, it was noted that the introduction of martial law by the authorities of the Military Circle could, in the current situation, lead to the emergence of hotbeds of civil strife in the south of Russia. At the same time, the delegates agreed with Boris Vasilev that the party "must with all determination distance itself from any ideological closeness with Bolshevism and recognize only technical agreements with them".

=== Beginning of the activities of the Alekseevskaya Organization ===
On November 15, General Mikhail Alekseev arrived in Novocherkassk from Petrograd and immediately turned to Kaledin for help in creating volunteer formations to fight the Bolsheviks. Kaledin, however, refused his request to "give shelter to the Russian officers", citing the fact that the Cossack front–line soldiers were tired of the war and hated the "old regime", and therefore the Don Regiments returning from the front did not want to defend the Don Oblast from the Bolsheviks and were going home. Kaledin asked Alekseev "not to stay in Novocherkassk for more than a week" and to move the formation of volunteer forces outside the oblast. Despite the cold reception, Alekseev immediately began to take practical steps. Already on November 15, he published an appeal to officers, calling on them to "save the Motherland".

=== Neutrality of the Cossacks in relation to the Soviet Power ===
The Military Ataman was unable to rouse the front–line Cossacks to fight against the Bolshevik Government: the Cossack Units, returning from the front, went home, since the Cossacks, tired of the war, did not want to fight the Bolsheviks, who had stopped military operations against Germany and sent the army home. Many regiments surrendered their weapons without resistance at the demand of small Red Detachments that stood as barriers on the railway tracks leading to the Don Oblast.

The First Decrees of the Soviet Government inclined the bulk of the Cossacks to the side of the Soviets. The idea of "neutrality" in relation to Soviet Power became widespread among the Cossack front–line soldiers. The Bolsheviks, for their part, sought to take full advantage of this wavering mood of the ordinary Cossacks, to set their poorest part (the so–called "laboring Cossacks") against the wealthy, and to instill the idea that the Military Government was composed of "class enemies".

Meanwhile, the Military Government itself was torn apart by inter–party contradictions, and the outlander peasantry was not satisfied with the concessions made to it (broad admission to the Cossacks, participation in stanitsa self–government, transfer of part of the landowners' lands), demanding radical land reform.

On November 20, Ataman Kaledin, having stopped trying to contact the remnants of the deposed Provisional Government, addressed the population of the Oblast with a statement that the Military Government did not recognize the Bolshevik Government, and therefore the Oblast was proclaimed independent until the formation of a legitimate Russian Government.

On November 14, 1917, an infantry section headed by the Left Socialist Revolutionary, Poruchik Arnautov, moved from Novocherkassk to Rostov, which informed the Military Government that from that moment on it would be called the Military Committee of the Non–Cossack Units of the Don Oblast and would assume responsibility for managing these units. The Military Committee demanded that the Military Government immediately lift martial law in non–Cossack districts, as well as release those arrested for political agitation, and convene a general congress of peasants, workers, and Cossacks to resolve the issue of regional self–government. Arnautov recognized the authority of the Council of People's Commissars and appealed to all regimental committees and commanders of non–Cossack units located in the Don Oblast (in Rostov, Taganrog, Novocherkassk, Azov and Kamenskaya) with an appeal not to carry out the orders of the Military Ataman and his staff.

=== Elections to the Constituent Assembly ===
Until mid–November, local Bolsheviks did not dare to take up arms, concentrating their attention on organizing revolutionary and democratic forces around the Military Revolutionary Committee in anticipation of the elections to the Constituent Assembly. The Military Government also awaited the election results to assess the balance of political forces in the region and begin creating representative authorities in the oblast.

Elections to the Constituent Assembly in the Don Oblast took place on November 25–27. Having received their preliminary results, Kaledin convened an emergency meeting of the Military Government on November 27 with the participation of public figures, where he admitted: "We did not think that the Bolshevik Movement would find support among the population and grow to such proportions". The representatives of the Menshevik Party present at the meeting, together with the right–wing Socialist Revolutionaries, proposed concluding an agreement with the Military Government, which should lift martial law in the oblast and organize power on a representative basis for the entire population of the oblast, and not just the Cossacks. However, Kaledin insisted on non–recognition of the Council of People's Commissars and on the need to restore the coalition government in Russia. An agreement between the moderate socialists and the Military Government was thus not reached.

=== Uprising against Kaledin ===
Seeing the authorities' lack of desire to compromise, some Mensheviks decided to enter into a temporary alliance with the Bolsheviks. The idea of creating a broad front of forces to fight Kaledin was also considered by the Don Bolsheviks, with some of them believing that military action should be immediately launched and an offensive launched against Novocherkassk, while others were against forcing the issue.

On November 28, a meeting of representatives of the Military Revolutionary Committee, the Regional Military Committee, and the Executive Committee of the Council of Workers' and Soldiers' Deputies was held, at which an organizational structure was created – the Military Revolutionary Committee of United Democracy, which called itself the Government of United Democratic Forces and proposed that the population not comply with the orders of the Military Government. The Mensheviks insisted on a peaceful resolution of the conflict and intended to enter into negotiations with the representative of the Military Government, General Pototskiy. However, as it became known from Novocherkassk, on December 3, the Cossack Hundred, by order of the Military Government, forcibly disarmed the soldiers of the 272nd and 273rd Reserve Infantry Regiments. On December 7, ships of the Black Sea Fleet arrived in Rostov–on–Don, sent here to assist the Bolsheviks by decision of the All–Black Sea Congress. The flotilla, consisting of the destroyer Captain Saken, two minesweepers, several small vessels, and a landing detachment of sailors, was commanded by a "commission of five" elected by the All–Black Sea Congress, headed by the Bolshevik sailor Vladimir Drachuk. The Menshevik leaders assessed the arrival of the flotilla as proof that the Bolsheviks were able to resort to military action.

The Don Government regarded the intervention of the Black Sea Fleet as a violation of its sovereignty and, through the Revolutionary Headquarters, lodged a protest with the Council of People's Commissars. The Commissar of the Cossack Troops at Headquarters, Shapkin, handed Krylenko a document stating that "on November 22, several armed trawlers, sent by the Black Sea Fleet against the Don Military Government, entered the Taganrog Port... another detachment headed for Rostov... Moreover, news is coming from a wide variety of sources that troops are being gathered from the north against the Don... in order to establish the dominance of the principles of the Social Democrats and the Bolsheviks on the Don".

Sailor Vasiliy Romenets, elected by the Central Committee of the Black Sea Fleet as the "Chief People's Commissar of the Black Sea Fleet", informed the Council of People's Commissars of his election only on December 6, and in the following days reported on the "excitement against Kaledin's adventure" that had risen in the fleet and that local "higher democratic organizations had taken some measures, purely demonstrative. At the present time, another flotilla is being sent to the Sea of Azov, but a clash is already anticipated... I ask you to inform... comrades, what has been done in this regard on your part, as well as how to act and what the Black Sea Fleet should undertake in the future, because passions are flaring up... I have no orders from you. Perhaps we... are mistaken, although we think we are not". People's Commissar Trotskiy demanded that Supreme Commander–in–Chief Krylenko "not enter into any negotiations with the counterrevolutionary conspirators... put an end to the criminal actions of the Kaledinites and Kornilovites with one blow... and the counterrevolutionary rebellion of Dutov". He proposed to Krylenko "to immediately move in the direction of Moskva, Rostov–on–Don and Orenburg such forces that, without shaking our front, would be powerful enough to wipe off the face of the earth in the shortest possible time the counter–revolutionary rebellion of the Cossack generals and the Constitutional Democratic bourgeoisie" and instructed him to "ask the Ukrainian Rada whether it considers itself obliged to provide assistance in the fight against Kaledin or whether it intends to regard the advance of our echelons to the Don as a violation of its territorial rights". The Council of People's Commissars issued an order to the Chief Commissar of the Black Sea Fleet on December 9: "Act with all decisiveness against the enemies of the people, without waiting for any instructions from above. Kaledin, Kornilov, Dutov are outside the law... Respond to the ultimatum with the strongest, boldest revolutionary action".

On December 7, at a meeting of the Military Revolutionary Committee, the Bolsheviks proposed presenting Kaledin with a 24-hour ultimatum: to lift martial law in the Don Oblast and for the Military Government to renounce its claims to power. After this decision was made, on the evening of December 8, the Socialist Revolutionary – Menshevik Center announced its withdrawal from the Military Revolutionary Committee. The Left Socialist Revolutionaries continued to work under the leadership of the Bolsheviks.

Meanwhile, on the night of December 8–9, 1917, a detachment of Cossacks and yunkers destroyed the premises of the Rostov–Nakhichevan Council, killing several Red Guards.

On December 9, the Rostov Bolsheviks announced that power in the Oblast was passing into the hands of the Rostov Military Revolutionary Committee. Attempts by Duma Delegations to the Bolshevik Military Revolutionary Committee and the Military Government to prevent civil war ended in failure, although on December 10 it was decided to send Duma Delegations to the Bolshevik Military Revolutionary Committee and the Military Government. However, General Pototskiy took an evasive position, and the Bolsheviks declared that negotiations were out of the question, since Kaledin demanded the disarmament of the Red Guard and the return of the Black Sea Flotilla to its permanent base. As a result, on December 11, the Rostov Duma decided to maintain neutrality.

The Cossack Units, however, refused to participate in suppressing the uprising, and Ataman Kaledin was forced to turn to General Mikhail Alekseev for help. A detachment of officers and yunkers of 400–500 bayonets was urgently formed, they were joined by Don Youth – gymnasium students, kadets, and later several Cossack Units arrived. Fierce fighting took place in the Nakhichevan Region; the city changed hands several times until it was finally captured by revolutionary troops on the night of December 11. The yunkers retreated to Novocherkassk. On the morning of December 11, the Kaledinites were driven out of Rostov Station. However, Kaledin, not reconciled to defeat, brought reinforcements to Rostov–on–Don. For three days, the Red Guards and Black Sea Fleet Sailors fought heavy battles with superior White Forces, experiencing an acute shortage of men and ammunition. On December 15, the revolutionary units, left without ammunition, retreated from Rostov–on–Don. Kaledin's Forces also captured Taganrog and a significant part of the Donets Basin. From that day on, the Alekseevskaya Organization won the right to legal existence.

=== Arrival of Kornilov. Creation of the "triumvirate" ===
On December 19, General Lavr Kornilov arrived on the Don and immediately joined General Alekseev's activities.

On December 31, Kaledin, Alekseev and Kornilov entered the so–called "triumvirate", which stood at the head of the Don Civil Council, created to lead the White movement throughout the territory of the former Russian Empire and claiming the role of an all–Russian government. The Entente Countries contacted it, sending their representatives to Novocherkassk.

On January 2, 1918, by order No. 1058 of Ataman Kaledin, the formation of volunteer detachments in the territory of the Don Oblast was permitted. The creation of the "Volunteer Army" and the opening of enrollment into it were officially announced on January 6, 1918.

However, the "neutrality" of the Cossacks prevented Alekseev and Kornilov from forming a truly large army of volunteers on the Don. The Volunteer Army was perceived by the Cossacks as a not entirely democratic institution, encroaching on their Cossack liberties, an instrument of big politics, which they did not care about. The Cossacks, observing the serious military preparations of the Soviet Government in the southern direction, believed that they were directed only against "uninvited aliens" – volunteers. This view was not alien to the Provisional Don Government itself, which hoped to reconcile the Soviet Government with the Don and save the oblast from the Bolshevik invasion by collusion with local revolutionary institutions and loyalty to the Soviet Government. As a result, only about 5 thousand officers, yunkers and high school students joined the Volunteer Army. Unable to hold on to the Don, the Volunteer Army set out on a campaign to Kuban in February 1918, counting on the support of the Kuban Cossacks, but these expectations also did not come true: the Kuban Cossacks, like the Don Cossacks, did not want to fight against the new government. The volunteers, who found themselves in a hostile environment of the local peasant population and revolutionary–minded units of the old army that had returned from the front, had to wage a difficult guerrilla war for survival in Kuban.

Gallery

Memorial plaque at the former headquarters of the Volunteer Army in Rostov–on–Don

=== Beginning of the actions of Soviet troops against Kaledin ===
In December 1917, the Government of Soviet Russia considered the Don Government of Ataman Kaledin and the Ukrainian Central Rada to be the main strongholds of counter–revolutionary forces.

On December 9, 1917, the Council of People's Commissars of the Russian Socialist Federative Soviet Republic issued an appeal to the entire population "On the Fight Against the Counter–Revolutionary Uprising of Kaledin, Kornilov, and Dutov, Supported by the Central Rada":

While the representatives of the soviets of workers', soldiers', and peasants' deputies opened negotiations with the aim of securing a dignified peace for the exhausted country, the enemies of the people – imperialists, pomeshchiks, bankers, and their allies – the Cossack generals – made a last desperate attempt to disrupt the cause of peace, to wrest power from the hands of the soviets, the land from the hands of the peasants, and to force soldiers, sailors, and Cossacks to bleed for the profits of the Russian and allied imperialists. Kaledin on the Don, Dutov in the Ural raised the banner of rebellion... Kaledin introduced martial law in the Don Region, is preventing the delivery of grain to the front, and is gathering forces, threatening Ekaterinoslav, Kharkov, and Moskva. Kornilov, the very one who introduced the death penalty in July and marched on revolutionary Petrograd, came to his aid after escaping from imprisonment...
Workers, soldiers, peasants! ... The Council of People's Commissars has ordered the deployment of the necessary troops against the enemies of the people. The counter–revolutionary uprising will be suppressed, and the perpetrators will be punished in accordance with the gravity of their crime.
The Council of People's Commissars decided:
All those regions in the Ural, the Don, and in other places where counter–revolutionary detachments are found are declared to be under a state of siege.
The local revolutionary garrison is obliged to act with all decisiveness against the enemies of the people, without waiting for any instructions from above.
Any negotiations with the leaders of the counter–revolutionary uprising or attempts at mediation are absolutely prohibited.
Any assistance to the counter–revolutionaries by the rebellious population or by railway personnel will be punished to the full extent of the revolutionary laws.
The leaders of the conspiracy are declared to be outlaws.

On December 19, the Council of People's Commissars of the Russian Socialist Federative Soviet Republic formed the Southern Revolutionary Front to Fight Counterrevolution. Vladimir Ovseenko was appointed Commander–in–Chief of the front's troops. The Revolutionary Field Headquarters was under his direct command.

The immediate task of the Soviet troops was to cut off Ukraina from the Don and encircle the Don Oblast from several sides. Initially, the total number of forces sent to Ukraina and the Don amounted to no more than 6–7 thousand bayonets and sabres with 30–40 guns and several dozen machine guns – these were mainly units of the old army that had retained their combat capability, allocated from the front and from rear reserve regiments. As they advanced, they were reinforced by local units of the Red Guard of the Donets Basin and the addition of Bolshevik–minded local garrisons.

On December 21, trains carrying Red detachments under the command of Rudolf Sivers and the sailor Nikolay Khovrin arrived in Kharkov – 1,600 men with 6 guns and 3 armored cars. This was the same detachment that had participated in the battles near Belgorod against the shock battalions breaking through from Headquarters to the Don. Between December 24 and 29, up to five thousand more soldiers arrived from Petrograd, Moscow, and Tver, led by Commander Ovseenko and his deputy, Chief of Staff Mikhail Muravyov, a former Lieutenant Colonel of the Russian Army. In addition, three thousand Red Guards and pro–Bolshevik soldiers of the old army were already in Kharkov.

On December 24–25, the 1st All–Ukrainian Congress of Soviets took place in the city, which proclaimed Ukraina a Republic of Soviets.

After the congress, Ovseenko handed over command of the front troops in Ukraina to the Front Chief of Staff, Muravyov, and he himself led the fight against the Kaledinites.

Kaledin's main forces (although most of the Kazaks had gone home) were grouped in the Voronezh Direction, in the Kamenskaya–Glubokaya–Millerovo–Likhaya Area. In the Taganrog Direction, Kutepov's Detachment from the Volunteer Armiya, which was being formed in Novocherkassk and Rostov–on–Don and by that time numbered up to 2 thousand fighters, held the defense. Small partisan detachments of Don Volunteers (for example, the Detachment of Chernetsov, the Commandant of the Makeevka Mines) and several regular Cossack units occupied the Gorlovka–Makeevka Region of the Donets Basin, from where they had previously driven out Red Guard detachments. The internal state of Kaledin's units, however, excluded the possibility of wide–scale active operations.

By January 7, 1918, Antonov-Ovseyenko had occupied the western part of the Donets Basin almost without resistance. From there, he intended to destroy Kaledin's main forces on the Voronezh axis using columns under Sivers and Sablin. Simultaneously, a column formed in Voronezh under Petrov was to advance on Millerovo from the direction of Voronezh; its forward units had already reached Chertkovo station by this time.

Meanwhile, Cossack detachments under Chernetsov, Lazarev, and Semiletov continued operating in the eastern Donbas.

On December 29, Kaledin's forces crushed the Yasinovka and Bokovo-Khrustalnaya mine Soviets. Fierce fighting erupted in the area of Yuzovka and neighboring Makeevka. On January 1, Cossacks broke into the Brestovo-Bogodukhovsky mine. On January 4, Rudolf Sivers' column entered the Donbas, linking up with mine partisans. On the night of January 3–4, Red Guards launched an offensive from Yuzovka. Fighting spread across the Yuzovka, Khanzhenkovo, Makeevka, Mospino, and Ilovaisk areas. A fierce battle at the Prokhorovka mine between Yuzovka and Makeevka lasted nearly a day and ended in a Red Guard victory.

The advance of Soviet forces was slow due to enemy resistance and the peculiarities of the early Civil War period: combat clashes alternated with negotiations and unauthorized truces between units on both sides. As a result, Sivers' column became the only active force, but it also deviated significantly southward from its intended direction, while disintegration began among its units drawn from the old army. The enemy, taking advantage of this and gathering small combat-ready reserves, pushed back both of Antonov-Ovseyenko's columns with short strikes. On January 9, after heavy losses, Sivers' troops abandoned part of the Yuzovka-Makeevka district and retreated to Nikitovka. The situation near Lugansk also became unfavorable. On the night of January 10, Cossacks seized Debaltsevo. On January 11–13, Chernetsov's detachment occupied the Yasinovka commune in Makeevka, carrying out Kaledin's order to "wipe the Yasinovka mine and its adjacent workers' settlements off the face of the Donetsk region." The punitive detachment executed 61 workers here.

Miners' detachments from Yuzovka, Makeevka, Yenakievo, and a group of troops under Sivers came to the mine's aid. The Yasinovka mine was retaken. In early January, Sivers' forces—now reinforced by 4,000 Donbas Red Guards—launched an offensive through Ilovaisk and Taganrog toward Rostov. A group under Sablin, also bolstered by local Red Guards, began advancing on Rostov from the Lugansk area via Zverevo–Kamenskaya–Novocherkassk. On January 25, Soviet troops occupied Makeevka.

Meanwhile, the majority of Don Cossacks showed no desire to fight. Active propaganda efforts were directed at them, involving members of the Don Revolutionary Committee.

On January 23, 1918, a Congress of Frontline Cossacks was convened in Kamenskaya, declaring itself the authority in the Don region, deposing Ataman Kaledin, and electing a Cossack Military Revolutionary Committee headed by Junior sergeant F. G. Podtyolkov and 24-year-old Ensign M. V. Krivoshlykov. The congress recognized the authority of the Council of People's Commissars.

The new revolutionary committee primarily reflected the sentiments of middle-class Cossacks; it failed to coordinate with non-Cossack peasants and workers, who could have provided real support, and even reacted negatively to their military organization. Meanwhile, Don units had disintegrated to such an extent that they refused to fight for either side. Thus, Kaledin managed to achieve local success again with his mobile detachments, expelling the Don Revolutionary Committee from the Don region on January 28, 1918.

The completely demoralized Don units were replaced on the front by Volunteer Army forces. This measure allowed the defenders to halt the advance of Sivers' and Sablin's columns. However, at this time, an uprising broke out in Taganrog, in the rear of the White forces, and both Red columns were reinforced by new waves of reinforcements from Ukraine and the center. On February 3, 1918, Sivers' column resumed its advance and, by February 8, 1918, linked up with the Taganrog rebels. The Whites' situation worsened, and they retreated toward Rostov daily: Cossack trains attempting to reach the Don from the World War front were disarmed en route. However, a real threat loomed from the Caucasus: a headquarters for the "Southeastern" army, formed in Tsaritsyn, was concentrating the 39th Infantry Division of the old army from the Caucasian Front near Tikhoretsk to cut off the Don's communications with the Kuban by seizing Bataysk.

On February 10, 1918, Red detachments occupied Taganrog and began advancing on Rostov. White resistance on the approaches to Novocherkassk and Rostov was finally broken, but Sivers' and Sablin's columns advanced slowly, capturing these cities only on February 23, 1918 (Rostov) and February 25, 1918 (Novocherkassk), while Bataysk had already been taken by units of the 39th Infantry Division on February 13, 1918.

The outnumbered Volunteer Army detachments could no longer hold back the Red advance, and on February 10, 1918, General Kornilov informed Kaledin that the Volunteers were leaving for the Kuban.

The decision of Alekseyev and Kornilov to lead the Volunteer Army to the Kuban stripped Kaledin of his last hope. Having lost the support of frontline Cossacks and seeing no way to stop the Bolshevik detachments, on February 11, 1918, Ataman A. M. Kaledin resigned as Don Ataman and shot himself the same day (according to other sources, he was killed in a third assassination attempt).

== First successes of the Soviets ==
At the beginning of 1918, the troops of the Council of People's Commissars, thanks to the support of the population, overwhelming numerical superiority and good supplies of ammunition from the warehouses of the old army, managed to suppress the centers of anti–Bolshevik resistance, in particular, to establish Soviet Power on the Don and Kuban. The elimination of the first pockets of resistance, however, was not completed due to the weakness of Soviet Power and the low combat capability of Soviet Troops. The Volunteer Army retreated and retained its core officer cadres.

The development of events on the Don (lack of support from the Cossacks, constantly increasing pressure from the superior forces of the Reds, the defeat of the most combat–ready Cossack Detachment of Colonel Chernetsov and the death of its commander, and then the suicide of Ataman Kaledin) forced the Volunteer Army to leave the Don and move to the Kuban Region to create a base there for further struggle against the Bolsheviks. On February 22, 1918, General Kornilov, at the head of the Volunteer Army, set out on the First Kuban Campaign.

On February 25, a detachment of Red Cossacks led by Military Elder Nikolay Golubov occupied Novocherkassk, where a meeting of the Military Circle was taking place at that time. Golubov tore off the general's epaulettes from the Military Ataman Anatoliy Nazarov and arrested him, and ordered the deputies to "get the hell out", after which all the delegates of the Circle were arrested, and Soviet Power was proclaimed in the city. The next day, emergency commissioners arrived in the city with detachments of the Red Guard and began beating up the city's intelligentsiya and officers. The Cossacks did not expect such a turn of events and began to resist. In response to this opposition, on February 17, Ataman Anatoliy Nazarov and 6 other officers were shot.

On February 25, a volunteer detachment led by the Campaign Ataman of the Don Host, Major general Pyotr Popov (Chief of Staff – Colonel Vladimir Sidorin), numbering 1,727 combat personnel, leaves Novocherkassk for the Sal Steppes (see Steppe Campaign). This campaign marked the beginning of the armed struggle of the Don Cossacks against the Red Army.

Before dawn on March 19, 1918, in the stanitsa Denisovskaya, in the house of a Kalmyk gelyun (priest), Nikolay Golubov arrested the Deputy Ataman Mitrofan Bogaevskiy. He brought him to Novocherkassk and placed him in the guardhouse.

On March 23, the Don Regional Military Revolutionary Committee proclaimed on the territory of the Don Host Oblast an "independent Don Soviet Republic in blood union with the Russian Soviet Republic" (official name – Don Republic). The Head of the Don Republic was the Cossack Ensign Fyodor Podtyolkov, who took the post of Chairman of the Council of People's Commissars, as well as the post of Military Commissar of the Republic.

The First Congress of the Soviets of Workers' and Cossacks' Deputies of the Don Republic, held from April 22 to 27 in Rostov, declares itself the supreme authority of the Don Soviet Republic, confirms the powers of all previously elected Commissars and members of the Central Executive Committee of the Soviets of the Don Republic. The Don Republic was renamed the Don Soviet Republic.

Soviet Power lasted in Rostov–on–Don from February 23 to May 3, 1918.

Already from the end of March, Cossack uprisings broke out in a number of Don stanitsas, provoked by attempts at land redistribution, and in many places by shootings and robberies by Red Guard units. After several weeks of fighting, the rebel Cossacks finally overthrew Soviet Power in Novocherkassk and announced the creation of the All–Great Don Host. In April, the creation of the Don Army began on the basis of rebel units and the detachment of General Pyotr Popov, who had returned from the Steppe Campaign.

On May 4, 1918, the Bolsheviks retreated from Rostov, having removed all Don Banknotes from the State Bank vaults on the night of May 1, 1918.

By the beginning of May, the western part of the Don Host Oblast, including Rostov, Nakhichevan–on–Don, Taganrog, Millerovo, and Chertkovo, was occupied by the German Expeditionary Force, which entered the territory of neighboring Ukraina in March in accordance with the agreement signed by the Ukrainian Rada with Germany and Austria–Hungary. The leadership of the Don Soviet Republic, evacuated to Tsaritsyn, subsequently moved to the stanitsa Velikoknyazheskaya and continued their activities there until the end of June.

On May 16, in Novocherkassk, General Pyotr Krasnov was elected Ataman of the All–Great Don Host, relying on an alliance with Germany in his fight against the Bolsheviks.

== Cossacks' rebellion against Soviet Power ==
Discontent was brewing among the Cossacks over the beginning of the redistribution of land on the Don, and the fact that outlander peasants, who had previously rented land from the Cossacks, were beginning to occupy and cultivate Cossack allotments in the yurts of Cossack stanitsas. Contradictions in the countryside grew and led to numerous Cossacks' rebellions against the new government. The situation was aggravated by the entry of German Troops into the region: German Cavalry occupied the entire western part of the Donets District, German Garrisons were located in the stanitsas of Kamenskaya and Ust–Belokalitvenskaya, in Millerovo, Bataysk, the Germans occupied Taganrog and the Taganrog District and found themselves 12 kilometers from Novocherkassk.

The turn of the Cossacks against the Bolsheviks allowed the White Movement to gain social support and an economic base in the Don. Having risen to armed struggle against Soviet Power, the Don Cossacks restored the Ataman's Power in May. General Pyotr Krasnov, elected as the Military Ataman, began to form the Don Army from Cossack Detachments, using the assistance of German Troops and establishing an exchange of grain with them for weapons and ammunition.

On May 4, 1918, the last Bolsheviks evacuated from Rostov to the Kuban Region. The next day, the Drozdovites entered the city, but were driven out by the Red Units. Having received a message from the Cossacks, they went towards Novocherkassk and helped the Cossack Detachments drive the Reds out of the capital of the Don Cossacks. They refused to stay with the Cossacks and went south to join the Volunteer Army.

On May 8, Krasnov's Cossacks (Turoverov's Cavalry) and German Units (the 20th Reserve Division, which remained in the city until December 1918) occupy Rostov. The Don Soviet Republic ceased to exist.

== Cossack rule of Krasnov ==
On May 9, the Provisional Don Government announced the convening of the Circle of Salvation of the Don on May 11.

On May 10, Cossack Detachments occupy Novocherkassk.

On May 11, delegates from stanitsas and military units gathered in Novocherkassk and established the Circle of Salvation of the Don, at which, on May 16, Major General Pyotr Krasnov was elected as the Military Ataman, who addressed a letter to Emperor Wilhelm proposing cooperation and requesting a protectorate.

On May 18, the Circle of Salvation of the Don proclaimed the creation of an independent state of the All–Great Don Host, headed by Ataman Krasnov, on the territory of the Don Host Oblast.

As General Krasnov noted, "It's easy for Denikin, of course, to accuse me of supporting the Germans, but Denikin takes weapons from me, even though I buy them from the Germans for bread from the warehouses of the Southwestern Front of the former Russian Army".

The fate of the Cossacks was finally decided by the secret directive of the Organizational Bureau of the Central Committee of the Russian Communist Party (Bolsheviks), dated January 24, 1919, and by the subsequent actions of the Bolsheviks to implement it. The directive declared outlanders (that is, non–Cossacks) to be the mainstay of Soviet Power in the Cossack Lands, and also provided a program of harsh repressive measures for De-Cossackization:

January 24, 1919.
Circular. Confidential.
Recent events on various fronts in the Cossack Regions – our advances deep into Cossack Settlements and the disintegration of the Cossack Troops – compel us to issue instructions to party workers concerning the nature of their work in re–establishing and strengthening Soviet Power in the aforementioned regions. Taking into account the experience of the civil war with the Cossacks, it is necessary to recognize that the only correct course of action is a most merciless struggle against all the upper echelons of the Cossacks, aimed at their total extermination. No compromises, no half measures are acceptable. Therefore, it is necessary:

1. to conduct mass terror against the wealthy Cossacks, exterminating them completely; to conduct merciless mass terror against all Cossacks who took any direct or indirect part in the struggle against Soviet Power. With regard to the middle Cossacks, it is necessary to take all measures that will guarantee against any attempts on their part to stage new uprisings against Soviet Power.
2. to confiscate grain and require that all surplus be delivered to designated collection points; this applies both to grain and to all other agricultural products.
3. to take all measures to assist the displaced poor by organizing resettlement wherever possible.
4. to equalize the outlander newcomers with the Cossacks in terms of land and in all other respects.
5. to carry out complete disarmament, executing anyone found in possession of a weapon after the surrender deadline.
6. to issue weapons only to reliable elements among the outlanders.
7. to leave armed detachments in Cossack stanitsas until complete order is established.
8. All Commissars appointed to various Cossack settlements are requested to demonstrate maximum firmness and to strictly implement these instructions.

The Central Committee resolves to carry out, through the relevant Soviet Institutions, the obligation of the People's Commissariat of Agriculture to urgently develop practical measures for the mass resettlement of the poor onto Cossack Lands.

— Central Committee of the Russian Communist Party
Russian Center for the Preservation and Study of Documents of Modern History. Fund 17. Inventory 4. File 7. Sheet 5;
Fund 17. Inventory 65. File 35. Sheet 216. Typewritten copy.

There was no specific signature under the directive ("Circular Letter"), but the Organizational Bureau of the Central Committee of the Russian Communist Party (Bolsheviks) was headed at that time by Yakov Sverdlov.

During the execution of this directive, stanitsas, khutors and settlements were completely burned and destroyed by artillery fire (chemical shells were also used), and this despite the fact that this directive did not say a word about such barbaric measures – apparently, this was tacitly implied. For example, on May 30, 1919, the stanitsa of Karginskaya (where the Sholokhov family lived) suffered from the Red 33rd Division, in which 20 houses burned down, but the rain that began saved this stanitsa from being completely burned.

Here is another example of such guidelines:

Directive of the Revolutionary Military Council of the Southern Front on Measures to Suppress the Uprising.
March 16, 1919. 1 hour 35 minutes.
Most Secret.
To the Revolutionary Military Councils of the 8th, 9th, 10th Armies.
I propose the following for unwavering implementation: to intensify all efforts to eliminate the disturbances as swiftly as possible by concentrating the maximum available forces to suppress the uprising and by applying the harshest measures against the instigators in the khutors:

a) the burning of rebellious khutors;
b) merciless executions of all persons, without exception, who took direct or indirect part in the uprising;
c) the execution of every 5th or 10th adult male in the rebellious khutors;
d) the mass taking of hostages from khutors neighboring the rebellious ones;
e) the widespread notification of the population of khutors, stanitsas, etc., that any stanitsa or khutor found to be providing assistance to the rebels will be subjected to the merciless extermination of the entire adult male population and burned upon the first discovery of such assistance; the exemplary carrying out of punitive measures, accompanied by their broad public announcement.

The Revolutionary Military Council of the Southern Front must be accurately informed of all measures taken and being taken.
Member of the Revolutionary Military Council Andrey Kolegaev.

— Russian State Military Archives. Fund 100. Inventory 3. File 100. Sheets 17–18. Telegraph tape.

Back in September 1918, the Chairman of the Moscow Council, Pyotr Smidovich, spoke from the rostrum of the All–Russian Central Executive Committee: "...This war is not being waged to bring about an agreement or to subjugate; it is a war of annihilation. There can be no other civil war".

At the beginning of 1919, the Don Cossacks united with Anton Denikin, who promised them autonomy. The All–Great Don Host became part of the South Russia. Power on the Don effectively passes to the Armed Forces of South Russia under the command of General Denikin, and the Cossack units are also subordinate to him.

In January–March 1919, the troops of the Southern Front of the Red Army launched an offensive with the aim of finally defeating the Don Army, as well as against Denikin's Troops for the Donets Basin.

In February 1919, due to irresolvable contradictions with the command of the Volunteer Army, Krasnov resigned and left the Don for Estoniya to Yudenich, and later to Germany. Denikin's Headquarters had been established in Taganrog. The White Troops began an offensive toward Moscow.

The Red Army units that entered the Upper Don District (which, in addition to Russians and Ukrainians, also included Chinese, Latvians, and former Austro–Hungarian prisoners of war (Czechs, Slovaks, Serbs, Croats, and others)), confiscated grain (including seed) and tools (seeders, plows, and so on), carried out repressions, including the compilation of execution lists of disloyal Cossacks, and a number of numerous mass executions. As a result, on March 11, 1919, the Vyoshenskaya uprising of the Upper Don Cossacks broke out, which turned out to be successful.

== Final victory of the Reds ==
In the autumn of 1919, the Offensive of the Armed Forces of South Russia on Moscow was stopped and the Whites, putting up stubborn resistance, slowly but steadily retreated to the south. On January 7, 1920, the Cavalry–Consolidated Corps of Boris Dumenko captured the capital of the White Don, Novocherkassk. On January 10, units of the 1st Cavalry Army under the command of Semyon Budyonny took Rostov–on–Don by force.

On January 17, the Red Army continued its offensive, but the Red Army soldiers failed to gain a foothold on the left bank of the Don, but to the left they still reached the Manych River, threatening the right flank of the Volunteer Corps.

On February 7, under the general leadership of Anton Denikin, the counteroffensive of the Armed Forces of South Russia began. On February 6–8, the Volunteer Corps of Lieutenant General Aleksandr Kutepov and the 3rd Don Separate Corps broke through the defenses of the 8th Army and captured Rostov and Nakhichevan. The «colored» regiments – the Kornilovites, Markovites, and Drozdovites, as well as the Combined Guards Cavalry – particularly distinguished themselves.

However, on February 10, by order of the Supreme Command of the Armed Forces of South Russia, Rostov–on–Don was again abandoned without a fight, due to the flank threat of the Red Units.

On February 25–27, south of the strategically important Sredniy Egorlyk, the Battle of Egorlyk took place – the largest cavalry battle in the history of the Civil War, with up to 25 thousand sabres on both sides, in which General Pavlov's White Cavalry was defeated and retreated to Egorlytskaya.

At the beginning of the Cossack Liberation Struggle (beginning of 1918), the Salskiy District was a region of the struggle for freedom. Here in the steppes, the partisans of the Marching Ataman, General Pyotr Popov, carried out their remarkable «Steppe Campaign». All the Don Kalmyks stood up to defend their stanitsas and joined the detachment of General Pyotr Popov. After the Salskiy District was cleared under Ataman Krasnov, the Don Kalmyks formed two regiments: the 80th Zyungarskiy and the 3rd Don (1st Don Division) – a standing army and a cavalry half–hundred in the Don Ataman's Convoy. Kalmyks as part of the Don Army fought against the Bolsheviks until the very end. When they left their native land, they, as a whole people, with their families, left their stanitsas and retreated with the army to Novorossiysk. Abandoned by the High Command of the White Army on the shore of the Novorossiysk Pier, most of them died, suffering a martyr's death at the hands of the Bolsheviks. The Don Kalmyk emigration numbered a little more than a thousand souls, scattered across different countries, but a characteristic phenomenon for them was that they settled abroad without dispersing, but preserved large groups, forming their own Kalmyk khutors and stanitsas, and individuals joined general Cossack organizations.

On March 26–27, the 40,000–strong Volunteer Corps left Novorossiysk by sea for Crimea.

The Third Don Kalmyk Regiment, formed from Sal Cossacks – Don Kalmyks, did not accept the Reds' offer to capitulate and, together with the 3rd Drozdovskiy Regiment, covered the evacuation. However, if the 3rd Drozdovskiy Regiment, initially forgotten on the shore, was taken out on the destroyer Pylkiy, with Lieutenant General Aleksandr Kutepov returning specially for it, then the 3rd Kalmyk Regiment, during the evacuation from Novorossiysk, was left on the shore and, for the most part, along with the civilian refugees who were following in the regiment's convoy – families of Kalmyk Cossacks – were executed by the Red Army soldiers.

The 80th Zyungarskiy Regiment, consisting of Don Kalmyks – Cossacks, was luckier, conducting rearguard battles and covering the retreat of a large party of Don, Kuban and Terek Cossacks to Adler and their subsequent loading onto ships. The majority of the Don, Kuban and Terek regiments, pressed to the shore, accepted the terms of capitulation and surrendered to the Red Army units. The 80th Zyungarskiy Regiment did not accept the terms of capitulation, did not lay down its arms, and was evacuated in full force to Crimea along with the remnants of the Don Units. In teh, the 80th Zyungarskiy Regiment marched in parade formation before the Commander–in–Chief of the Armed Forces of South Russia, Pyotr Vrangel, since among the units evacuated from Novorossiysk and Adler, besides this regiment, there was not a single whole and armed unit.

Soviet power was finally established in the Don and adjacent territories. The All–Great Don Host ceased to exist.

== See also ==
- Bibliography of the Russian Revolution and Civil War
- Outline of the Russian Revolution and Civil War
- Index of articles related to the Russian Revolution and Civil War
- The "Russian" Civil Wars, 1916–1926: Ten Years That Shook the World
- Russia in Flames: War, Revolution, Civil War, 1914–1921
- Russia in Revolution: An Empire in Crisis, 1890 to 1928
- Russia: Revolution and Civil War, 1917—1921
- The Russian Revolution: A New History
- Don Soviet Republic
- De-Cossackization
- Iași–Don Campaign of Drozdovskiy's Detachment
- First Kuban (Ice) Campaign

== Sources ==
- Andrey Venkov (2008). Ataman Krasnov and the Don Army. 1918. History of the Cossacks. Moskva: Veche. ISBN 978-5-9533-2098-6.
- Venkov, Andrey (2012). Vyoshenskaya Uprising (PDF). Moskva: Veche. ISBN 978-5-9533-6038-8.
- Sergey Volkov, ed. (2004). The Don Army in the Fight Against the Bolsheviks. Moskva: Closed Joint–Stock Company Tsentrpoligraf. ISBN 5-9524-1360-9.
- Arltan Baskhaev. Kalmyks. Under the Military Banner of Russia
- Sanzha Balykov. Memories of the Zyungarskiy Regiment. Almanac «White Guard». No. 8. The Cossacks of Russiain the White Movement. Moskva: Posev. 2005. Pages 45–52. Publication by Vasiliy Tsvetkov
- Svyatoslav Denisov. Civil War in the South of Russia– Constantinople: Printing House «Pressa», 1921
- Vladimir Dobrynin. The Fight Against Bolshevism in the South of Russia// The Fight Against Bolshevism in the South of Russia. Participation in the Struggle of the Don Cossacks – Prague, 1921
- Roman Gul. Ice March (with Kornilov) // Military Literature Website
- Kenéz Péter (2017). The True History of the Volunteer Army. 1917–1918. Moskva: Algoritm. ISBN 978-5-906979-90-2.
- Krasnov, Pyotr (1922). The All–Great Don Host // Archive of the Russian Revolution. Vol. 5. Berlin. pp. 190–321.
- Lev Trotskiy. «The Don Host» – Decree of the Council of People's Commissars of September 3, 1918
- Directive of the Revolutionary Military Council of the Southern Front of March 16, 1919 – Quoted From Sergey Ivanov. The Tragedy of the Cossacks // Russian Socio–Political Monthly Newspaper «Formations of Special Purpose of Russia». August 2007 – No. 8 (131)
- Directive of the Revolutionary Military Council of the 8th Army No. 1522 of March 17, 1919 – Quoted From Sergey Ivanov. The Tragedy of the Cossacks // Russian Socio–Political Monthly Newspaper «Formations of Special Purpose of Russia». August 2007 – No. 8 (131)
- Resolution of the Don Bureau of the Russian Communist Party (Bolsheviks) «On the Basic Principles in Relation to the Cossacks». April 1919 – Quoted From Sergey Ivanov. The Tragedy of the Cossacks // Russian Socio–Political Monthly Newspaper «Formations of Special Purpose of Russia». August 2007 – No. 8 (131)
