= Donbas-Don operation =

Military campaign

- Part of the Southern Front of the Russian Civil War
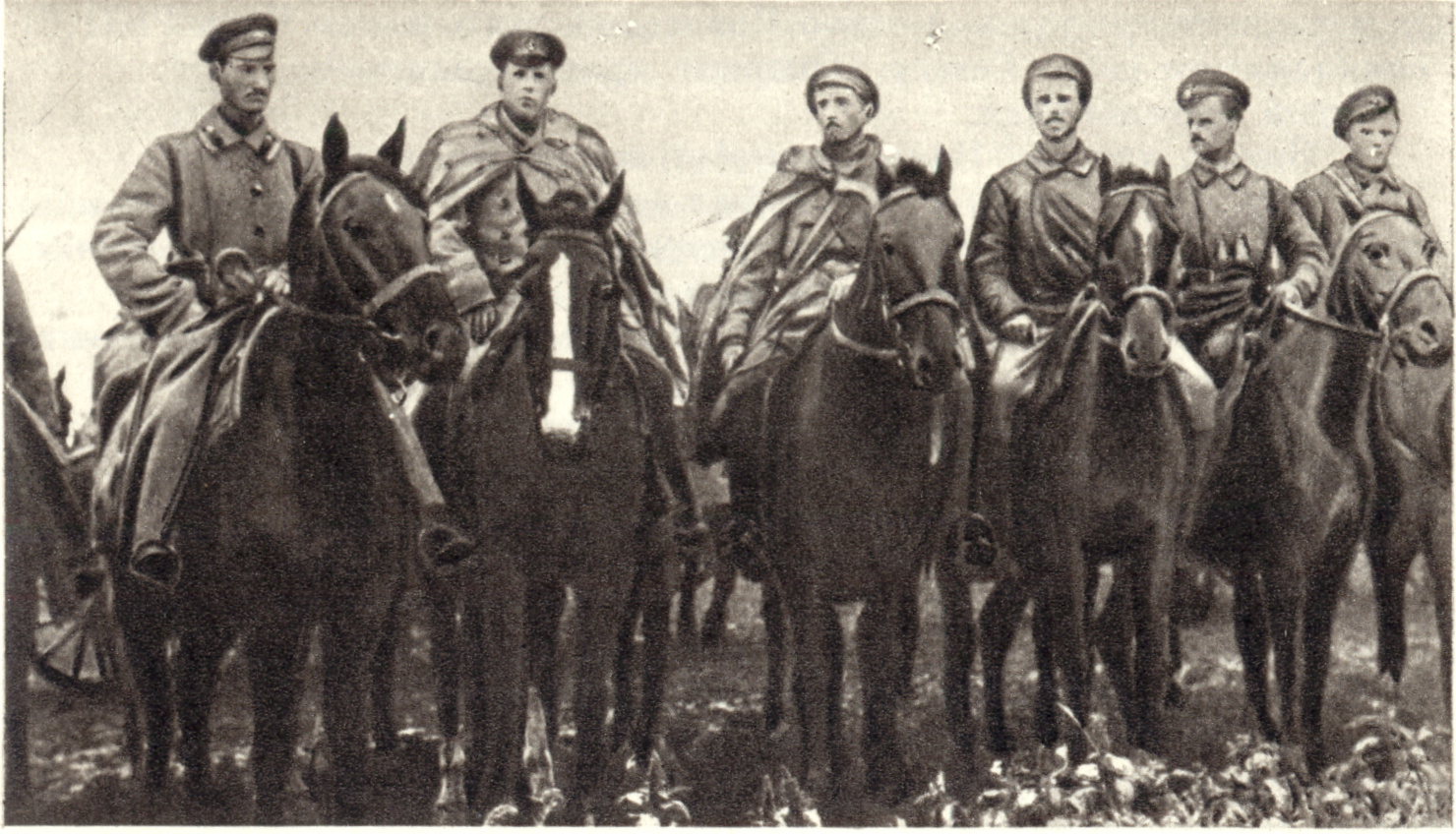
- Rudolf Sivers and a Red Guards detachment
Date	8 January – 25 February 1918
Location	Donbas and Don Host Oblast, southern Russia
Result	Soviet victory: Bolsheviks consolidate power over European Russia; Volunteer Army undertake a retreat to Yekaterinodar; Don Cossacks undertake a retreat towards the Sal; Don Soviet Republic proclaimed in Rostov

Belligerents
Russian Republic (Don Republic) Don Host	(Russian Socialist Federative Soviet Republic) Russian Soviet Republic; Ukrainian People's Republic of Soviets

Commanders and leaders
(Russian Republic) Lavr Kornilov (Russian Republic) Mikhail Alekseyev (Russian Republic) Anton Denikin (Russian Republic) Alexander Kutepov (Don Republic) Alexey Kaledin † (Don Republic) Vasily Chernetsov † (Don Republic) Anatoli Nazarov (executed) (Don Republic) Pyotr Popov	(Russian Socialist Federative Soviet Republic) Vladimir Antonov-Ovseyenko (Russian Socialist Federative Soviet Republic) Yuriy Sablin (Russian Socialist Federative Soviet Republic) Rudolf Sivers (Russian Socialist Federative Soviet Republic) Mikhail Petrov (Russian Socialist Federative Soviet Republic) Fyodor Podtiolkov (Russian Socialist Federative Soviet Republic) Mikhail Krivoshlykov

Units involved
(Russian Republic) Volunteer Army (Don Republic) Don Cossacks	Southern Revolutionary Front; Red Cossacks

The Donbas-Don operation was a military campaign of the Russian Civil War that lasted from January to February 1918, by forces of the Southern Revolutionary Front under the command of Vladimir Antonov-Ovseyenko, against the Cossack troops of Alexey Kaledin and Volunteer detachments on the territory of the Donbas and the Don Cossack region. It was the decisive operation in the complete conquest of Russia by the Bolsheviks following the October Revolution.

== Background ==
In November 1917, Bolsheviks, Mensheviks and Socialist Revolutionaries created a joint revolutionary-military committee in Rostov-on-Don. At the call of the Bolsheviks, 2,000 sailors from the Black Sea Fleet, based in Sevastopol, joined the Red Guards. On 9 December 1917, the committee initiated an uprising in the city; the Socialist Revolutionaries and Mensheviks, who did not agree with this decision, subsequently left the committee. The uprising was a success and the Bolsheviks took control of Rostov. Six days later, counter-revolutionary Cossack troops under the command of Alexei Kaledin attacked Rostov, defeating a numerically stronger, but less organized and commanded Red Guard. The sailors in particular turned out to be of little value. After losing a clash with the Cossacks, the sailors shot one of their commanders at the station, accusing him of treason, before they returned to Crimea.

In Rostov and Novocherkassk, the former Imperial Russian generals Lavr Kornilov and Mikhail Alekseyev initiated the creation of the counter-revolutionary Volunteer Army. The Council of People's Commissars, headed by Vladimir Lenin, considered the mobilization over the Don to be the greatest threat to their government, due to the number of Cossacks who could join the counter-revolutionary troops, and also because the Volunteer Army and the Cossacks posed a direct threat to the Donbas, which had been sympathetic to the October Revolution. Finally, control over Rostov and Novocherkassk would give the Red Guards a rail link to the Caucasus. It was decided to transfer troops from central Russia to this region, led by Vladimir Antonov-Ovseenko, one of the commanders of the Bolshevik coup in Petrograd. His hastily organized force consisted, in addition to units led from the north, of workers' units from Donbas. At the end of December 1917, the army of Antonov-Ovseenko, together with local Bolshevik troops, captured Kharkiv. On 24-25 December 1917, an All-Ukrainian Congress of Councils was held in the city, during which they proclaimed the creation of the Ukrainian People's Republic of Soviets. Part of Antonov-Ovseenko's troops was directed to support it in an armed struggle against the forces loyal to the Central Council of Ukraine, while the others continued the fight against Kaledin.

== Plan ==
In the fight against Kaledin and Kornilov, Antonov-Ovseenko intended to cooperate with the Red Cossacks, led by Fyodor Podtiolkov and Mikhail Krivoshlykov, as well as with Mikhail Petrov's red troops going south from Voronezh. After taking control of Rostov-on-Don and Novocherkassk, he expected to march further south to join the troops of the 39th Infantry Division of the Russian Army, who had shown strong sympathies for the Bolsheviks prior to the revolution. On 8 January 1918, Antonov-Ovseenko divided his forces into two groups: the first, headed by Rudolf Sivers, numbering 10,000 soldiers, was to attack Taganrog, and then Rostov, the second, under the command of Yuriy Sablin, was entrusted with the task of joining Petrov's troops.

== Battle ==
The Reds had an enormous numerical advantage over the Don, but they fought without enthusiasm or discipline. More than once, individual units on their own entered into local truces with the enemy forces and withdrew from the fight. This was the case with the soldiers of the 39th Division, who formed a truce on their own with the 8th Cossack Division.

Sablin's group managed to connect with Petrov's troops, but on 31 January, they suffered a defeat at Licha in a battle against Vasily Chernetsov's Cossacks. Shortly thereafter, however, Chernetsov's unit broke the previously agreed local truce and was smashed on 3 February by Fyodor Podtiolkov's unit. This victory opened the way to Novocherkassk for Yuri Sablin's group.

On 25 January, Sivers' group was defeated at Matvieyovy Kurgan by Alexander Kutepov's less numerous but more disciplined unit, in the first serious clashes with the Whites. Two days later, however, the Whites had to withdraw some of their forces to Taganrog, where a workers' uprising had broken out. On 2 February, the Bolsheviks took over the city, and a day later Sivers' troops began their march towards it, arriving on 8 February.

Not wanting to completely destroy the newly created anti-Bolshevik forces, Kornilov and Alekseyev decided to leave Rostov and Novocherkassk. Kaledin refused to leave the Don and committed suicide on 12 May. White forces left Rostov in an orderly manner on the night of 21-22 February, starting the Ice March towards Yekaterinodar. On 23 February, Sivers captured Rostov. The Cossack troops from Novocherkassk did not manage to do the same, because on 25 February, the city was taken over by the reconstructed local revolutionary-military committee. Only 1,500 Cossacks, led by Pyotr Popov, fled the city chaotically and began their own Steppe March towards the Sal. Sablin's troops immediately entered the city in their wake. Anatoli Nazarov and krug President Voloshinov were arrested and executed six days later.

== See also ==
- Bibliography of the Russian Revolution and Civil War
- Outline of the Russian Revolution and Civil War
- Index of articles related to the Russian Revolution and Civil War
- The "Russian" Civil Wars, 1916–1926: Ten Years That Shook the World
- Russia in Flames: War, Revolution, Civil War, 1914–1921
- Russia in Revolution: An Empire in Crisis, 1890 to 1928
- Russia: Revolution and Civil War, 1917—1921
- The Russian Revolution: A New History
