= Monument to Sergey Markov =

Monument to General Sergey Markov
- Памятник генералу С. Л. Маркову
- Interactive map of Monument to General Sergey Markov
- Location: Salsk, Rostov Oblast, Russia
- Designer: Alexey Begunov
- Material: bronze, granite
- Beginning date: 2003
- Completion date: 2003
- Opening date: 6 May 1904
- Dedicated to: Sergey Markov

Monument to General Sergey Markov is a monument to Sergey Leonidovich Markov, Lieutenant-General of the Imperial Russian Army, hero of Russian-Japanese War and World War I and one of the leaders of the White movement. It was erected on December 13, 2003 in Salsk (Rostov Oblast). It is the first monument to a White movement leader in Russia.

The architect is Alexey Begun, and sculptors are Vladimir and Danila Surovtsevs. The monument is made of bronze and granite.

== History ==
In 2001, an initiative group for installation of the monument was formed. After two years of their efforts, town administration decided to build the monument near the site of death of the general. Salsk from 1918 to 1920 was named Markov in honour of him.

Support for the project was declared from many Russian officials, including Presidential Administration and Ministry of Foreign Affairs. The monument has also received the blessing of Archpriest of Rostov and Novocherkassk Panteleimon.

Initially it was planned to erect the monument in the city of Rostov-on-Don, near the building where the headquarters of the Volunteer Army were situated and where generals Lavr Kornilov and Mikhail Alekseev began their famous "Ice March".

However, after a meeting of the interdepartmental commission on the city street names, squares and other places of public interest, as well as after meetings at the Ministry of Culture of the Rostov region, it was decided to erect a monument in the town of Salsk. In the Rostov region there was held a TV poll in order to determine the reaction to the installation of the monument in the region. Most of the respondents reacted positively.

The construction works were mostly funded by local citizens.

Opening of the monument took place December 13, 2003 and was timed to the 85th anniversary of the death of Sergey Markov. The opening ceremony was attended by Deputy Governor of the Rostov Oblast, Ataman of the Great Don Army V.P. Vodolatsky and other officials.

== Sources ==
- Памятник генералу Маркову
- Открытие памятника Сергею Леонидовичу Маркову
- В. Суровцев: «Вернуть России незаслуженно забытые имена»
- Picture of the monument in Russian Wikipedia
