= Steppe March =

1918 retreat of Don Cossacks during the Russian Civil War

- Part of the Southern Front of the Russian Civil War
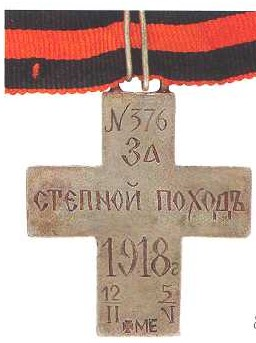
- Steppe March medal
Date	February 25, 1918 – May 18, 1918
Location	Don Host Oblast, Southern Russia
Result	Survival of the Don Army

Belligerents
(Russia) Don Army	(Russian Socialist Federative Soviet Republic) Red Army

Commanders and leaders
(Russia) Piotr Popov (Russia) Ivan Popov	(Russian Socialist Federative Soviet Republic) Boris Dumenko (Russian Socialist Federative Soviet Republic) Fedor Podtieklov

Strength
1,727	Unknown

Casualties and losses
81 men	Unknown

The Steppe March (Russian: Степной поход) was a successful military withdrawal by the Don Cossacks in spring 1918 towards the steppe around the Sal River to ensure their survival since they were being attacked by the Red Army.

In January and February 1918, the Red Army had conducted the successful Donbass-Don Operation. Rostov-on-Don was occupied on February 23, and the Cossack capital of Novocherkassk on February 25. Don Cossack Ataman Alexei Kaledin killed himself on 11 February 1918.

The Volunteer Army, under the command of Generals Mikhail Alekseyev and Lavr Kornilov, retreated during the Ice March to the Kuban. Field Ataman Pyotr Popov's Don Cossacks wanted to stay in the Don River region and instead departed toward the Sal River on 26 February. Popov's force included 1500 Cossacks, five guns, and 40 machine guns. On 23 April, the 's force, now diminished to 1000, linked up with K. S. Poliakov's Zaplavskaia Army at Konstantinovskaia. From the combined force, Popov organized Southern, Northern and Trans-Don army groups, under S. V. Denisov, Semiletov, and Semenov respectively.

On 6 May, the Southern group helped capture Novocherkassk, which coincided with the German advance and the arrival of Mikhail Drozdovsky's men from Romania.

== See also ==
- Bibliography of the Russian Revolution and Civil War
- Outline of the Russian Revolution and Civil War
- Index of articles related to the Russian Revolution and Civil War
- The "Russian" Civil Wars, 1916–1926: Ten Years That Shook the World
- Russia in Flames: War, Revolution, Civil War, 1914–1921
- Russia in Revolution: An Empire in Crisis, 1890 to 1928
- Russia: Revolution and Civil War, 1917—1921
- The Russian Revolution: A New History
