= Iași–Don March =

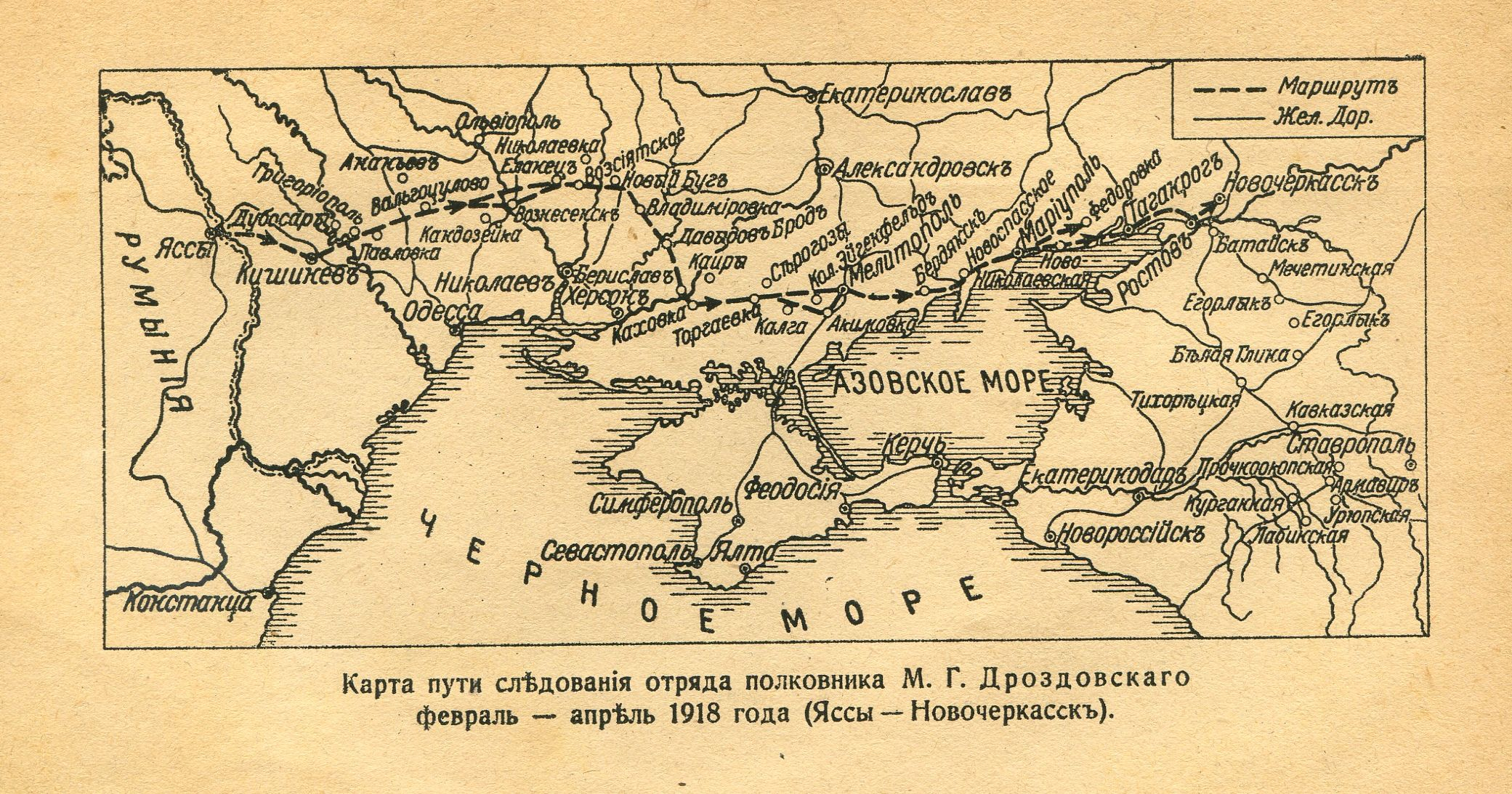
Map of the march of Drozdovsky's detachment

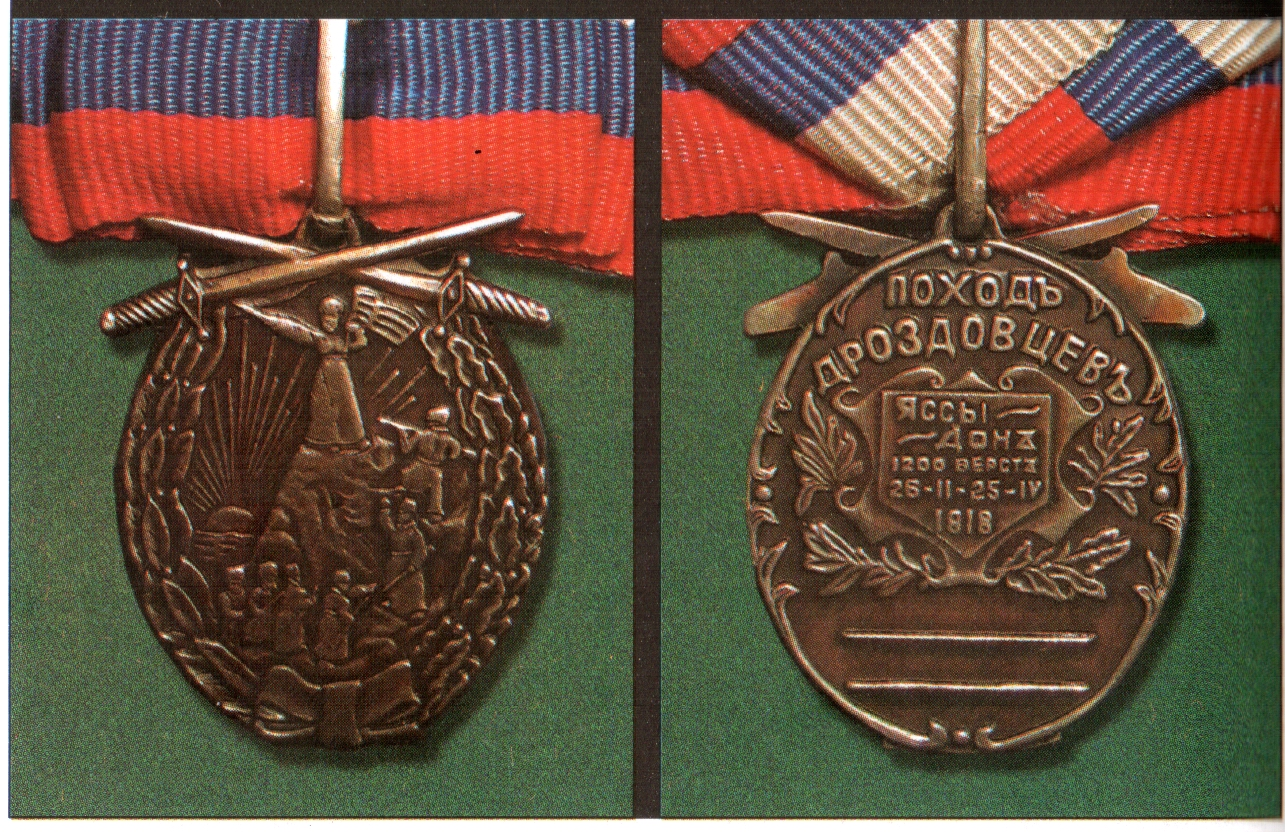
Medal of the Iași–Don March

The Iași–Don March, also known in Russia as Drozdovsky's March or the Romanian March, was a march of a Russian Volunteer detachment, led by Staff Colonel Mikhail Drozdovsky during the Russian Civil War. The detachment marched from Iași on the Romanian front to the Don, to join the White Russian Volunteer Army of General Lavr Kornilov and fight the Bolshevik enemy together. It took place between February 26 (New Style March 11) and April 24 (New Style May 7), 1918. This March, as well as the First Kuban Campaign, was a milestone in the formation of the White movement in Southern Russia.

== The March ==
Colonel Drozdovsky, a staunch monarchist, had gathered around him in Iași after the October Revolution a detachment of between 800 and 1500 men, most of whom were young officers. Cut off from the rest of Russia after the signing of the Brest-Litovsk Treaty, the formation of an independent Ukrainian People's Republic and the destruction of the Odesa Soviet Republic by the advancing Germans, he decided to march to Novocherkassk on the Don to join the White Russian Volunteer Army.

According to Peter Kenez, "Drozdovskii and his men challenged the Romanians to disarm them. The Romanian parliament was in session and Drozdovskii aimed his cannons at the parliament building; he threatened to fire at the first hostile action. It was not necessary. Under pressure, the Romanians even gave trains to transport the troublesome army to Kishinev in order to get rid of them as soon as possible. The small army moved quickly through the Ukraine; at time the soldiers covered 40 to 45 miles a day. The German advance and Drozdovskii's march coincided. In fact, for all practical purposes the Germans and Drozdovskii collaborated." On 4 May, Drozdovsky's force arrived at Rostov-on-Don, and on 6 May helped capture Novocherkassk from the Bolsheviks.

The detachment consisted of a skirmisher regiment, a cavalry division (commanded by Chief of Staff Colonel Voïnalovitch), a mounted mountain battery, a light battery, a mortar company, a technical unit, a hospital and the train. This detachment, reinforced along the way by other small groups including Colonel Jebrak, marched 1,200 kilometers from March to May 1918 from Iași to Novocherkassk.

The detachment suffered some 100 casualties, including Colonel Voïnalovitch. Leaving Rostov, Drozdovsky's men helped the Don Cossacks, in rebellion against Bolshevik power, to retake Novocherkassk. On the evening of May 7, 1918, the "Drozdovsky" detachment arrived in Novocherkassk under the acclamation of the inhabitants, bringing an end to the "Romanian march".

== See also ==
- Bibliography of the Russian Revolution and Civil War
- Outline of the Russian Revolution and Civil War
- Index of articles related to the Russian Revolution and Civil War
- The "Russian" Civil Wars, 1916–1926: Ten Years That Shook the World
- Russia in Flames: War, Revolution, Civil War, 1914–1921
- Russia in Revolution: An Empire in Crisis, 1890 to 1928
- Russia: Revolution and Civil War, 1917—1921
- The Russian Revolution: A New History
