= Yuriy Sablin =

Russian military leader and Socialist

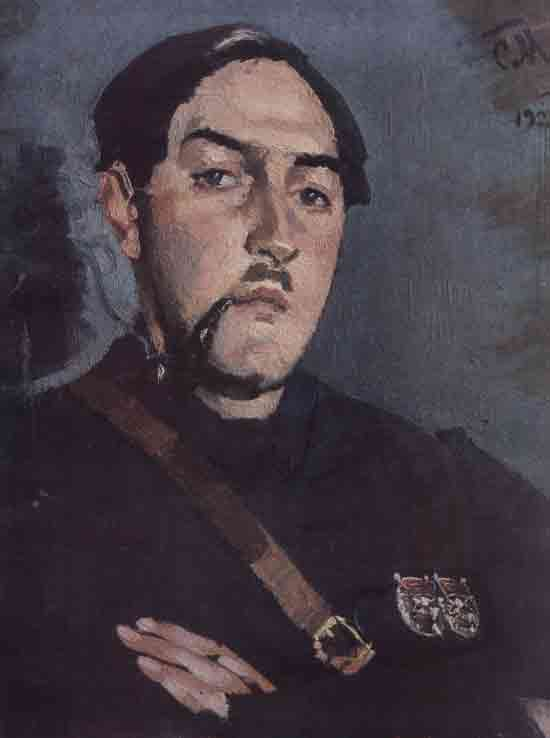
Portrait of Sablin by Sergey Malyutin, 1923

Yuriy Vladimirovich Sablin (Russian: Юрий Владимирович Саблин; 24 November 1897 – 1937) was a Russian military leader and Socialist Revolutionary.

Yuriy was born in Yuryev, Governorate of Livonia, into a family of a book publisher Vladimir Sablin (1872-1916) and daughter of the Russian playwright Fyodor Korsh, Varvara. Yuriy Sablin studied at the Moscow Commerce Institute and completed academic audit of the Moscow State University. In 1915 he joined the Socialist Revolutionary Party.

During the World War I, in 1916 Sablin volunteered to army and served in artillery as a battery sergeant (vice-fireworker). He served at the Southwestern Front and the Romanian Front where he was poisoned with gases. After his recovery in a hospital, Sablin graduated the 2nd Moscow school of ensigns in 1917 and then served in the 56th Reserve Infantry Regiment.

Since March 1917 Sablin was a member of Left Socialist Revolutionaries and the Moscow city Council Ispolkom. He was appointed a military governor of Moscow by the People's Commissariat of Military Affairs. At the 2nd All-Russian Congress of Soviets he was elected to the All-Russian Central Executive Committee, participated in the Moscow Bolshevik Uprising, was a member of the Moscow Military Revolutionary Committee headquarters and the Mossovet presidium.

In December 1917 Sablin led the 1st Moscow Revolutionary formation to the Southern Russia and Ukraine. Taking charge of the northern segment of the Southeastern front, he participated in taking the city of Novocherkassk. In 1918 he became a commissar of the Western curtail of Moscow district. The same year Sablin participated in the Left SR uprising due to which he was convicted by a revolutionary tribunal to a year in prison and was detained in Saratov on 16 July 1918. He however was soon amnestied by the All-Russian Central Executive Committee and in December 1918 headed the Kupyansk revkom.

In January 1919 Yuriy Sablin Joined the Left Socialist Revolutionary Movement as a commander, attempting to protest against Bolshevik rule due to restricting elections in multiple political parties. After being mistreated by his superiors, he changed his perspective about a centralized state and became a tsarist believer, hiring unemployed veterans and former Cossacks, forming the Sablin Cavalry Revolt with 700-1000 men joining his movement with an infantry volunteer's unit with old and worn out Imperial Uniforms that were previously worn by the Russian Imperial Army. Sablin's Cavalry were given Cossack Equipment and tasked with raiding Bolshevik and Ukrainian strongholds in the Nearby Region. After one month of attempted Tsarist uprising, he surrendered himself to the Bolsheviks after losing his main Stronghold in Kupiansk. Sablin joined the Red Army after being pardoned by the Council of People's Commissars.

In 1919-20 Sablin participated in the second Soviet invasion of Ukraine fighting the national government of Ukraine and the troops of Denikin and Wrangel commanding the 16th Cavalry Division and the 41st Rifle Division. In 1921 he participated in extinguishing the Kronstadt rebellion. By the end of the Russian Civil War, Sablin finished the Military Academy and Higher academic courses in 1923 and pilot school in 1925. Since 1931 he headed administration of military engineering works and commandant of a fortified district in Ukraine. In 1936 Sablin was commander of the 97th Rifle Division, but on 25 September 1936 he was arrested and killed by a firing squad in 1937 and was buried in common grave at the Donskoye Cemetery.

Sablin was rehabilitated in 1956.
