= Boris Dumenko =

Red Army commander during the Russian Civil War

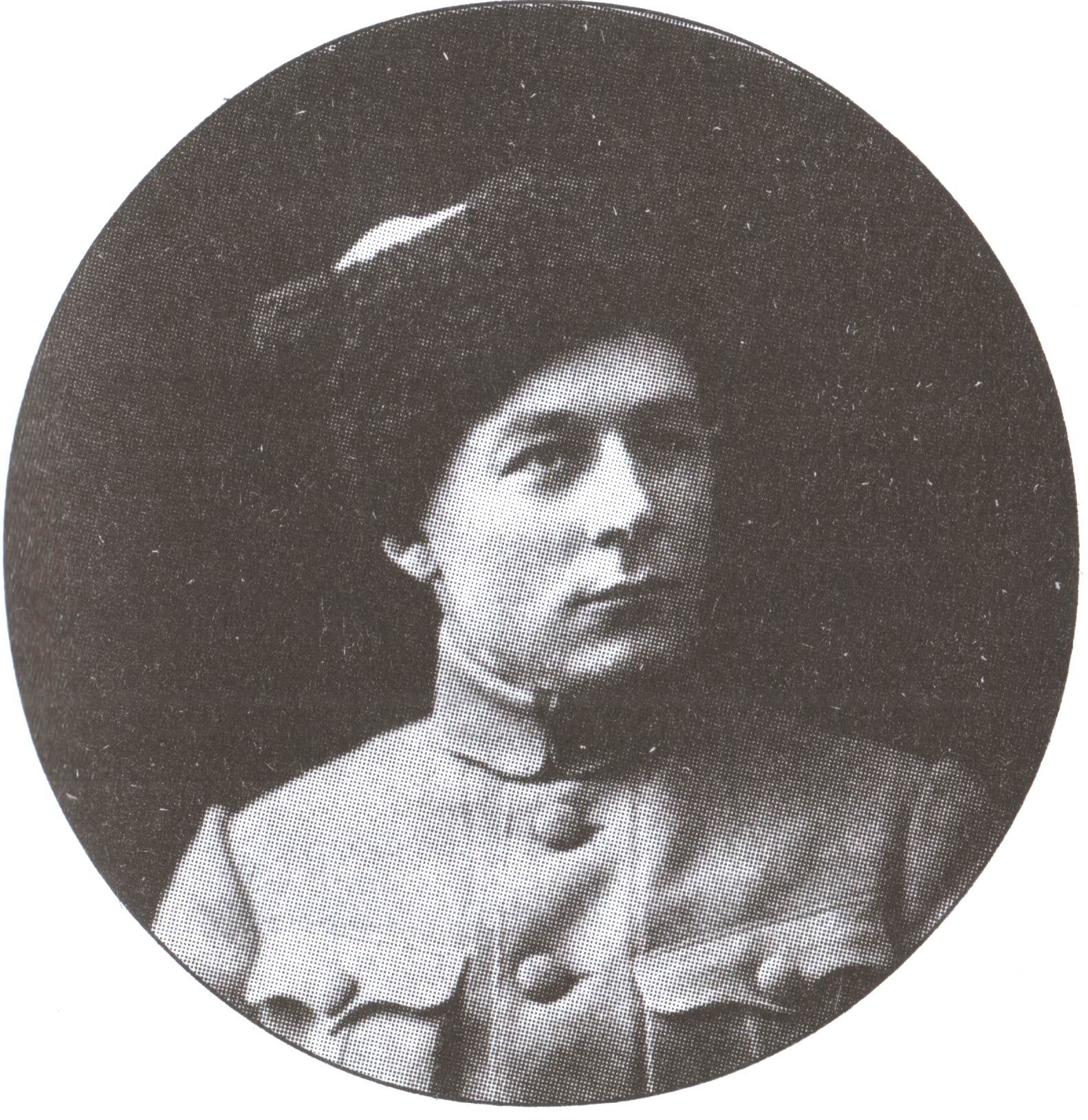
Boris Dumenko

Boris Mokeevich Dumenko (Russian: Борис Мокеевич Думенко) (1888 – 11 May 1920) was a Red Army commander during the Russian Civil War.

== Biography ==
Dumenko was born in the Don region and took an active part in the organization of the first Soviet cavalry units.

A sergeant at the end of World War I, he returned to the Don and took command of a small unit of Red Cossacks, with Semyon Budyonny as his deputy and assistant. In September 1918, he became commander of the 1st Cavalry Brigade and in December 1918 of the 1st Cavalry Division within the 10th Army. In January 1919, he became commander of the 4th Cavalry Division of Petrograd. In April 1919, he was appointed assistant Chief of Staff of the 10th Army for the Cavalry. On 25 May 1919, he was seriously wounded by a bullet in a lung and he was evacuated to Saratov. On 14 September 1919, he became commander of the newly created Cavalry Corps. Between September and December 1919, the Cavalry Corps won a series of battles and advanced over the Don Region towards the Caucasus. On 7 January 1920, it took Novocherkassk, the capital of the Don Army.

== Death ==
Despite the fact that Dumenko had joined the Russian Communist Party (Bolsheviks) in January 1920, the Political Department of the corps and higher political authorities accused him of encouraging anti-Bolshevik and anti-Semitic sentiments among the rank-and-file troopers, hampering the work of the military commissars, and insufficiently combating the robbery and drunkenness of the Red Army soldiers. In order to resolve the growing serious conflict between Dumenko and the political Department, a new military commissar, V.N. Mikeladze, was sent to the Cavalry Corps in December 1919, but was killed in February 1920 under unclear circumstances. The identity of the murderer was not established by the investigation. Despite this, Dumenko was arrested along with six of his closest assistants on charges of killing the military commissar and preparing a mutiny. The accusations came from Dmitry Zhloba, the commander of one of the brigades, military adviser G. Peskarev, and commissar Kravtsov. Dumenko's trial was presided over by Alexander Beloborodov.

Found guilty, Dumenko and three others were shot on 11 or 13 May 1920. The background of this execution is the conflict between Trotsky and Stalin. Dumenko was a supporter of Joseph Stalin, his successor Mikhail Tukhachevsky a nominee of Leon Trotsky. Dumenko had been highly critical on the policy of Lev Trotsky of having political commissaries control the Army commanders from the rearguard and not in combat.

Dumenko was rehabilitated in August 1964.
