= Sal (Russia) =

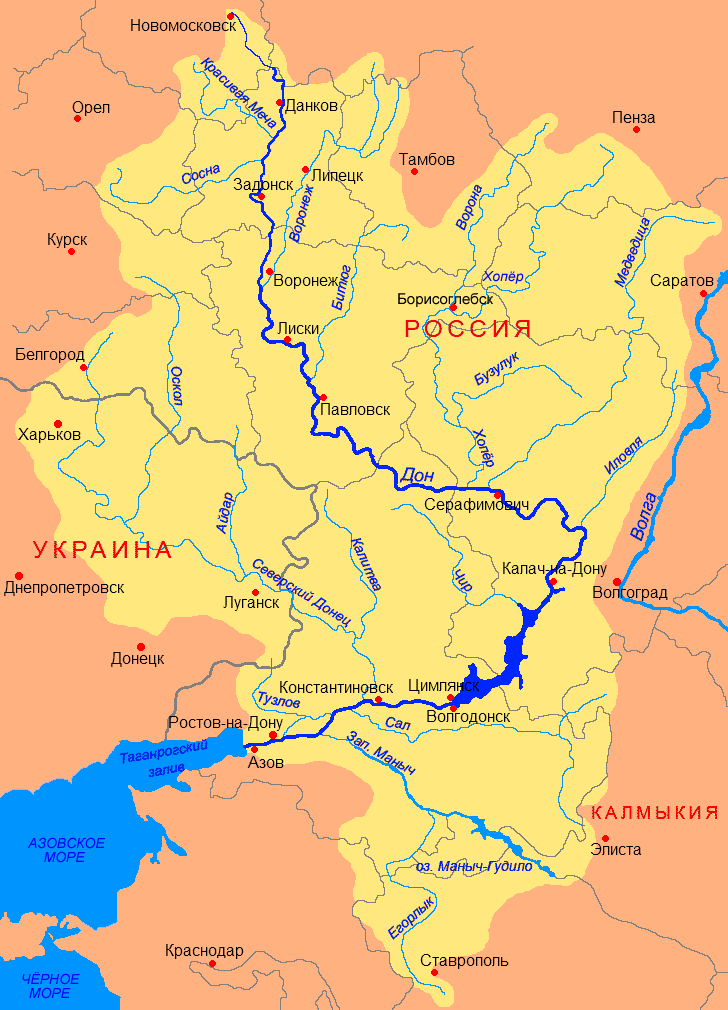
- Location of the Sal River (Сал)
- Native name: Сал (Russian)

Location
- Country: Russia

Physical characteristics
- Source
  - location: Yergeni
- Mouth: Don
  - coordinates: 47°31′10″N 40°43′52″E
- Length: 776 km (482 mi)
- Basin size: 21,300 km^{2} (8,200 sq mi)

Basin features
- Progression: Don→ Sea of Azov

The Sal (Russian: Сал) is a river on the Black Sea–Caspian Steppe of southern Russia, a left tributary to the river Don. It is 776 kilometres (482 mi) long, and has a drainage basin of 21,300 square kilometres (8,200 sq mi). Its source is in the western part of the Russian republic Kalmykia. It rises just west of Elista, flows north, turns and flows west between the rivers Don and Manych. It is separated from the Manych by the low Sal-Manych Rise. It joins the river Don near Semikarakorsk. Maximum flow is during the March–April snowmelt. It is much used for irrigation.
