= Ice March =

1918 retreat of the White movement during the Russian Civil War

First Kuban Campaign or Ice March
- Part of the Southern Front of the Russian Civil War
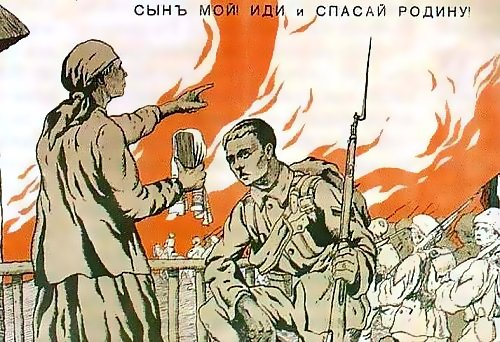
- A Volunteer Army recruitment poster represents a woman addressing her son with the words: "My son! Go and save your Motherland!"
Date	February 22 – May 13, 1918
Location	Kuban Oblast, Southern Russia
Result	see § Aftermath

Belligerents
(Russia) White movement: Volunteer Army	(Russian Socialist Federative Soviet Republic) Bolsheviks: Red Army

Commanders and leaders
(Russia) Lavr Kornilov † (Russia) Mikhail Alekseyev (Russia) Anton Denikin (Russia) Sergey Markov	(Russian Socialist Federative Soviet Republic) Ivan Sorokin (Russian Socialist Federative Soviet Republic) Alexei Avtonomov (Russian Socialist Federative Soviet Republic) Rudolf Sivers

Strength
Volunteer Army: initially 4,000, later 6,000 (2,000 Don Cossacks); 14 artillery pieces	Red Army: 24,000–60,000; 20+ artillery pieces 3 armored trains

Casualties and losses
400 killed 1,500 wounded 2,000 deserted	5,000-20,000+ killed (exact number unknown); 10,000 wounded 7,000 captured 3,000 fled 2 armored trains captured or destroyed During the battle of Yekaterinodar: 15,000 lost, about 10,000 of which were wounded

Map of the march

The Ice March (Russian: Ледяной поход), also known as the First Kuban Campaign (Russian: Первый кубанский поход), was a military withdrawal lasting from February to May 1918 that was one of the defining moments in the Russian Civil War (1917–1922). Under attack by the Red Army advancing from the north, the forces of the Volunteer Army, part of the White movement, began a retreat from the city of Rostov south towards the Kuban in the hope of gaining the support of the Kuban Cossacks against the Bolshevik government in Moscow.

== Volunteer Army ==
After the October Revolution in Russia in November [O.S. October] 1917, many of those opposed to the new Bolshevik government gravitated towards the fringes of the former Russian Empire, particularly to the parts still under the control of the Imperial German Army. In the Don Cossack capital of Novocherkassk (near Rostov-on-Don), the Don Cossack Host had elected General Aleksei Kaledin to the position of ataman at its traditional assembly, the Host Krug, on 1 July [O.S. 18 June] 1917. On 20 November [O.S. 7 November] 1917, not long after the Bolsheviks had taken control of Central Russia, the Don Host Krug declared its independence. Novocherkassk became a haven for those opposed to the Bolshevik Revolution and soon hosted the headquarters of the Volunteer Army, which was made up for the most part of former Tsarist officers, and under the command of General Mikhail Alekseyev and General Lavr Kornilov.

The Cossacks aimed primarily to defend their independence, but the Volunteers persuaded them that they could guarantee that only by joining with them in fighting against the Bolsheviks, who had the support of a large part of the non-Cossack population of the Don region. With the encouragement of Kaledin, the Whites, still only some 500-strong, managed to recapture the city of Rostov from local Red Guard units on 15 December [O.S. 2 December] 1917.

However, by the beginning of 1918, better-organised and stronger Communist forces began an advance from the north and captured Taganrog, on the Sea of Azov, on 10 February [O.S. 28 January] 1918.

Kornilov, now in command of some 4,000 men at Rostov, judged it pointless to attempt a defence of the city in the face of superior forces. Instead, the Volunteers made ready to relocate to the south, deep into the Kuban, in the hope of attracting more support though the whole area was in deep winter. Thus began the Ice March.

With his defences gone and his government in a state of collapse, Kaledin shot himself on 11 February [O.S. 29 January] 1918.

== Kornilov's death ==
On 23 February, as the Red Army entered Rostov, Kornilov began the march south across the frozen steppelands. The soldiers, carrying one rifle each, and hauling some field artillery, were accompanied by long trail of civilians from Rostov fearful of Bolshevik reprisals. Anton Denikin, Kornilov's second-in-command, later recalled, "We went from the dark night of spiritual slavery to unknown wandering-in search of the bluebird". The bluebird was a traditional symbol of hope in Russian fairy tales and legend.

From his 4,000 men, Kornilov formed three regiments under General S. L. Markov, Colonel M. O. Nezhentsev, General Afrikan P. Bogaewsky, and a battalion under General A. A. Borovsky. Another thousand civilians accompanied the army, including the politicians V. N. Lvov, L. V. Polovtsev, L. N., Novosiltsev, and N. P. Shchetnina, as well as journalists, professors, soldiers' wives, doctors and nurses.

According to the historian Peter Kenez, "United by a boundless hatred of the enemy, the soldiers performed miracles of military accomplishment; the world had seen few armies of comparable size with greater fighting ability". On 23 February, the army entered Olginskaya for a rendezvous with Ataman Popov on 26 February. However, Popov elected to stay within the Don, while the Volunteer Army headed south towards Ekaterinodar and the Kuban.

The march took them through Stavropol Governorate and their first battle, and victory, against the Bolsheviks was on 6 March at Lezhanka. On 9 March, the army entered the Kuban, and another battle happened on 14 March at Berezanskaya. On 17 March, after four days of fighting, the army captured Korenovskaya and its large cache of military supplies. On 28 March, the most bitter battle was fought against the Bolsheviks in which a number of Volunteer officers froze to death while they tried to cross a small river with shallow icy water, hence the name of the campaign. By the end of March, the Volunteer Army had absorbed Viktor Pokrovsky's Kuban Army, which had recently fled Yekaterinodar.

With his army now doubled in size, Kornilov decided to mount an attack on Yekaterinodar, the capital of the recently-established North Caucasian Soviet Republic. Kornilov organized his army into three brigades under Markov, Bogaevsky and Erdeli. The attack, which began on 10 April, was met with heavy resistance from forces more than twice the size of the Volunteers. Kornilov was killed when an artillery shell hit the farmhouse where he had set up headquarters. Some accounts have characterised this event as "very bad luck" because the shell had hit the room that Kornilov was and killed him but did not injure anybody else in the building.

He was succeeded in command by Denikin, who decided to abandon the assault after five days of fighting and to withdraw to the north. Hearing of the death of Kornilov, Vladimir Lenin told the Moscow Soviet, "It can be said with certainty that, in the main, the civil war has ended".

On the evening of 13 April, the Volunteer Army's forced march began in order to save the demoralised army, and large Red forces were avoided. Denikin left 211 of his severely wounded, with doctors and nurses, at Yelizavetinskaya, Dyadkovskaya, and Ilyinskaya. By the beginning of May, the army had made it back to the border of the Don. According to Kenez, "The Ice March had ended. The Army, which had started the march with four thousand soldiers, had five thousand at the end of the campaign. But the greatest achievement of the march was simply survival".

== Aftermath ==
The campaign inspired hope in the volunteers and showed that the White Army could resist in a huge disparity of forces, just as the Steppe March was later used to raise the moral component of the troops.

The Volunteer Army established its headquarters in Mechetinskaya and Yegorlykskaya. It established contact with Ataman Pyotr Krasnov, who agreed to support the Volunteer Army with weapons and money and to take on the sick and the wounded. In June, Alekseyev established a political department in Novocherkassk, and Denikin published his "Goals of the Army". The points included that "the Germans must withdraw from the territory of Russia; the Bolsheviks must capitulate and be disarmed..."

== Memory ==
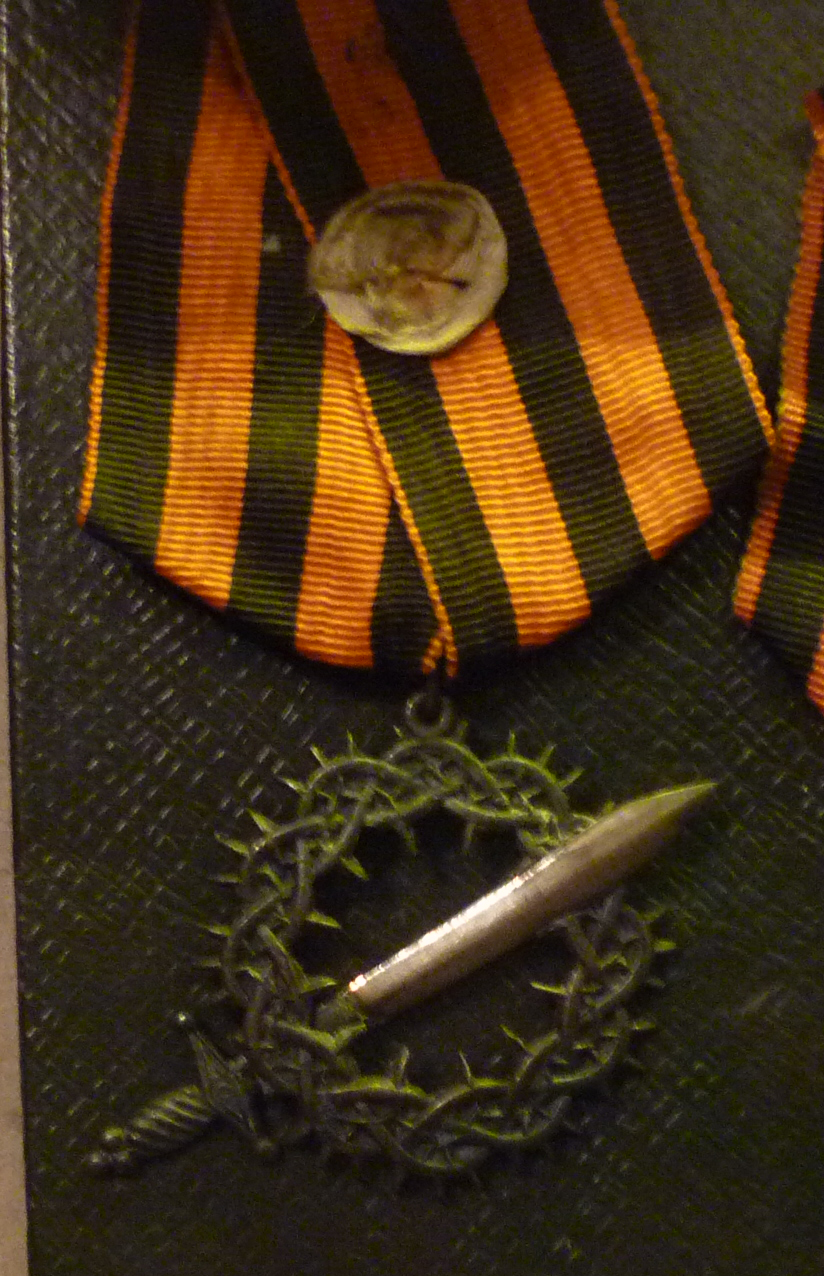
Badge of the First Kuban Campaign

All those who survived the First Kuban Campaign were referred to as pervopokhodniki (Russian: первопоходники, lit. 'first-campaigners') and were awarded the First Kuban Campaign Badge in memory of their courage and martyrdom.

== See also ==
- Bibliography of the Russian Revolution and Civil War
- Outline of the Russian Revolution and Civil War
- Index of articles related to the Russian Revolution and Civil War
- The "Russian" Civil Wars, 1916–1926: Ten Years That Shook the World
- Russia in Flames: War, Revolution, Civil War, 1914–1921
- Russia in Revolution: An Empire in Crisis, 1890 to 1928
- Russia: Revolution and Civil War, 1917—1921
- The Russian Revolution: A New History
