= Rudolf Sivers =

Russian revolutionary (1892–1918)

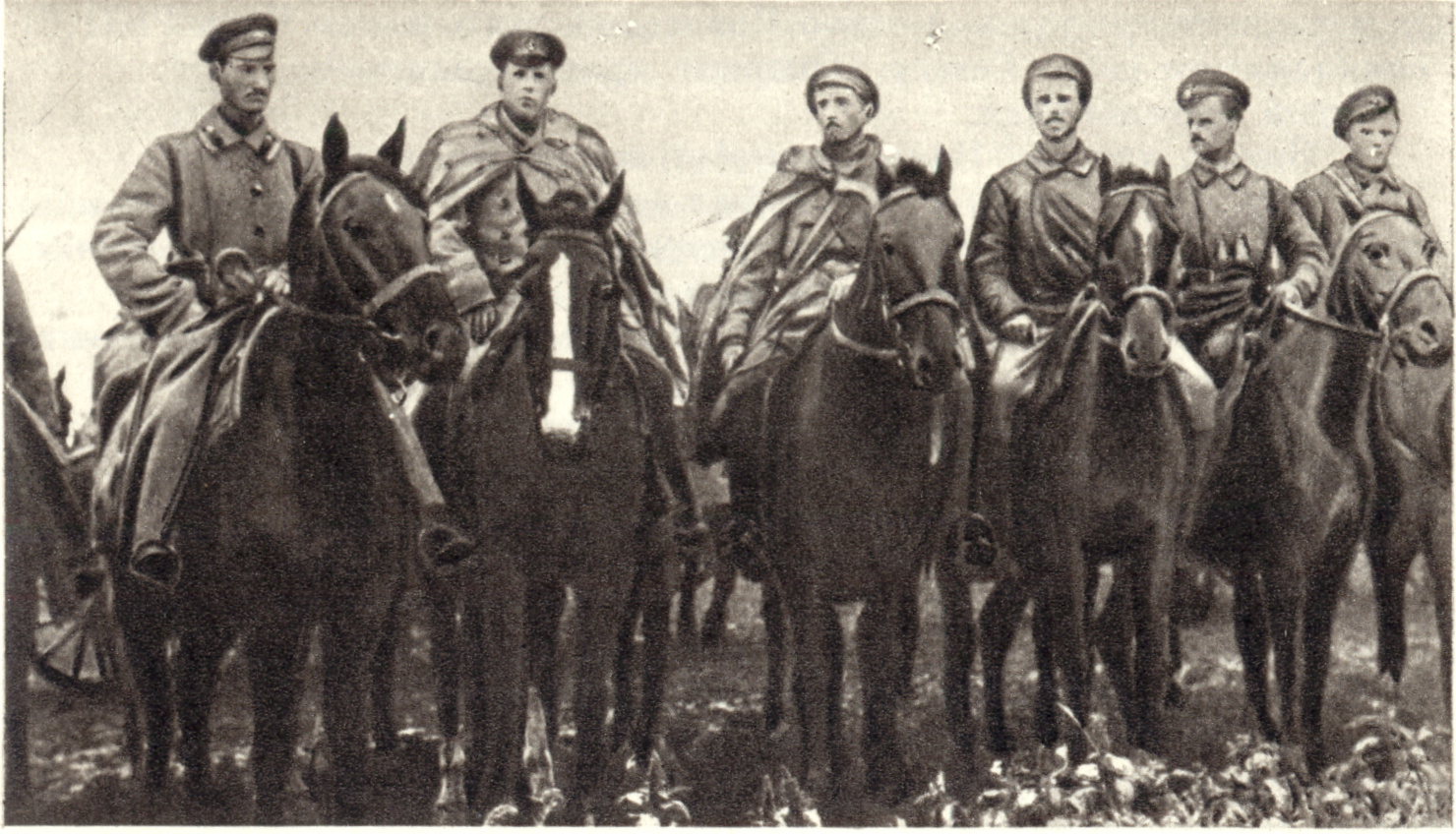
Red Guards detachment along with Sivers, 1918

Rudolf Ferdinandovich Sivers (Russian: Рудольф Фердинандович Сиверс; 23 November 1892 – 8 December 1918) was a Russian revolutionary and military leader.

== Life ==
Sivers was born in Saint Petersburg on 23 November 1892.

A veteran of World War I, after the February Revolution he joined Bolshevik party and became a chief editor of "Entrenched Truth" newspaper in the 12th Army. At the end of July 1917, he was arrested by the Russian Provisional Government for defeatism, but was released during the October Revolution.

At the start of the Russian Civil War, Sivers led Red Guards and sailors in the battle at Pulkovo against forces of Krasnov–Kerensky. Soon thereafter in November 1917 along with his troops he was dispatched to Ukraine and the South Russia (Don River region). On 23 February 1918, Sivers' forces occupied Rostov-na-Donu and then Taganrog. In March – April 1918 Sivers was put in charge of the 2nd Special Army (originally the 5th Army) and fought against the advancing forces of Central Powers near Kharkov and Kupyansk despite the Treaty of Brest-Litovsk. The army was eventually merged with the Voronezh Detachment.

From the summer of 1918, Sivers fought at the Russian Southern Frontand commanded the 1st Special Ukrainian Brigade as part of the 9th Army against the forces of Pyotr Krasnov. On 15 November 1918, he was mortally wounded in battle near Zhelnovka (now Zhelunovo, Karachevsky District) and died on 8 December 1918. Sivers was buried at the Monument to the Fighters of the Revolution on the Field of Mars in Saint Petersburg.
