= Mikhail Alekseyev =

Russian general of infantry (1857–1918)

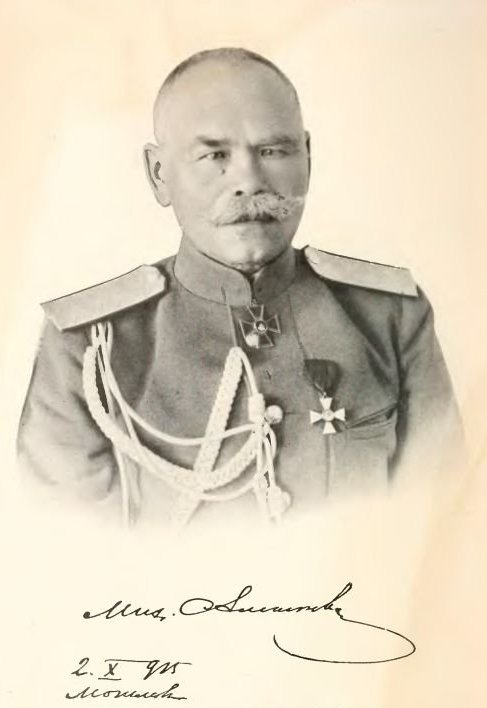
- Alekseyev in 1915
- Born: 15 November 1857; Vyazma, Smolensk Governorate, Russian Empire
- Died: 8 October 1918 (aged 60); Ekaterinodar, Russian SFSR
- Burial place: New Cemetery, Belgrade
- Military career
- Allegiance: Russian Empire; Russian Republic
- Branch: (Russian Empire) Imperial Russian Army (Russian Republic) Volunteer Army
- Service years: 1876–1918
- Rank: General of Infantry
- Conflicts: Russo-Turkish War; Russo-Japanese War; World War I Russian Civil War
- Awards: Order of St. Stanislav; Order of St. George; Order of St. Vladimir; Order of St. Anne

Mikhail Vasilyevich Alekseyev (Russian: Михаил Васильевич Алексеев) (15 November [O.S. 3 November] 1857 – 8 October [O.S. 25 September] 1918) was an Imperial Russian Army general during World War I and the Russian Civil War. Between 1915 and 1917, he served as Tsar Nicholas II's Chief of Staff of the Stavka, and after the February Revolution, was its commander-in-chief under the Russian Provisional Government from March to May 1917. He later played a principal role in founding the Volunteer Army in the Russian Civil War and died in 1918 of heart failure while fighting the Bolsheviks in the Volga region.

== Biography ==
Alekseyev was born in Vyazma, in the Smolensk Governorate of the Russian Empire (present-day Smolensk Oblast, Russia). His father, Vasili Alekseyev, was an army captain in the 64th Kazan Regiment from a modest background. In 1873 Alekseyev entered as a volunteer in the 2nd Grenadiers Regiment in Rostov. He graduated from the Moscow Infantry School in 1876 and was commissioned an ensign in the same 64th Kazan Regiment. He served as an orderly to General Mikhail Skobelev during the Russo-Turkish War (1877–1878), and was wounded in combat near Pleven, Bulgaria. He was promoted to lieutenant in January 1881, and captain in May 1883.

In 1893, Alekseyev entered the Nicholas General Staff Academy, and in 1896 became a lecturer.

In 1890, with the rank of lieutenant colonel, he was posted as a senior adjutant in the headquarters of the 1st Army Corps in the St. Petersburg Military District. In March 1904, he was promoted to the rank of major general.

=== Russo-Japanese War ===
With the outbreak of the Russo-Japanese War, in October 1904 Alekseyev was appointed Quartermaster General of the Russian 3rd Manchurian Army. During the war he was awarded a gold sword, the Order of St. Stanislav, and the Order of St. Anne.

After the war, he returned to the General Staff Academy as a Professor of the history of military science.

In 1908 he was made Chief of Staff of the Kiev Military District and promoted to lieutenant general. In 1912 Alekseyev was given command of the 13th Army Corps.

=== World War I ===
The beginning of World War I saw Alekseyev appointed Chief of Staff to N. I. Ivanov, Commander of the Southwestern Front (which held the Third, Fourth, Fifth, and Eighth Armies), where he planned the Russian offensive into Galicia with the rank of General-of-Infantry. He was subsequently awarded the Order of St. George (4th class). In March 1915 Alekseyev became the overall commander of the Russian Northwestern Front.

On 5 September 1915, when Grand Duke Nicholas Nikolayevich of Russia stepped down as Russian supreme Commander-in-chief in August 1915 to be replaced by Tsar Nicholas II, Alekseyev was appointed as Chief of Staff of the General Headquarters (Stavka) and placed in charge of all military operations. He served in this capacity from August 1915 to March 1917.

In his capacity as Chief of Staff, Alekseyev proved to be a more adaptable and flexible commander than his predecessor. He was, however, incapable of changing a political system that allowed the promotion of incompetent commanders through nepotism, patronage and the use of court intrigue. Alekseyev remained committed to the Allied cause of the Entente, which is proved by the undertaking of the summer offensive in 1916. However, the Russian Army did not manage to exploit strategic benefits of the successful offensive and the situation at the front did not improve significantly.

=== Russian Civil War ===
During the February Revolution of 1917, Alexeyev forwarded telegrams to the Tsar from the generals commanding the front, advising him to abdicate the throne. These telegrams led to the Tsar's decision to abdicate on the 15 March 1917 in favour of his brother Grand Duke Michael.

From March to May 1917, Alekseyev's position remained ambiguous. While he was the Commander-in-chief and later adviser to the Provisional Government, he spoke out against the Soviets and the democratization of the army. On 30 August 1917 Alekseyev became Chief of Staff of the Stavka under Commander-in-Chief Alexander Kerensky. His goal was to prevent the Kornilov movement (see Kornilov Affair) from developing into civil war. That same day, Alekseyev arrived at the General Headquarters, arrested General Lavr Kornilov and his men and sent them to prison in Bykhov (a town in Mogilev oblast in Belarus), from which they would "break away" with the help of General Nikolai Dukhonin.

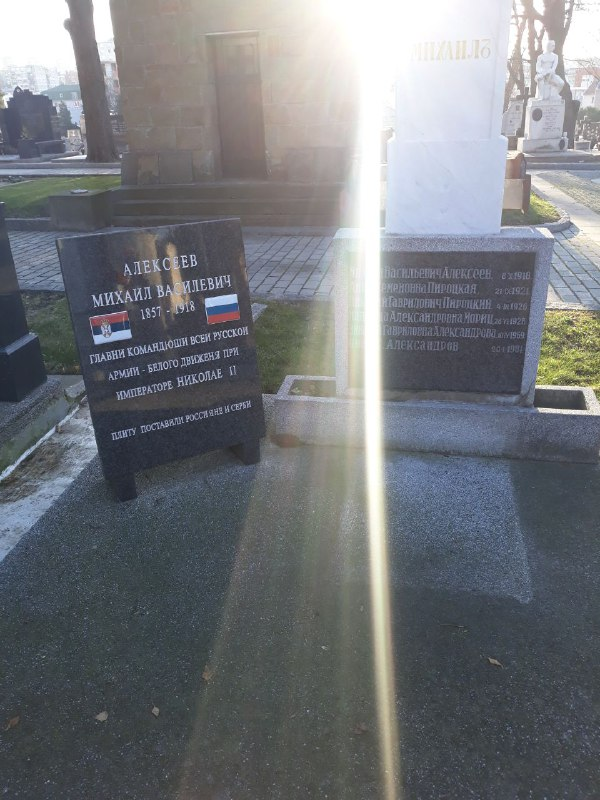
Alekseyev's grave at the New Cemetery, Belgrade.

On 13 November, after the October Revolution, Alekseyev fled Petrograd, arriving Novocherkassk on 15 Nov. With the support of the Don Cossacks Ataman, General Alexey Kaledin, he formed the Alekseev Organization, which would become the core of the anti-Bolshevik Volunteer Army.

On 19 December, he was joined by Kornilov. According to Peter Kenez, "As Denikin remarks, it was obvious from the first moment that cooperation between Alekseev and Kornilov would not be easy. Their backgrounds, personalities, and followers were very different, their past associations had left bitter memories, and they disliked each other." On 31 December, Kornilov took military command of the Volunteer Army, while Alekseyev took responsibility for civil authority, foreign affairs and finances. Kaledin had responsibility for the government of the Don district. After the death of Kornilov, Alexeyev appointed Denikin commander of the Volunteer Army, successfully completing the Ice March. In June, Alekseyev set up a political office in Novocherkassk.

However, Alekseyev, sick for some time, died of heart failure in Ekaterinodar in September 1918. He was first buried in the crypt of the Cossack host cathedral, but his family moved his remains to the New Cemetery, Belgrade, where they remain to this day.

== Awards ==
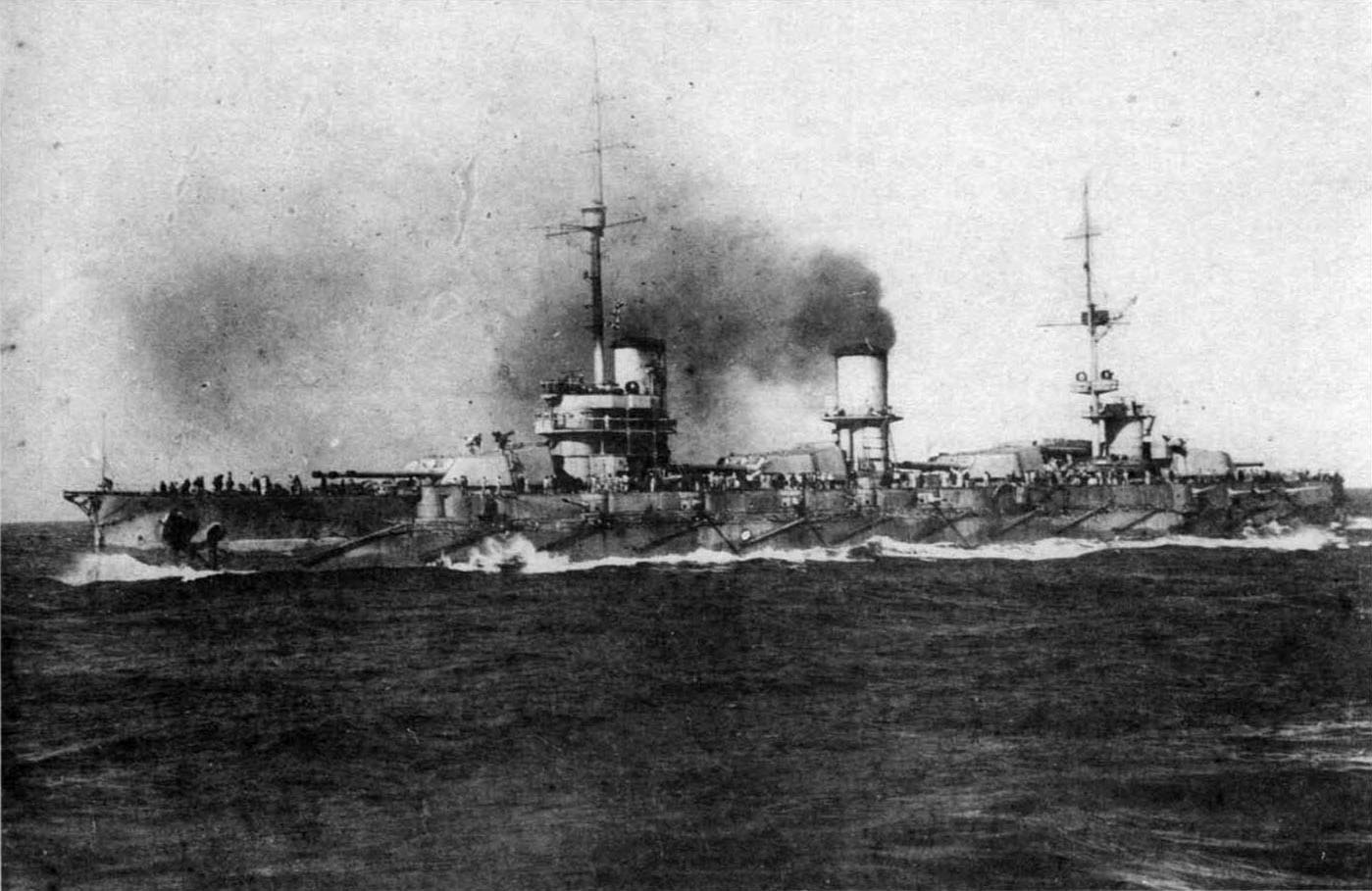
Battleship General Alekseyev of the white fleet was named after Alekseyev.

- Order of St. Anne Grade 4 "for courage" (1878)
- Order of St. Stanislav Grade 3, with swords and bow (1879)
- Order of St. Anne Grade 3, with swords and bow (1879)
- Order of St. Stanislav Grade 2 (1892)
- Order of St. Anne Grade 2 (1896)
- Order of St. Vladimir 4 degrees, with swords and bow (1900)
- Order of St. Vladimir Grade 3 (1901)
- Order of St. Stanislav Grade 1 with Swords (1905)
- Golden Sword of St. George "for courage" (1906)
- Order of St. Anne Grade 1 (1906)
- Order of St. Vladimir Grade 2 (1911)
- Order of St. George Grade 4 (1914)

== See also ==
- White movement
- Russian Civil War
