= Lavr Kornilov =

Imperial Russian Army general (1870–1918)

- Лавр Георгиевич Корнилов
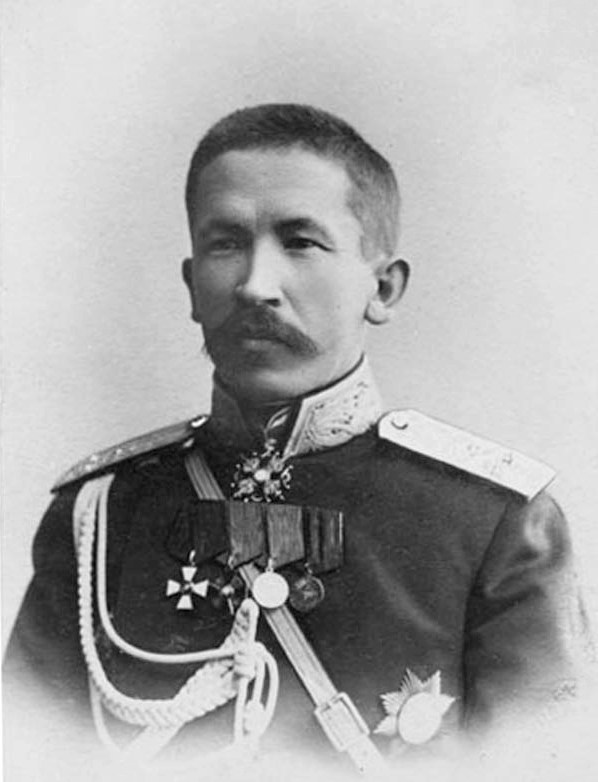
- Photograph, circa 1908
- Born: Lavr Georgiyevich Kornilov; 30 August 1870; Ust-Kamenogorsk, Semirechye Oblast, Russian Turkestan, Russian Empire
- Died: 13 April 1918 (aged 47) near Yekaterinodar, Russian SFSR
- Military career
- Allegiance: Russian Empire (1892–1917) (Russia) White Movement (1917–1918)
- Branch: Imperial Russian Army (Russia) White Army
- Service years: 1892–1918
- Rank: General of the Infantry
- Commands: Black Sea Fleet (1916–1917); Russian Army (1917–1918)
- Conflicts: Russo-Japanese War; Battle of Sandepu; Battle of Mukden; World War I; Battle of Galicia; Carpathian Campaign; Kerensky Offensive; Russian Revolution; Kornilov Affair; Russian Civil War; Ice March †
- Awards: Order of St. George (twice); Order of Saint Anna; Order of Saint Stanislaus

Lavr Georgiyevich Kornilov (Russian: Лавр Георгиевич Корнилов, IPA: [ˈla͡ʊv ɡʲɪˈorɡʲɪjɪvʲɪtɕ kɐrˈnʲiləf]; 30 August [O.S. 18 August] 1870 – 13 April 1918) was a Russian military intelligence officer, explorer, and general in the Imperial Russian Army during World War I. He served as Supreme Commander of the Russian Army and as the military leader of the Whites in the Russian Civil War. He is particularly remembered for the Kornilov Affair, an unsuccessful coup d’etat against the Provisional Government led by Alexander Kerensky. The event became a significant turning point in the Russian Revolution, strengthening the Bolsheviks' position and influence.

Born in Ust-Kamenogorsk, Kornilov began his military career after graduating from the Mikhailovsky Artillery School and the General Staff Academy. He distinguished himself during the Russo-Japanese War and later served as a military attaché in Qing China. During World War I, Kornilov commanded the 48th Infantry Division and gained recognition for his daring escape from Austrian captivity in 1915. His successes on the Eastern Front elevated him to prominence, leading to his appointment as Supreme Commander during the revolutionary upheaval of 1917.

After the Bolshevik seizure of power in November 1917, Kornilov emerged as a key figure in the White movement. Following his escape from detention after the Kornilov Affair, he co-founded the Volunteer Army and led its forces in southern Russia during the early stages of the Russian Civil War. Kornilov was killed in 1918 during the siege of Yekaterinodar by a Soviet shell. His legacy remains deeply contested, viewed by some as a patriot fighting for Russia's unity and by others as a reactionary figure whose actions exacerbated the nation’s descent into chaos.

== Pre-revolutionary career ==
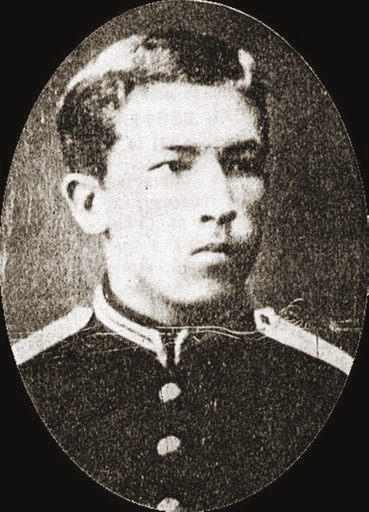
Kornilov as a teenager

One story relates how Kornilov was originally born as a Don Cossack Kalmyk named Lavga Deldinov and adopted in Ust-Kamenogorsk, Russian Turkestan (now Kazakhstan) by the family of his mother's brother, the Russian Cossack Khorunzhiy Georgy Nikolayevich Kornilov, whose wife was of Kazakh origin. But his sister wrote that he had not been adopted, had not been a Don Cossack, and that their mother had Polish and Altai Oirot descent. (Though their language was not a Kalmyk/Mongolian one, but because of their Asian race and their history in the Jungar Oirot (Kalmyk) state, Altai Oirots were called Altai Kalmyks by Russians. They were not Muslims or Kazakhs.) But Boris Shaposhnikov, who served with Pyotr Kornilov, the brother of Lavr, in 1903, mentioned the "Kyrgyz" ancestry of their mother—this name was usually used in reference to Kazakhs in 1903. Kornilov's Siberian Cossack father was a friend of Grigory Potanin (1835–1920), a prominent figure in the Siberian autonomy movement.

Kornilov entered military school in Omsk in 1885 and went on to study at the Mikhailovsky Artillery School in St. Petersburg in 1889. In August 1892 he was assigned as a lieutenant to the Turkestan Military District, where he led several exploration missions in Eastern Turkestan, Afghanistan and Persia, learned several Central Asian languages, and wrote detailed reports about his observations.

Kornilov returned to St. Petersburg to attend the Nikolayev General Staff Academy and graduated as a captain in 1897. Again refusing a posting at St. Petersburg, he returned to the Turkestan Military District, where he resumed his duties as a military intelligence officer. Among his missions at this post was an attempt at traveling incognito to British India in 1904, though he was quickly discovered and subsequently kept under close surveillance.

During the Russo-Japanese War of 1904–1905 Kornilov became the chief of staff of the 1st Infantry Brigade, and was heavily involved in the Battle of Sandepu (January 1905) and the Battle of Mukden (February/March 1905). He was awarded the Order of St. George (4th class) for bravery and promoted to the rank of colonel.

Following the end of the war, Kornilov served as military attache in China from 1907 to 1911. He studied the Chinese language, travelled extensively (researching data on the history, traditions and customs of the Chinese, which he intended to use as material for a book about life in contemporary China), and regularly sent detailed reports to the General Staff and Foreign Ministry. Kornilov paid much attention to the prospects of cooperation between Russia and China in the Far East and met with the future president of China, Chiang Kai-shek. In 1910 Kornilov was recalled from Beijing but remained in St. Petersburg for only five months before departing for western Mongolia and Kashgar to examine the military situation along China's border with Russia. On 2 February 1911 he became Commander of the 8th Estonian Infantry Regiment and was later appointed commander of the 9th Siberian Rifle Division, stationed in Vladivostok.

In 1914, at the start of World War I, Kornilov was appointed commander of the 48th Infantry Division, which saw combat in Galicia and the Carpathians. In 1915, he was promoted to the rank of major general. During heavy fighting, he was captured by the Austrians in April 1915, when his division became isolated from the rest of the Russian forces. After his capture, Field Marshal Conrad von Hötzendorf, the commander of the Austro-Hungarian Army, made a point of meeting him in person. As a major general, he was a high-value prisoner of war, but in July 1916 Kornilov managed to escape back to Russia and return to duty.

After the abdication of Tsar Nicholas II, he was given command of the Petrograd Military District in March 1917. On 8 March, Kornilov placed the Empress Alexandra and her children under house arrest at the Alexander Palace (Nicholas was still held at Stavka), replacing the Tsar's Escort and Combined Regiments of the Imperial Guard with 300 revolutionary troops. On 21 April, when the Provisional Government declined to give him the authority he sought to deal with protestors in Petrograd, he resigned as commander of the Petrograd district and was transferred at his request to command the Russian Eighth Army. During the Kerensky Offensive, his army inflicted a spectacular defeat on the Austrians, taking 10,000 prisoners—Russia's only notable military success in the year 1917—though after five days, was forced to retreat. On 24 July, he was appointed commander of the southern front. A week later, he replaced Aleksei Brusilov as Supreme Commander-in-Chief of the Provisional Government's armed forces.

== Kornilov Affair ==
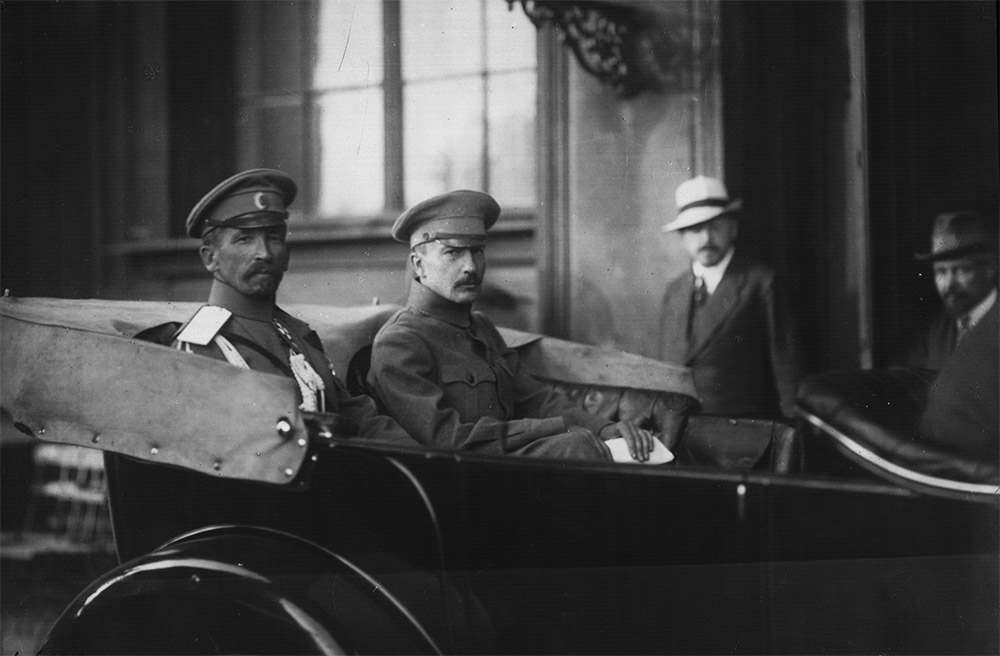
Kornilov and Deputy War Minister Boris Savinkov in Moscow on 25 August [O.S. 12 August] 1917

In the mass discontent following the July Days, the Russian populace grew highly skeptical about the Provisional Government's abilities to alleviate the economic distress and social resentment among the lower classes. Pavel Milyukov, the Kadet leader, describes the situation in Russia in late July as

"Chaos in the army, chaos in foreign policy, chaos in industry and chaos in the nationalist questions".

Kornilov, appointed commander-in-chief of the Russian army in July 1917, considered the Petrograd Soviet responsible for the breakdown in the military in recent times and believed that the Provisional Government lacked the power and confidence to dissolve the Petrograd Soviet. Following several ambiguous correspondences between Kornilov and Alexander Kerensky, Kornilov commanded an assault on the Petrograd Soviet.

Because the Petrograd Soviet was able to quickly gather a powerful army of workers and soldiers in defence of the Revolution, Kornilov's coup was an abysmal failure, and he was placed under arrest. The Kornilov Affair resulted in significantly increased distrust among Russians towards the Provisional Government.

== Russian Civil War ==
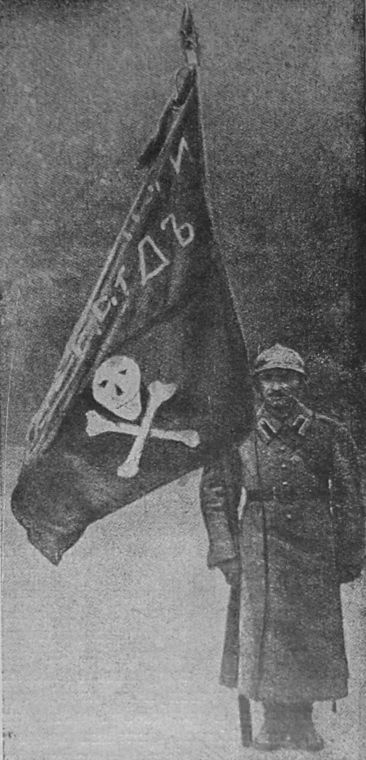
Kornilov Shock Detachment flag bearer, 1917

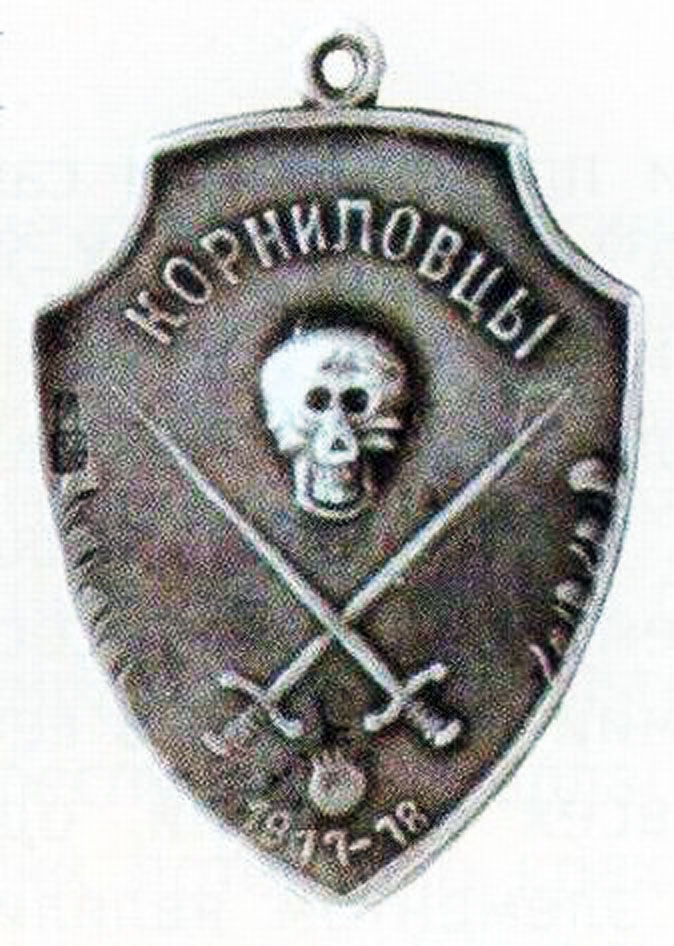
Insignia of the Kornilov Shock Regiment

After the coup collapsed as his troops disintegrated, Kornilov and his fellow conspirators were placed under arrest in the Bykhov jail. On 19 November, a few weeks after the proclamation of Soviet power in Petrograd, they escaped from their confinement (eased by the fact that the jail was guarded by Kornilov's supporters) and made their way to the Don region, which was controlled by the Don Cossacks. Here they linked up with General Mikhail Alekseev. Kornilov became the military commander of the anti-Bolshevik Volunteer Army with Alekseev as the political chief.

The Kornilov Shock Detachment of the 8th Army was the most famous and longest-lived volunteer unit in the Russian Imperial Army. It was also the last regiment of the Russian Imperial Army and the first of the Volunteer Army. In late 1917, the Kornilov Shock Regiment, one of the crack units of the Volunteer Army, was named after him, as well as many other autonomous White Army formations, such as the Kuban Cossack Kornilov Horse Regiment. Kornilov's forces became recognizable for their Totenkopf insignia, which appeared on the regiment's flags, pennants, and soldiers' sleeve patches.

Even before the Red Army was formed, Kornilov promised, "the greater the terror, the greater our victories." He vowed that the goals of his forces must be fulfilled even if it was needed "to set fire to half the country and shed the blood of three-quarters of all Russians." In the Don region village of Lezhanka alone, bands of Kornilov's officers killed more than 500 people. On the other hand, Kornilov's adjutant recalled that the general "loved only the [Russia] itself" and served it for all his life, having no time to think about political systems. The Bolsheviks for him were dangerous traitors, who ruined Russia's unity and had to be stopped.

On 24 February 1918, as Rostov and the Don Cossack capital of Novocherkassk fell to the Bolsheviks, Kornilov led the Volunteer Army on the 'Ice March' into the empty steppe towards the Kuban. Although badly outnumbered, he escaped destruction from the pursuing Bolshevik forces and laid siege to then Yekaterinodar, now Krasnodar the capital of the Kuban Soviet Republic, on 10 April. However, in the early morning of 13 April, a Soviet shell landed on his farmhouse headquarters and killed him. He was quietly buried in nearby Gnadau (modern day Dolinovskoe).

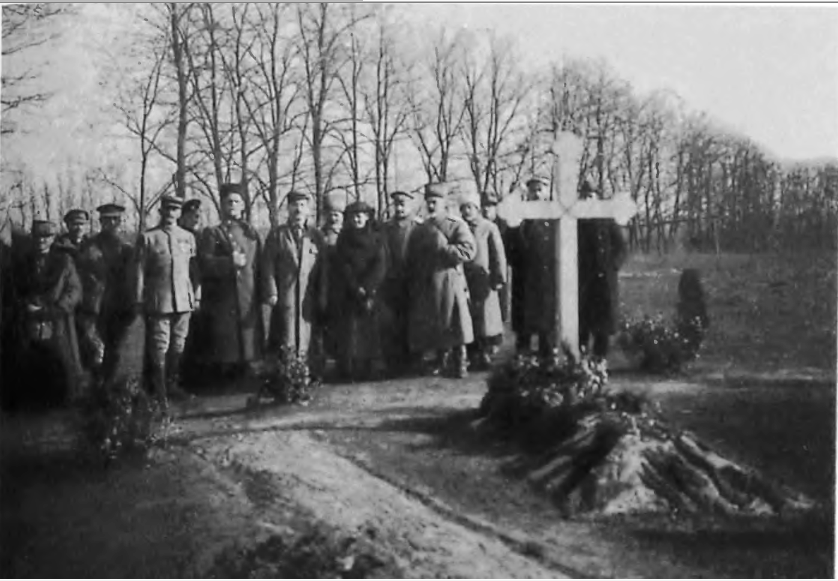
Kornilov's grave, prior to its desecration by the Bolsheviks.

A few days later, when the Bolsheviks gained control of the village, they unearthed Kornilov's coffin, dragged his corpse to the main square and burnt his remains on the local rubbish dump.

== Memorials ==
On 13 April 2013, a monument to Kornilov was erected in Krasnodar. Commemoration ceremonies took place with local Cossacks, along with Cossacks from Don, Stavropol, and Taman.

== Honours and awards ==
- Order of St. Stanislaus, third degree (1901), 2nd degree (1904 and 1906 with swords)
- Order of St. Anne, 3rd degree (1903) and 2nd degree (6 December 1909)
- Order of St. George, 4th degree (9 August 1905) and 3rd degree (28 April 1915)
- Gold Sword for Bravery (9 May 1907)
- Badge of the 1st Kuban (Ice) campaign (3 October 1918), issued posthumously, No.1 out of 3,689
