= Volunteer Army =

White army during the Russian Civil War

Volunteer Army Добровольческая армия (pre-1918 Russian) Добровольческая армія
- Insignia
- Active: November 1917 – March 1920
- Allegiance: (Russia) VSYuR
- Branch: Armed Forces of South Russia (from 8 January 1919)
- Size: 3,000 (December 1917); 3,348 (February 1918); 8,500–9,000 (June 1918); 40,000 (June 1919); 5,000 (March 1920)
- Nickname: White Guard
- Engagements: Russian Civil War: Southern Front; Ice March; Second Kuban Campaign; Battle for the Donbas; Battle of Tsaritsyn; Advance on Moscow; Third Battle of Kiev; Ukrainian War of Independence; First Battle of Kiev; Battle of Peregonovka

Commanders
- Notable commanders: Mikhail Drozdovsky †; Anton Denikin; Pyotr Wrangel; Mikhail Alekseyev; Lavr Kornilov †; Vladimir May-Mayevsky; Alexander Kutepov

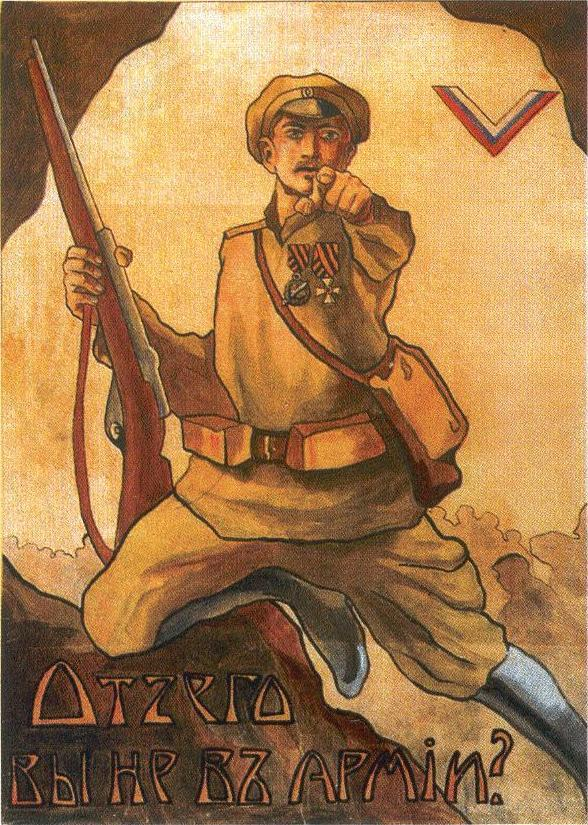
"Why aren't you in the army?" Volunteer Army recruitment poster during the Russian Civil War.

The Volunteer Army (Russian: Добровольческая армия, romanized: Dobrovolcheskaya armiya; pre-1918 Russian: Добровольческая армія), abbreviated to Добрармия, Dobrarmiya (pre-1918 Russian: Добрармія), also known as the Southern White Army, was a White Army active in South Russia during the Russian Civil War from 1917 to 1920. The Volunteer Army fought against Bolsheviks and Makhnovists on the Southern Front, and against forces of the Ukrainian People's Republic during the Ukrainian War of Independence. On 8 January 1919, it was made part of the Armed Forces of South Russia, becoming the largest force of the White movement until it was merged with the Army of Wrangel in March 1920.

== History ==
=== Formation ===
The Volunteer Army began forming in November/December 1917 under the leadership of General Mikhail Alekseyev and General Lavr Kornilov in Novocherkassk, shortly after the Russian Civil War began following the October Revolution. It organized to fight against the Bolsheviks in southern Russia. Alekseyev and Kornilov enlisted supporters, who initially included volunteering officers, cadets, students, and Cossacks. Of the first 3,000 recruits, only twelve were ordinary soldiers; the rest were officers, some of whom resented having to serve as privates.

==== Official creation ====
On December 27, 1917 (N.S. January 9, 1918), the creation of the Volunteer Army was officially announced, with Alekseyev becoming its overall leader, Kornilov as its Commander-in-chief, General Alexander Lukomsky as its Chief of Staff, General Anton Denikin commanding the 1st Division, and General Sergey Markov as commanding 1st Officers regiment. They also created the so-called "Special Council" at the headquarters, which included prominent civilian politicians such as Peter Struve, Pavel Milyukov, Mikhail Rodzianko, Sergey Sazonov and Boris Savinkov.

=== 1918 ===
In early February 1918, the Volunteer Army numbered more than 3,600 men. It fought against the Red Army together with units of General Alexey Kaledin's forces.

==== First Kuban Campaign ====
In late February, the Red Army's advance forced the Volunteer Army to retreat from Rostov-on-Don to Kuban in order to unite with the Kuban Cossack formations, a retreat known as the Ice March. However, most Kuban Cossacks did not support the Volunteer Army, and only a small unit (3,000 men) led by General Viktor Pokrovsky joined the Volunteer Army on March 26, 1918, increasing its number to 6,000 troops. The Volunteer Army's attempt to capture Yekaterinodar between April 9–13 was a disaster, with Kornilov being killed in battle when he was hit by an artillery shell. Denikin took over command of the remnants of the Volunteer Army and left for the remote stanitsas beyond the Don River region.

==== Second Kuban Campaign ====
In June 1918, 3,000 men under Colonel Mikhail Drozdovsky's command joined the Volunteer Army, strengthening it to between 8,000 and 9,000 men. On June 23, the Volunteer Army began the Kuban Offensive, with General Pyotr Krasnov's support. By September 1918, the Volunteer Army was up to 30,000 to 35,000 men thanks to the mobilization of the Kuban Cossacks and what the Bolsheviks classified as "counterrevolutionary elements" gathered in the North Caucasus, taking the name of Caucasus Volunteer Army.

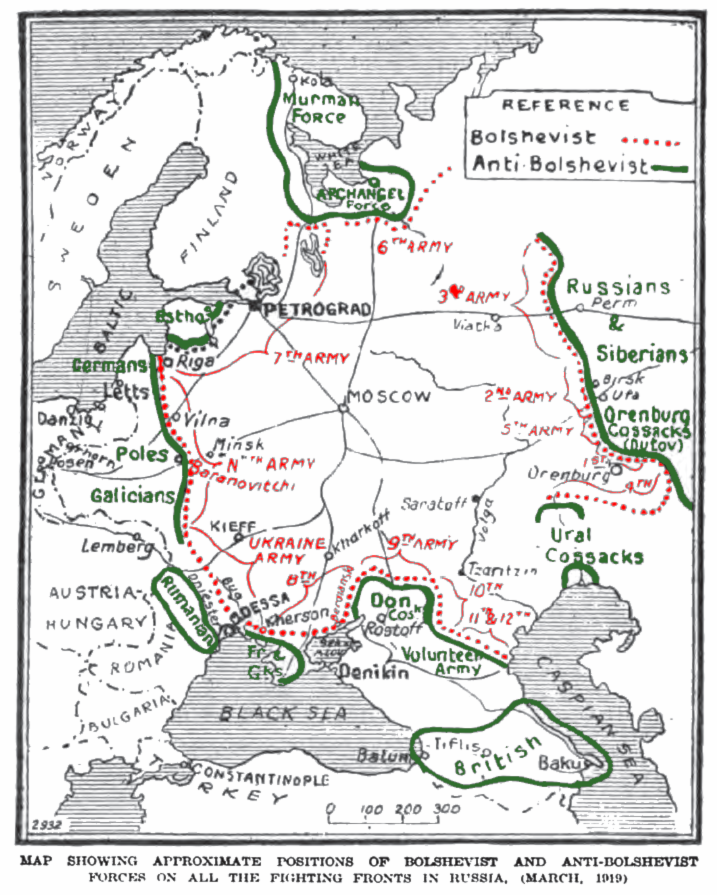
General Anton Denikin's Volunteer Army and regional armed forces after Armistice of Mudros.

In the autumn of 1918, Great Britain, France and the United States increased their material and technical assistance to the Volunteer Army. With the Entente's support, the forces of the South Russian Whites combined to form the so-called Armed Forces of South Russia (Вооружённые силы Юга России, Vooruzhenniye sily Yuga Rossii) led by Denikin. In late 1918 to early 1919, Denikin defeated the 11th Soviet Army and captured the North Caucasus region.

=== 1919 ===
In January 1919, the Caucasus Volunteer Army was divided into the Caucasus Army and the Volunteer Army, which would later be joined by the Don Army, created from the remnants of Krasnov's Cossack Army. After capturing Donbas, Tsaritsyn, and Kharkov in June 1919, Denikin began advancing towards Moscow on June 20 (July 3). According to his plan, the main blow to Moscow was to be inflicted by the Volunteer Army (40,000 men) under the command of General Vladimir May-Mayevsky.

Some of the Volunteer Army's units and formations possessed good military skills and fighting strength due to large numbers of officers in its ranks, who hated and despised the Bolsheviks. However, the Volunteer Army's fighting efficiency decreased in the summer of 1919 in light of significant losses and conscription of mobilized peasants and even captured Red Army soldiers. During the Red Army's counteroffensive in October 1919, the Volunteer Army suffered a decisive defeat and retreated south.

=== 1920 ===
In early 1920, it retreated to the areas beyond the Don region and was reduced to a corps of 5,000 men under the command of General Alexander Kutepov. On March 26 and March 27, 1920, the Volunteer Army's remnants were evacuated from Novorossiysk to the Crimea, where they merged with the Army of Wrangel under General Pyotr Wrangel.

== Nomenclature timeline ==
The term "Volunteer Army" is often used as a shorthand description for all the White Russian forces in the South Russia area, the actual names of the formation are:

- From its inception until January 1918 this formation was called the Alekseyev Organization, named after its founder Mikhail Alekseyev
- From January 1918 until January 23, 1919, this formation was named the Volunteer Army
- From January 23, 1919, until May 22, 1919, this formation was named the Caucasus Volunteer Army.
- On May 22, 1919, this formation was split into two formations:
  - Caucasus Army, disbanded on January 29, 1920, and replaced by the Kuban Army, the remnants of which surrendered on April 18–20, 1920.
  - Volunteer Army, the remnants of which were evacuated March 26/27, 1920.

== Reasons for defeat ==
The army was unable to put forward a political idea that was understandable to the majority of the population. A struggle against the Bolsheviks was proclaimed, after which the Constituent Assembly would choose a form of government suitable for Russia. This turned out to be not enough. Officers before the revolution were out of politics, so after 1917 they were simply not able to correctly assess the political struggle and organize the ideological support of volunteer units and the propaganda struggle against the Soviet government. For example, the head of the OSVAG, whose task was to promote the policy of the Volunteer Army, was appointed biologist S. Chakhotin, who was unable to wage an ideological struggle.

== See also ==
- White movement
- West Russian Volunteer Army
- Russian Civil War
- Russian Liberation Movement
- Russian Liberation Army
- Russian Corps
- Allied Intervention in the Russian Civil War
