= Kharkiv Operation (June 1919) =

Military campaign in the Russian Civil War

- Part of the Southern Front of the Russian Civil War
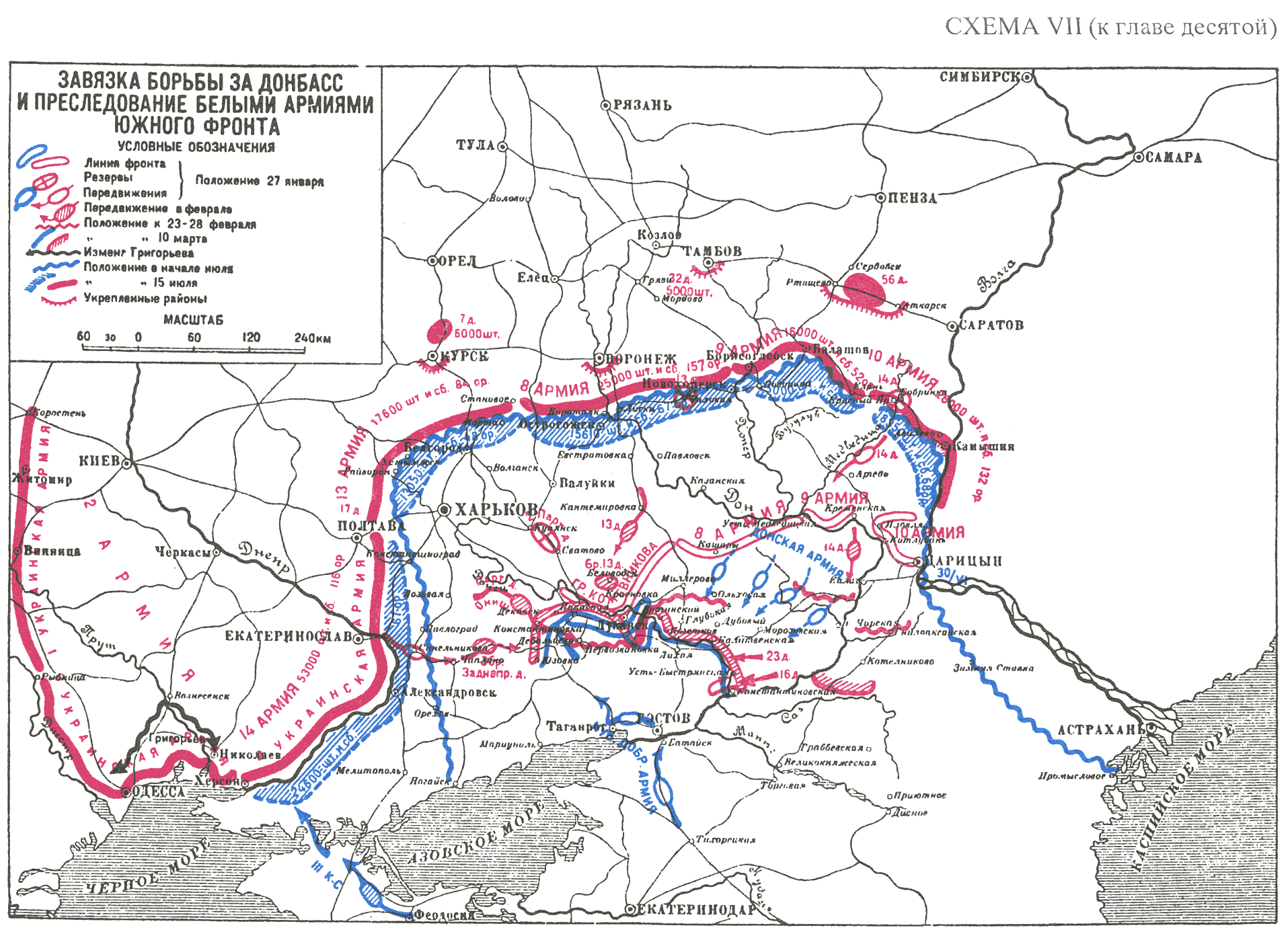
- The advance of the AFSR in Spring 1919
Date	20–25 June 1919 (5 days)
Location	Kharkiv, North-Eastern Ukraine
Result	White Army victory

Belligerents
(Russian State) 1st Army Corps (AFSR) (Russian State) Terek Division (Russian State) Volunteer Army	(Ukrainian Soviet Socialist Republic) Ukrainian Soviet Army (Russian Soviet Federative Socialist Republic) 13th Army (RSFSR)

Commanders and leaders
(Russian State) Vladimir May-Mayevsky (Russian State) Alexander Kutepov (Russian State) Sergei Toporkov (Russian State) Anton Turkul (Russian State) Andrei Shkuro	(Ukrainian Soviet Socialist Republic) Vladimir Antonov-Ovseyenko (Russian Soviet Federative Socialist Republic) Anatoliy Gekker

The Kharkiv Operation was a military campaign of the Russian Civil War in June 1919, in which White forces captured the important industrial center of Kharkiv from the Bolsheviks, in preparation for an advance on Moscow.

== The Battle ==
After months of heavy fighting in the Donbass and Don region, the Red Southern Front collapsed, allowing the Volunteer Army to launch a major attack towards the North and West. In June, the Whites undertook a successful offensive in the directions of Yekaterinoslav and Kharkiv.

By the second half of June 1919, the main forces of the Volunteer Army (most of the forces of the 1st Army and 3rd Kuban Cavalry Corps, in total 6 infantry and cavalry divisions) under the command of General Vladimir May-Mayevsky approached Kharkiv still controlled by the Red Army, and began to prepare for the assault. The main offensive on the city was developed by forces of the 1st Army Corps of General Alexander Kutepov from the south and south-east.
The city was taken after 5 days of heavy fighting.

== Results ==
As a result of the capture of Kharkiv, the Volunteer Army destroyed an important stronghold of the Red Army on its way to Kursk and Moscow. They also captured an important stock of weapons: armored cars, armored trains, machine guns and ammunition, and seized an important industrial center.
Thus, the AFSR were able to control a strategically important city, while also replenishing its resources and gaining the use of Kharkiv's industrial potential.

On July 3, Anton Denikin promulgated his Moscow Directive, marking the start of the campaign against Moscow.

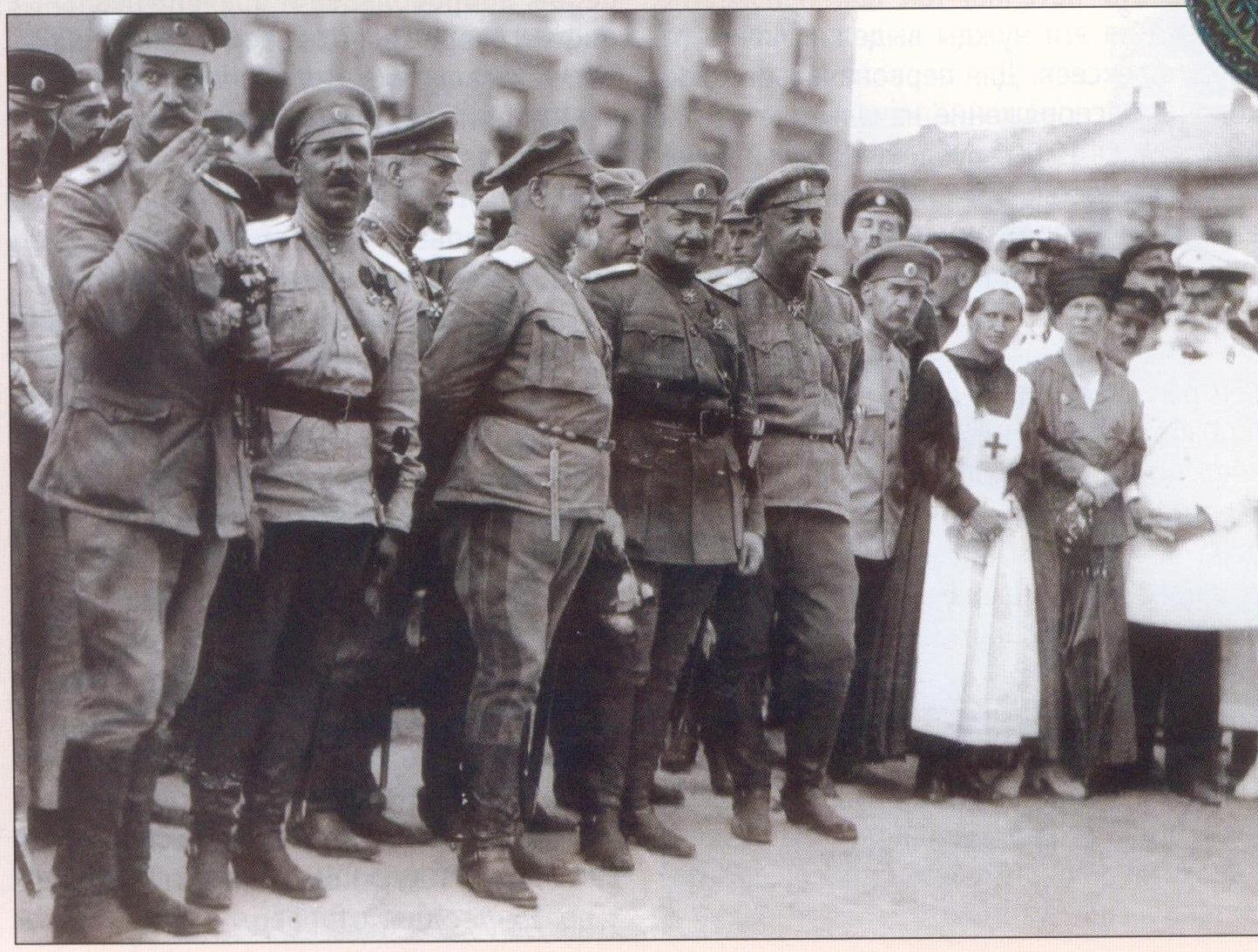
Denikin and his generals in Kharkiv, 28 June 1919.

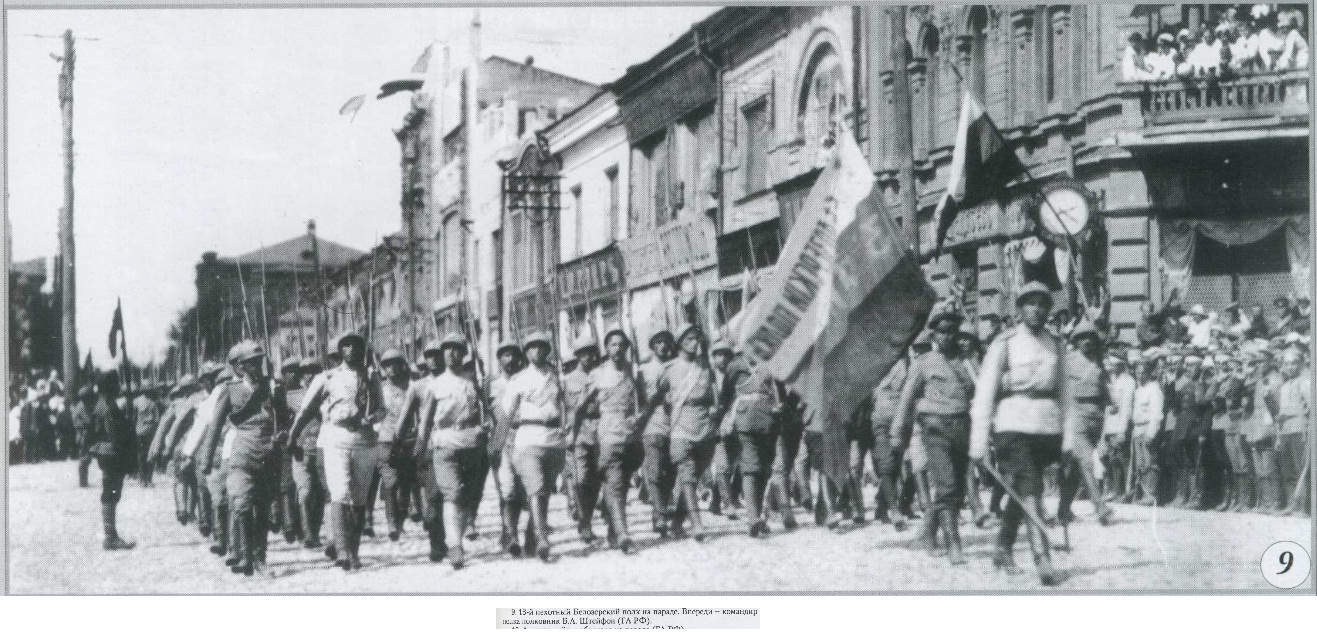
The Belozersky Regiment at the Volunteer Army parade in Kharkiv. At the head is the regiment commander, Colonel B. A. Shteifon.

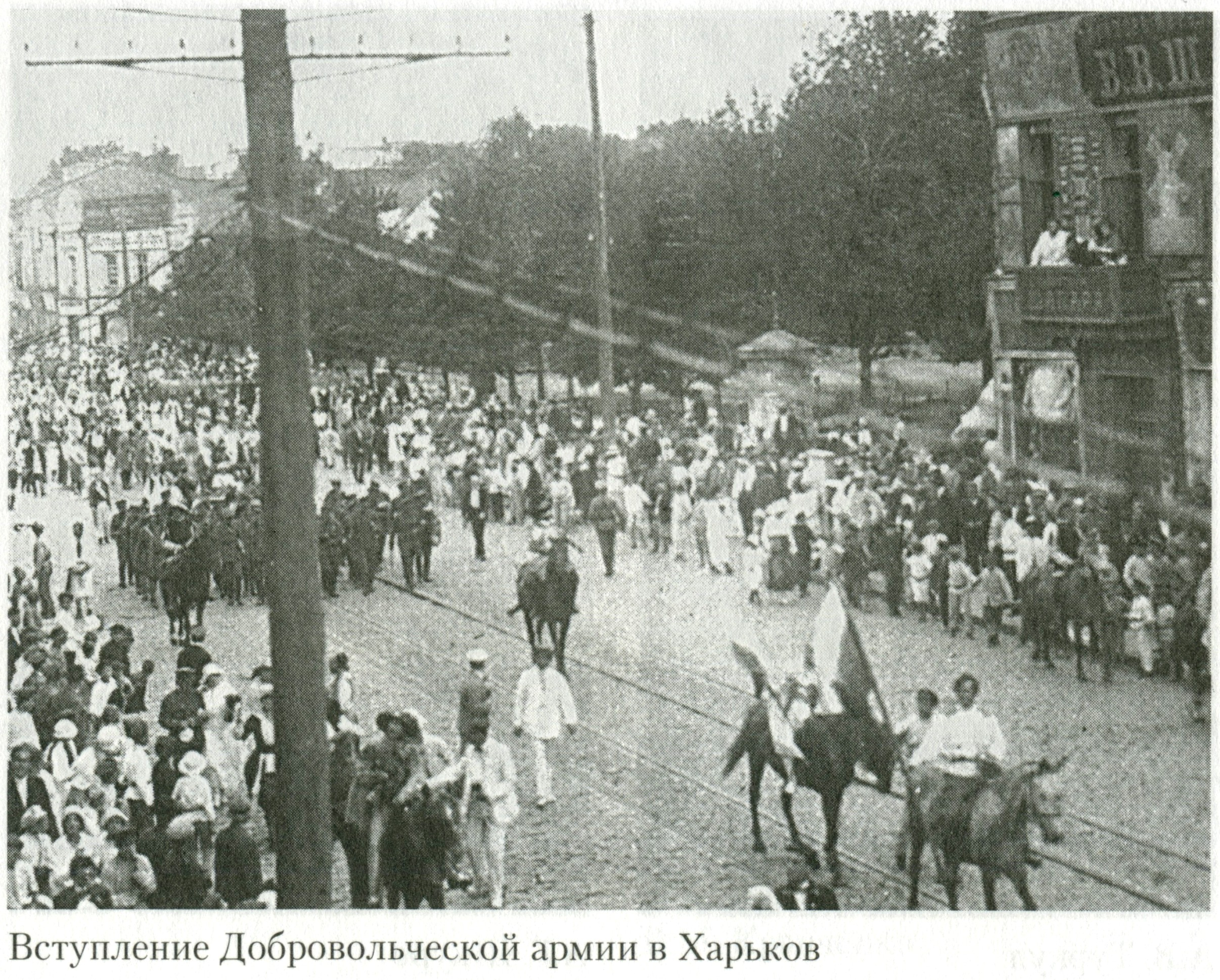
The Volunteer Army enters Kharkiv on 25 June 1919

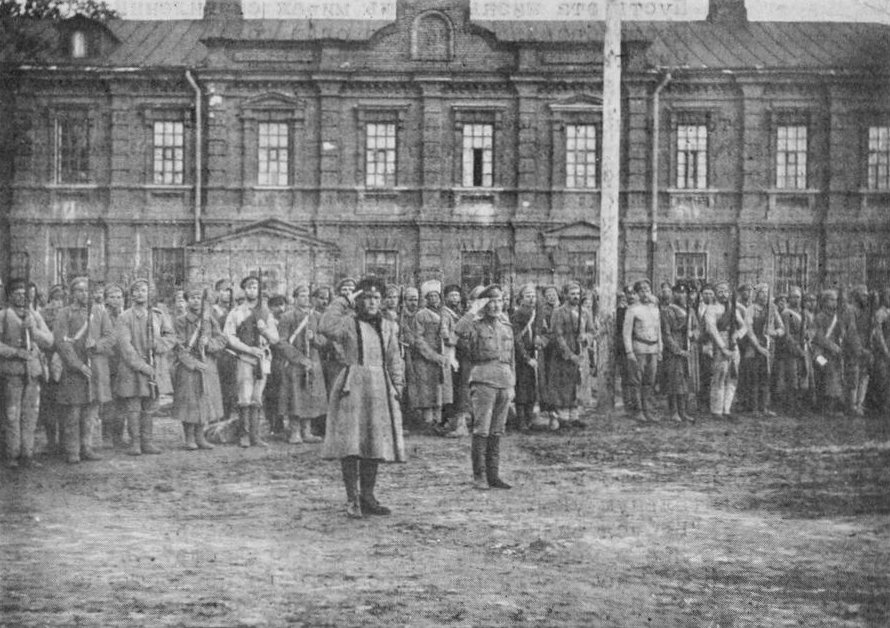
Lieutenant G. A. Golovan, commander of the reserve battalion of the 3rd Kornilov Shock Regiment, Zmiev Barracks in Kharkov.

== See also ==
- Bibliography of the Russian Revolution and Civil War
- Outline of the Russian Revolution and Civil War
- Index of articles related to the Russian Revolution and Civil War
- The "Russian" Civil Wars, 1916–1926: Ten Years That Shook the World
- Russia in Flames: War, Revolution, Civil War, 1914–1921
- Russia in Revolution: An Empire in Crisis, 1890 to 1928
- Russia: Revolution and Civil War, 1917—1921
- The Russian Revolution: A New History
