= Maria Zakharchenko-Schulz =

Russian White Movement activist (1893–1927)

Marija Zacharczenko-Szulc
- Born: December 3, 1893; Penza Oblast, Russian Empire
- Died: June 23, 1927 (aged 33); Polotsk district, Vitebsk region
- Body discovered: public figure, politician and intelligence officer
- Awards: Cross of St. George (2), Order of St. George (2)

Maria Vladislavovna Zakharchenko-Schulz (December 3, 1893 – June 23, 1927) was a political figure of the White movement. As a participant of World War I, the Civil War, and the Gallipoli campaign, she was one of the leaders of the Russian All-Military Union (ROVS) and a scout.

== Biography ==
=== Early years ===
Maria Vladislavovna Lysova was born into the family of an Active State Councillor Vladislav Gerasimovich Lysov. Her mother died shortly after giving birth. Maria spent her early years in Penza Governorate, at her family estate, and in the city of Penza, where she received a good home education. From a young age, horses were her passion. She continued her education at the Smolny Institute, graduating in 1911 with a gold medal. After graduating, she spent a year studying in Lausanne. Upon returning to her family estate, she organized the household and established a small exemplary horse-breeding farm. In 1913, she married Ivan Sergeyevich Mikhno, a participant of the Russo-Japanese War and a captain of the Semyonovsky Life Guards Regiment. The young couple settled in Saint Petersburg, on Zagorodny Prospect, house 54, where there were state apartments for officers of the regiment.

=== World War I ===
At the beginning of World War I, Mikhno, along with his regiment, departed for the front, where he was soon gravely wounded and died in his wife's arms. Three days after her husband's death, Maria gave birth to a girl. She decided to take her late husband's place at the front. With the emperor's approval, granted with the help of the Empress and her eldest daughter, Maria left her daughter in the care of relatives and, in early 1915, enlisted as a volunteer in the 3rd Elisavetgrad Hussar Regiment, a regiment of the Russian Imperial Army, whose patron was Grand Duchess Olga.

At the end of 1916, the regiment was withdrawn from the front for rest and, by late January 1917, was stationed in Bessarabia. It was there that the February Revolution caught up with them.

=== Revolution and Civil War ===
The Elisavetgrad Regiment remained one of the few units of the Russian Army that was not affected by disintegration. The hussars maintained discipline, and relations between officers and enlisted men stayed within the bounds of regulations. However, by the end of 1917, following the October Revolution, the regiment's personnel disbanded and returned home.

Upon returning to her homeland, Maria discovered that her estate and horse farm had been devastated. In the city of Penza, mobs were looting shops, while in the villages, peasants were burning manor houses and killing landowners. Maria organized a "Self-Defense Union" and a partisan detachment composed of local Penza students to protect private property in the Penza district. Memoirists Roman Gul and Staff Captain Arkhipov reported that Maria's detachment exacted brutal revenge on peasants whose villages had participated in the destruction of estates, burning peasant huts in retaliation. However, later researchers suggest that Maria's units never completed their formation and did not participate in any significant actions.

Maria's real contribution was aiding former officers in escaping Penza to join the White Army. With the help of an elderly maid, she sheltered former officers in her home, provided them with documents, and facilitated their journey to the Whites. This marked her first experience in underground resistance against the Bolsheviks. During this time, she reconnected with a long-time acquaintance, Grigory Zakharchenko, an officer from the 15th Uhlan Regiment. In the spring of 1918, he became her second husband. Wounded, he sought refuge in Maria's home, where they grew close. When Maria's activities came under Bolshevik scrutiny, the couple was forced to flee to the Whites.

Grigory Zakharchenko managed to obtain documents identifying them as Persian nationals. Disguised as "Persians," the Zakharchenko couple embarked on a journey from Moscow through Astrakhan to the Middle East. According to one version, they traveled through Mesopotamia, occupied by the British, and reached Armenia via a sea route through the Persian Gulf and the Suez Canal. Another version suggests their journey took them through India.

In 1919–1920, Marija served as a volunteer in the Armed Forces of South Russia (AFSR), joining the 15th Uhlan Regiment commanded by her husband. She became known for her bravery in battle and her ruthless treatment of prisoners, often refusing to take captives, earning her the nickname "Mad Maria." In the autumn of 1920, after burying her husband, who died from sepsis following a severe wound, Maria herself was seriously injured near Kakhovka. Early frosts compounded her gunshot wounds with frostbite. After the evacuation of Crimea, Maria found herself in the Gallipoli camp.

=== Emigration and General Kutepov's Combat Organization ===
After the Gallipoli camp, Maria initially traveled to the Kingdom of Serbs, Croats, and Slovenes, and then to Western Europe. She became probably one of the first participants in Alexander Kutepov's Combat Organization, which aimed to continue the armed struggle against Bolshevism, including through terrorist acts on Soviet territory. In both scholarly and popular literature, Maria Vladislavovna is referred to as the niece of Kutepov. Although Kutepov himself called Maria and her husband Radkovich "nephews," historians and researchers agree that this was actually just an agent's pseudonym or nickname.

In October 1923, together with her associate Captain Georgy Nikolaevich Radkovich, a former lifeguard who became her third civil husband (whom she met while in the Gallipoli camp), they crossed the Soviet-Estonian border illegally under the guise of a married couple named Schulz. They visited Petrograd and Moscow on a secret mission for General Kutepov. This was her first illegal underground visit to Soviet Russia. In the following years, she made many such illegal visits and extended stays in the USSR.

Zakharchenko-Schulz became one of the key figures in the Chekists' Operation Trest, a provocation designed to discredit and dismantle the Russian All-Military Union (ROVS) and reduce the "activism" of the White emigration. By using the Schulz couple without their knowledge, the Chekists were able to control and even direct the activities of the ROVS for a long time. Zakharchenko-Schulz was used to lure the British spy Sidney Reilly onto Soviet territory.

However, it became increasingly difficult to control the "activism" of the Kutepov militants and Zakharchenko-Schulz personally. Despite calls from the NKVD agents leading "Trest" to refrain from carrying out terrorist acts and "accumulate strength," Zakharchenko-Schulz sought to change the policy of the ROVS and personally Kutepov, whom she knew well, towards conducting active sabotage and terrorist actions against the Bolshevik leadership. She proposed the creation of the National Terrorists' Union (NTU) — an organization that would engage in terrorism on Soviet territory.

In May 1927, after the exposure of the "Trest" operation and the worsening foreign policy situation of the USSR (the rupture of British-Soviet relations and the expectation of the start of a new war), the ROVS decided to take active action and organize acts of terror on Soviet territory. Several terrorist groups crossed into the USSR illegally. One of them, headed for Moscow, was led by Zakharchenko-Schulz.

=== Death ===
On the night of June 3–4, 1927, Maria, together with Yuri Sergeevich Peters and Alexander (Eduard) Ottovich Opperput, attempted to set fire to a Chekist dormitory on Malaya Lubyanka street, house 3/6. The attempt failed, the terrorists were discovered by security before everything was prepared for the sabotage. The fuse could not be activated, and only one melinite grenade exploded, causing a fire that was easily extinguished. The terrorists, splitting up tried to flee across the western border, but the OGPU had already raised the alarm. NKVD units, the Red Army, and local civilians were mobilized for border searches and the surrounding areas. All roads were closed, and manhunts were organized. Zakharchenko-Schulz was caught near the Dretun station on the Moscow-Belarus-Baltic Railway, between Nevel and Polotsk, in the Polotsk district of Vitebsk province, 25 kilometers from Polotsk. Zakharchenko-Schulz died on June 23 (according to other sources, June 18, 1927) in a shootout with OGPU officers near the Dretun station.

== Popular culture ==
In culture, Zakharchenko-Szulc was one of the characters in the novel Dead Swell by Soviet writer Lev Nikulin, which tells the story of the Chekist operation "Trest." The role of Maria Vladislavovna in the 1967 film Operation "Trest", based on this novel, was played by Soviet theater actress Lyudmila Kasatkina.

== Literature ==
- Иванов И. Б. (2003). "Светлой памяти Марии Захарченко". Вестник РОВС (in Russian) (6–7).
- Дамаскин И. А. (2002). Мария Захарченко-Шульц (1893—1927). 100 великих (in Russian). Москва: Вече. ISBN 5-7838-0961-6.
- Рассказова Л. В. (2008). Беспрерывный подвиг. Биографический очерк-исследование о М. В. Захарченко (in Russian). Москва: Издательский дом «journalист». p. 120. ISBN 978-5-91318-005-6.
- "Русская героиня. Памяти Марии Владиславовны Захарченко-Шульц. К 25-летию со дня гибели". «Часовой» (La Sentinelle), орган связи Российского национального движения (journal) (in Russian) (320): 4–5. 1952.
- "Рассказова Л. В. Новые материалы о пензенском периоде жизни героини белых М. В. Захарченко (Лысовой)", Моя малая Родина. Материалы всероссийской научно-практической конференции (Выпуск 6) (in Russian), Степановка-Пенза, pp. 225–231, 2009
- Тюстин А. В. (2012), "ЗАХАРЧЕНКО-ШУЛЬЦ (урожденная Лысова) Мария Владиславовна (09.12.1893-23.06.1927)", Тюстин А. В., Шишкин И. С. Пензенская персоналия. Славу Пензы умножившие. Т. 1 (А-Л): [биогр. слов.] (in Russian), Пенза: ООО «Айсберг», p. 134, ISBN 978-5-94428-091-6
- Бандиты, покушавшиеся на взрыв здания ОГПУ в Москве — обнаружены // Советская Сибирь. No. 151. 6 июля 1927 yearа. Новосибирск.
- Бомбы, сделанные в Англии. Как были обнаружены бандиты-белогвардейцы // Советская Сибирь. No. 152. 7 июля 1927 yearа. Новосибирск.
