= Alexander Kutepov =

Russian military officer (1882–1930)

Alexander Pavlovich Kutepov
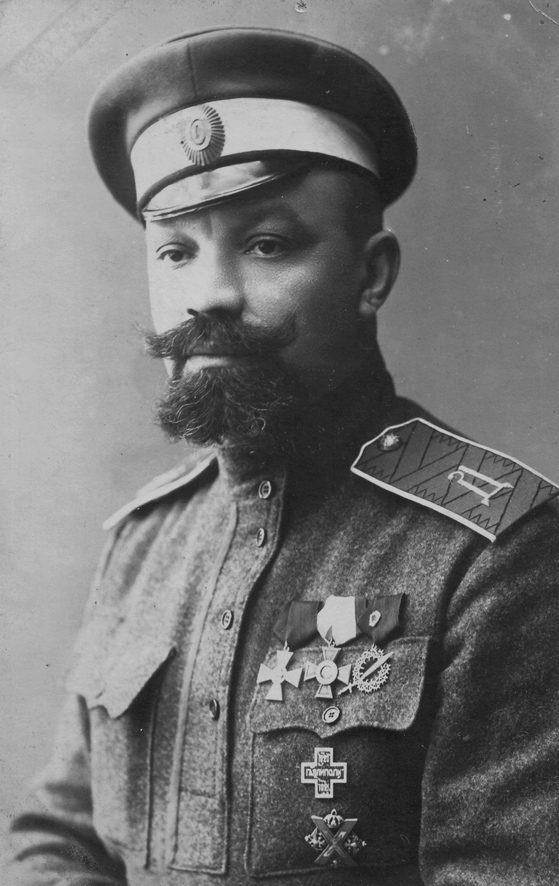
- Kutepov c.1920
- Born: 28 September 1882; Cherepovets, Novgorod Governorate, Russian Empire
- Died: 26 January 1930 (aged 47); Paris, France
- Military career
- Allegiance: Russian Empire (Russian Republic) White Movement
- Branch: Imperial Russian Army; White Army
- Service years: 1904–1920
- Rank: General of the infantry
- Commands: Preobrazhensky Regiment; Kornilov Shock Regiment; 1st Army Corps
- Conflicts: Russo-Japanese War; World War I; Russian Civil War

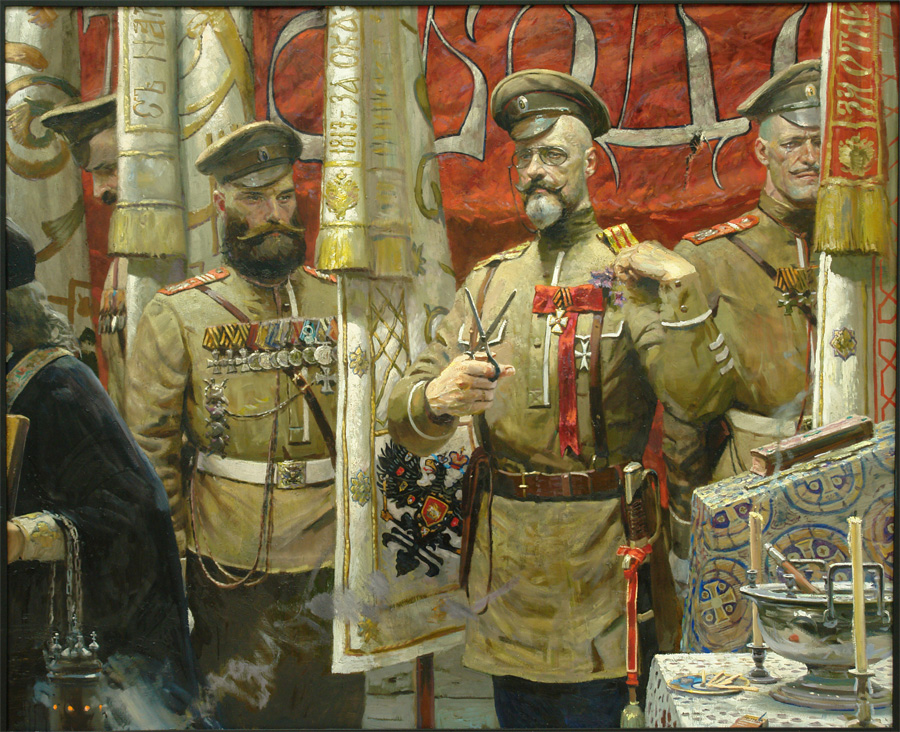
Alexander Kutepov removing his shoulder straps after hearing of the 304-year Romanov rule coming to an end

Alexander Pavlovich Kutepov (Russian: Алекса́ндр Па́влович Куте́пов; 28 September 1882 – 26 January 1930) was a Russian military officer in the Imperial Russian Army and later an anti-communist officer in the Volunteer Army during the Russian Civil War. From 1928 to 1930, he chaired the Russian All-Military Union (ROVS). He was assassinated after being abducted by OGPU agents in Paris in 1930.

== Early life and military career ==
Alexander Kutepov was born into the family of a personal nobleman, Konstantin Mikhailovich Timofeev, and his wife, Olga Andreevna, in Cherepovets, Novgorod Governorate. In 1890, Konstantin died. In 1892, Olga Andreevna married hereditary nobleman Pavel Aleksandrovich Kutepov, an official for peasant affairs of the Foresters' Corps; after the Stolypin reform, he became chairman of the Land Survey Commission. On 9 March 1893, by a ruling from the Novgorod District Court, children born by Olga Andreevna in her first marriage (including Alexander) were legally adopted by her second husband, Pavel.

Alexander Kutepov was educated at the Arkhangelsk gymnasium (graduated from 7th grade). In 1902 he entered the Junker Infantry School in St. Petersburg, from which he graduated in the 1st category. A year later, the younger clerk-junker Kutepov had been noticed at the parade by the Grand Duke Konstantin Konstantinovich, who appointed him right away to sergeant-major, bypassing the rank of senior caravan-junker.

=== Participation in the Russo-Japanese War ===
As a young infantry officer, he fought in the Russo-Japanese War, where he was severely wounded in action and decorated for valor. On 9 August 1904 he was promoted to lieutenant of the 85th Vyborg Infantry Regiment, one of the oldest formations within the Russian Army.

Upon arrival at the regiment, Kutepov asked for the appointment to the survey corps — the group that was entrusted with the most dangerous missions. Soon he led a night-time raid on a Japanese outpost in which Russian scouts captured rich trophies, including machine guns and rifles.

The Order of St. George was awarded to the head of the survey corps, who had not participated in the raid. When the details of the operation became known after the war, efforts were made to ensure that Kutepov also received the order. Kutepov was ultimately awarded the order of the German Crown with swords and on the ribbon of the Iron Cross through the intervention of German emperor Wilhelm, after whom the Regiment was named.

Alexander Pavlovich was returning from Manchuria to the capital separately from his regiment after being appointed to a special team sent to Russia to train new recruits. Here Kutepov first encountered a revolution: en route to Saint Petersburg, they stopped in a community where the local revolutionaries had declared a republic, the administration was confused, and he had to break through, taking full responsibility for the echelon and arresting the strike committee of the railway station. Upon arrival in Saint Petersburg, on a presentation to the emperor, Kutepov received from the Tsar's hands the Order of St. Vladimir of the 4th degree with swords and bow for his front-line services.

=== Officer of the Preobrazhensky Regiment ===
In 1906, he was transferred to the Preobrazhensky Regiment, an elite guards regiment. Beginning as a lieutenant in 1907, he became a captain in 1911, serving as an assistant to the head of the training team, head of the machine-gun team, head of the survey team, commander of the 15th Company, and head of the training team.

With the beginning of mobilization, the training team was disbanded, and Kutepov accepted the 4th company of the Preobrazhensky Life-Guard Regiment, with which he went to the front in the First World War. He was wounded in a battle near Vladislavov on 20 August 1914. In 1915 he was promoted to captain with seniority from 19 July 1915. He was awarded the Order of St. George, 4th degree: "For the fact that on July 27, 1915, in the battle near the village of Petrilov, when the Germans, after intensifying the preparation of heavy guns with artillery fire, captured the trenches of one of the companies, he, being in private support, not being able to receive instructions on the terms of the battle, on his own initiative, he went over to the counter-attack and, despite significant losses, knocked out the enemy from their position and restored his position, and although he was badly wounded, he continued to lead the battle until the evening."

As a result of this counterattack, the German offensive was delayed for several hours. After the 4th company, he commanded a company of His Majesty and the 2nd battalion. Granted by George's Arms

"Because being in the rank of captain in the battle on September 7, 1916 near the Svinukh forest, commanding the 2nd battalion and having advanced under hurricane fire from the right flank of the division over its left combat area, from the battle captured enemy trenches north of the Svinukh forest, restrained them by repulsing a series of fierce counter-attacks by the Germans, filling a dangerous breakthrough between the Life Guards Izmailovsky and Semenovsky regiments, thereby contributing to the successful outcome of the entire battle."

During the course of the war, he rose from company, to battalion to commander of the Preobrazhensky Regiment when he was promoted to colonel on 25 November 1916 with seniority from 26 September 1916. As such, he became the last commander of this historic regiment.

In December 1916, Colonel Kutepov was elected by the general meeting of officers of the regiment to the court of honor and to his administrative team. 1 April 1917, already in the context of the ongoing "democratization" of the army, was re-elected to the court of honor. He was awarded the Order of Saint Anna of the 4th degree with the inscription "For Courage" and the St. Stanislav of the 3rd degree with swords .

=== The February Revolution ===
During the February Revolution, Colonel Kutepov, who was on short leave in Petrograd, turned out to be the only senior officer who tried to organize effective resistance to the rebels by leading, on behalf of the commander of the Petrograd Military District, General S.S. Khabalov, a combined detachment aimed at suppressing the revolution. However, his detachment was not supported by other military units located in Petrograd, and part of the officers sent to his disposal showed no desire to fight for the monarchy. In this situation, Kutepov's detachment could not have a serious impact on the development of events and was forced to stop resistance.

After the victory of the revolution, he returned to the front as the commander of the Preobrazhensky Life-Guard Regiment, which was one of the few units of the army that retained combat effectiveness in conditions of active anti-war agitation. He was recommended for the award of the Order of St. George of the 3rd degree for distinctive service in the battles near the village of Mshany during the Tarnopol breakthrough, on 7 July 1917, but did not receive it because of the recommendation did not reach the government in the post-revolutionary chaos. According to his fellow officer V. Deutrich:

"Kutepov’s name has become an eyesore. It means fidelity to duty, calm determination, intense sacrificial impulse, cold, sometimes cruel will and ... clean hands — and all this is brought and given to the service of the Motherland".

== Russian Civil War ==
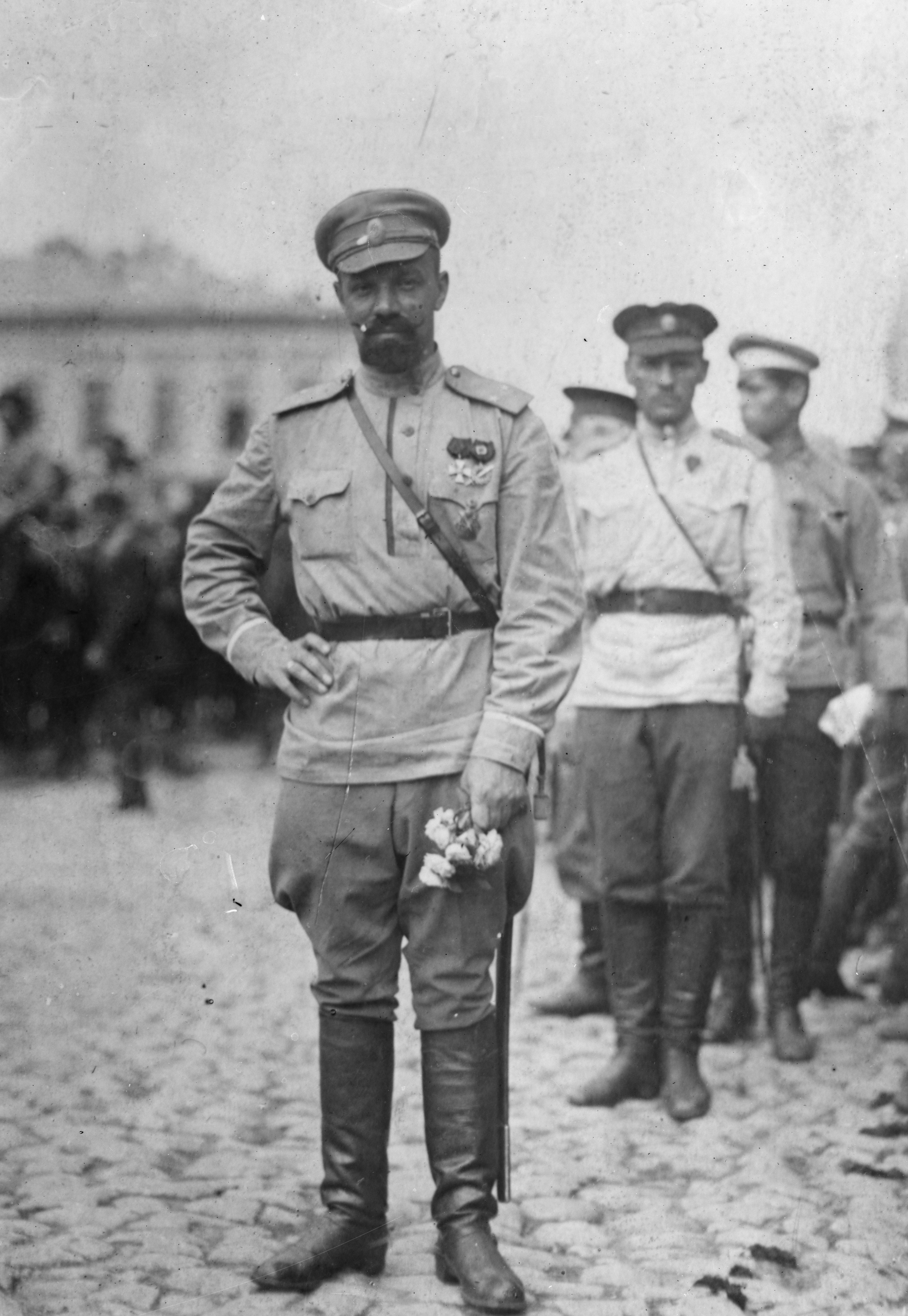
Alexander Kutepov in Kharkiv after taking the city in June 1919.

After the October Revolution, Kutepov joined the anti-Bolshevik Volunteer Army, part of the White Movement, at the very outset of the Russian Civil War. At the start of the Ice March in early 1918, Kutepov was a company commander of an officer's regiment. (In the beginning of the Russian Civil War the small Volunteer Army had a surplus of officers, which meant that many of them had to serve as common soldiers. These formations soon became the crack units of the White Army.)

After the death in battle of Colonel Nezhentsev, Kutepov took over the command of the Kornilov Shock Regiment, and after the death of the commander of the 1st Infantry Division, he became its commander. After the Volunteer Army captured Novorossiysk, Denikin assigned Colonel Kutepov as governor.

Starting in January 1919, 36-year-old Lieutenant General Kutepov became the commander of the 1st Army Corps of the White Army. Throughout his career, Kutepov had a reputation for being a decisive, direct and no-nonsense military leader. During the chaotic times of the Russian Civil War, order was usually rapidly restored after Kutepov's arrival. He accomplished this, however, by means of the swift and ruthless application of capital punishment on suspected looters and pogrom perpetrators. At the same time, however, Kutepov ordered mass executions of hundreds of Red Army soldiers and thousands of workers suspected of sympathizing with the Bolsheviks.

== In exile ==
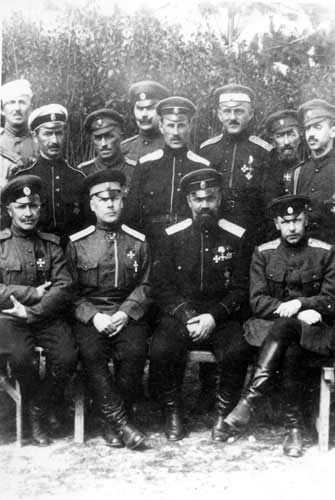
White Generals in Bulgaria, 1921. Seated from right to left : generals Shteifon, Kutepov and Vitkovsky. Standing (behind Kutepov) : generals Skoblin and Turkul.

After the White Army's final defeat in the Crimean Peninsula in November 1920, Kutepov and the remnants of his corps evacuated to Gallipoli. Despite very unfavourable and demoralizing circumstances, the troops in Gallipoli kept up their morale thanks to Kutepov's leadership. At the beginning of the Gallipoli period, Kutepov was disliked by many of the troops because of his disciplinary measures, but by the end, he was warmly regarded by most of them. When the Gallipoli camp was disbanded, Kutepov moved to Bulgaria in late 1921.

In May 1922, he was expelled from Bulgaria during the upheavals of the Aleksandar Stamboliyski era and resided in Serbia until 1924, when he and his wife settled in Paris. After General Pyotr Wrangel's death in April 1928, he became the commander of the Russian All-Military Union (ROVS). In this position, he abandoned the ROVS' strategy of waiting for Western powers' intervention in Russia; instead he stepped up sabotage and terrorist activities by ROVS inside the USSR. He is credited with setting up a counter-intelligence branch of ROVS, the Inner Line.

== Abduction and death ==
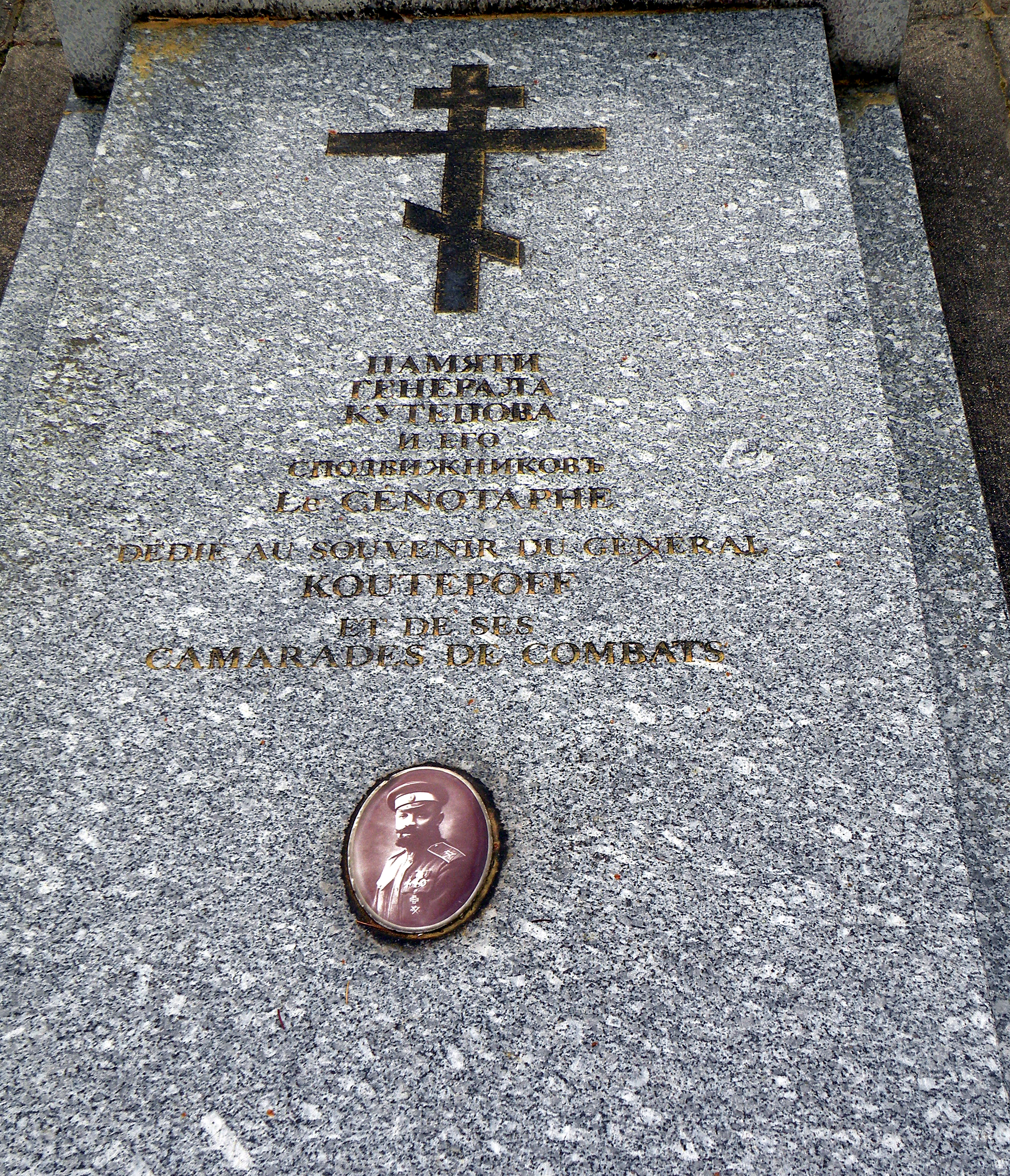
The Monument to the General Kutepov and to his associates

On 26 January 1930, Kutepov was kidnapped in Paris by OGPU agents. According to Pavel Sudoplatov,

This job in 1930 was done by Yakov Serebryansky, assisted by his wife and an agent in the French police. Dressed in French police uniforms, they stopped Kutepov on the street on the pretext of questioning him and put him in a car. Kutepov resisted the kidnapping, and during the struggle, he had a heart attack and died, Serebryansky told me. They buried Kutepov near the home of one of our agents near the outskirts of Paris.

The operation was also led by deputy head of the counterintelligence department of the OGPU Sergei Puzitsky.

Kutepov was believed by French police of having been smuggled to the Soviet Union. Former White Army general Nikolai Skoblin, a senior operative in the Inner Line, was suspected of being a key accomplice to the kidnapping. Walter Laqueur alleges, however, "Skoblin had nothing to do with this affair, because he was recruited only after Kutepov's disappearance." KGB General Sudoplatov confirms this allegation in his own memoirs.

According to the declassified UDBA documents compiled in early 1955, shortly prior to his abduction, Kutepov received 7 million francs from his French sponsors meant for ROVS activities.

His body was never found. There is a cenotaph memorial for Alexander Kutepov in the Sainte-Geneviève-des-Bois Russian Cemetery in Paris.

=== Distinctions ===
- Order of Saint Stanislav 3rd art. with swords and bow (1905)
- Order of Saint Anna, 4th art. with the inscription "For courage" (1905)
- Order of Saint Anna, 3rd art. with swords and bow
- Order of Saint Vladimir 4th art. with swords and bow (1905)
- Order of Saint Stanislav, 2nd art.
- Order of Saint Anna, 2nd art. with swords (VP 28.10.1914);
- swords for the Order of Saint Stanislav, 2nd art. (VP 09.04.1915);
- Order of Saint George 4th Art. (VP 09/26/1916)
- Golden Weapon for Bravery (PAF 03/14/1917)
- Cross of Saint George 4 tbsp. No. 1216556 with a laurel branch (for the battle on 07/07/1917 at the village of Mshany)
- Badge of the 1st Kuban (Ice) campaign
- Order of Saint Nicholas Thaumaturgus Ave. VSYUR (07/11/1920) No. 167
- Medal "In memory of the Russo-Japanese War"
- Medal "In memory of the 200th anniversary of the Battle of Poltava"
- Medal "In memory of the 100th anniversary of the Patriotic War of 1812"
- Medal "In memory of the 300th anniversary of the reign of the Romanov dynasty"
- Medal "In memory of the 200th anniversary of the naval battle of Gangut"
- Medal "For the works on the excellent performance of the general mobilization of 1914"

Foreign:

- Order Crown of the 4th Class with swords on the Iron Cross ribbon (for military distinctions in the Russo-Japanese War)
- Swedish Order of the Sword
- Romanian Order of the Crown of Romania
- Montenegrin Order of Prince Danilo I of the 1st 4th degree

== Personal life ==
Alexander Kutepov was married to the daughter of a college adviser Lydia Davydovna, née Kut (Kutt) (1888-1959). The son of General Kutepov, Pavel Aleksandrovich (1925-1983) in 1944 crossed the front line in Yugoslavia and joined the Red Army, served as a translator in SMERSH, but was soon arrested and taken to the USSR, where he was interned in the Vladimir Central Prison. He was released in 1954 and in 1960-1983 he worked as a translator in the Department for External Church Relations of the Moscow Patriarchate.

In the research literature there are references to the general's niece, Maria Vladislavovna Zakharchenko-Schulz, while the historian P. N. Bazanov wrote that this was a nickname, explaining his appearance by the fact that Zakharchenko-Schulz was a distant relative of Kutepov. The historian G.Z. Ioffe also wrote that it is incorrect to call Zakharchenko-Schulz a niece, since "niece" was her code name in correspondence with persons who collaborated with "Trust".

== Мemorial ==
In 1921, near the Russian cemetery of the Turkish city of Gelibolu, on the European shore of the Dardanelles, the memorial in the form of a stone mound was opened by Kutepov leadership together with the other ranks of the Russian Army and blessed by the Russian Orthodox Church. When the army left the Gallipoli camp, the cemetery and memorial were solemnly transferred to the care of the local administration. After the earthquake of 1949, the mound was severely destroyed and later demolished. In 1961, a copy of the Gallipoli monument was restored at the Russian cemetery of Sainte-Genevieve-des-Bois, near which the symbolic grave of General Kutepov is located. When the remains of General Kutepov are found, according to one version located near Paris, they will be buried in the grave reserved for the general. In 2008, the memorial was restored and again solemnly consecrated by the Russian Orthodox Church.

== Movies ==
- Gregory Gai — Operation Trust (1967)
- Vladimir Ferapontov — Going through the throes (1977)
- Stanislav Govorukhin — Marshal of the revolution (1978)
- Pyotr Shcherbakov — Shores in the Fog (1985)
- Konstantin Stepankov — Two knew the password (1985)
- Vitaliy Kishchenko — Wings of the Empire (2017)

== Bibliography ==
- Mikhail Kritsky (1882, Moscow - 1969, Paris), poruchik of the Russian Army, member of the White Movement, in exile in Paris — secretary in the Chancellery of the ROVS, one of the closest associates of Alexander Kutepov, author of the first biography of A. P. Kutepov.
- Andrei Petukhov, Russian historian of the 21st century.

== See also ==
- List of kidnappings
- Operation Trust
- Russian All-Military Union
