= Nikolai Skoblin =

Russian general and Soviet spy

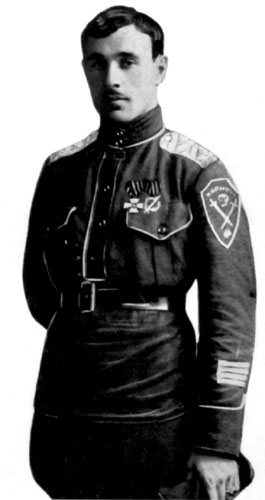
- Born: July 9, 1893; Nizhyn, Chernigov Governorate, Russian Empire
- Died: 1938; Spain
- Allegiance: Russian Empire; White movement Soviet Union
- Service years: 1911-1920; 1930-1931; 1937/1938
- Rank: Staff captain (1917); Major general (1920)
- Conflicts: First World War; Russian Civil War

Nikolai Vladimirovich Skoblin (Russian: Никола́й Влади́мирович Скобли́н; 9 June 1892 – 1938?) was a general in the White Russian Army, a senior operative in the émigré Russian All-Military Union (ROVS) and a Soviet-recruited spy, who acted as an intermediary between the NKVD and the Gestapo in the Tukhachevsky affair and was instrumental in the abduction of the ROVS chairman Yevgeny Miller in Paris in 1937. He was married to the Russian singer Nadezhda Plevitskaya.

== Early life and Russian Civil War ==
Nikolai Skoblin was a cavalry officer in Lavr Kornilov's Division of the White Army during the Russian Civil War, 1918–1920.

It is believed that he met his wife, Nadezhda Plevitskaya, during the war. Plevitskaya was a committed Bolshevik, considered to be a great beauty, who had been traveling the front singing and entertaining Red Army troops.

On 26 March 1920, aged 26, as the commander of the Kornilov Division within the Russian Army (under the command of General Pyotr Wrangel) he became a major general. After the defeat of Wrangel's army in November 1920, he evacuated to Gallipoli, and later moved to Bulgaria.

== In exile ==
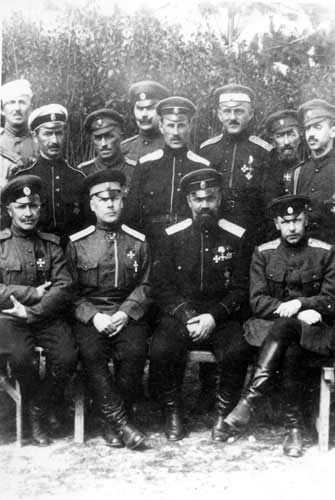
White generals in Bulgaria, 1921. Seated from right to left: Generals Shteifon, Kutepov and Vitkovsky. Standing (behind Kutepov): Generals Skoblin and Turkul.

When in Bulgaria, in 1923, he was relieved of the position of commander of the Kornilov regiment (formed in Gallipoli on the basis of the Kornilov Division's evacuees). Skoblin and his wife moved to Paris, where in 1929 he was reinstated as commander of the Kornilov regiment by General Alexander Kutepov, chairman of the Russian All-Military Union (ROVS).

Skoblin and his wife were recruited to the OGPU (the predecessor to the NKVD) by his former regimental comrade in Paris in September 1930 and received the code name Farmer. Skoblin was meanwhile gaining importance in the ROVS' ranks and in 1935 he headed its counter-intelligence branch, the Inner Line.

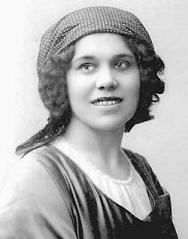
Nikolai Skoblin's wife, Nadezhda Plevitskaya

Skoblin played a key role in the joint operation by Germany and the NKVD against Soviet Marshal, Mikhail Tukhachevsky, who along with other senior Red Army commanders was tried and executed on orders from Joseph Stalin in 1937. Skoblin contacted Reinhard Heydrich who manufactured documents about Tukhachevsky being a German spy, which were transferred to Soviet leadership by Skoblin. This story was originally uncovered by Soviet intelligence defector Walter Krivitsky in his 1939 book In Stalin's Secret Service; Walter Schellenberg in his memoirs published in 1956 wrote about Germany's intentional denunciation of Tukhachevsky, with Edvard Beneš being used as a channel of this disinformation passed to Stalin.

On 22 September 1937, Skoblin, operating under the direction of deputy chief of Soviet foreign intelligence Sergey Spigelglas, lured the ROVS chairman Yevgeny Miller into an NKVD safe apartment for a meeting with two supposedly German officers. In reality, they were Soviet intelligence officers, Spigelglas and NKVD Paris rezident Kislov. Miller was drugged and smuggled aboard a Soviet ship in Le Havre to Moscow, where he was tortured and finally executed on 11 May 1939. (Copies of letters written by Miller, while he was imprisoned in Moscow, are in the Dmitri Volkogonov papers at the Library of Congress.)

However, the NKVD's plan to have Skoblin promoted to the presidency of the ROVS was thwarted, as Miller had been suspicious about Skoblin and the meeting, therefore he had left behind a note with details of the meeting to be opened if he failed to return.

== Death ==
There is no reliable information about the circumstances of Skoblin's death.

According to Pavel Sudoplatov, Skoblin, aided by Soviet intelligence officer Leiba Feldbin (Alexander Orlov), escaped to Spain and died in Republican-held Barcelona during a bombing raid.

Plevitskaya was put on trial and convicted by the French authorities as an accomplice to the kidnapping and presumed murder of Miller. She died in prison in 1940.

== In the media ==
Skoblin and Plevitskaya's story was fictionalized by Vladimir Nabokov, who had known Plevitskaya in Berlin, in his first English language story, "The Assistant Producer", in January 1943. It was also the basis of the French movie Triple Agent (2004) directed by Éric Rohmer. The Miller abduction and Skoblin's relationship with Max Eitingon was the subject of a rancorous squabble between Stephen Schwartz and Theodore Draper in the pages of the New York Review of Books in April 1988.
