= Vladimir Vitkovsky =

Russian White Army general

Vladimir Konstantinovich Vitkovsky
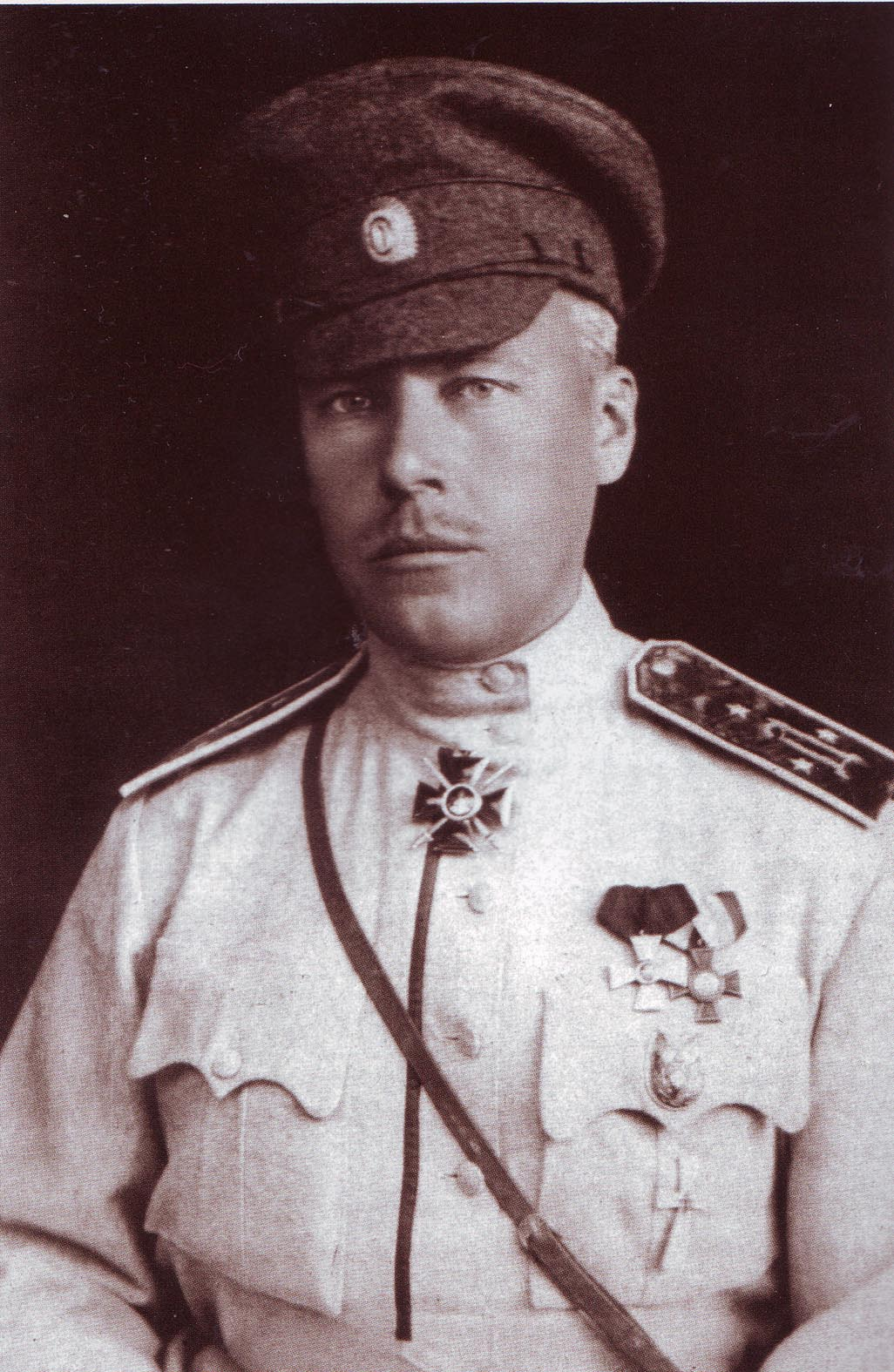
- Born: 21 April 1885; Pskov, Russian Empire
- Died: 18 January 1978 (aged 92) San Francisco, California
- Allegiance: Russian Empire (1905–1917); White movement (1917–1920)
- Branch: Imperial Russian Army; 1st Army Corps (VSUR)
- Service years: 1905–1920
- Rank: Lieutenant general
- Conflicts: World War I Russian Civil War

Vladimir Konstantinovich Vitkovsky (Russian: Владимир Константинович Витковский; April 21, 1885 – January 18, 1978) was a White Army general in the Russian Civil War.

He was born in Pskov. He served in the Imperial Russian Army in World War I. He was a recipient of the Order of St. George, the Order of St. Vladimir, the Order of St. Anna and the Order of St. Stanislaus.

In early 1918 Vitkovsky joined the special Russian volunteer brigade under the command of Colonel Mikhail Drozdovsky and took part in the Iași–Don March. In the Volunteer Army he participated in the Second Kuban Campaign and in June 1918 he commanded a battalion and then the 2nd Regiment, replacing Colonel Mikhail Jebrak, who had fallen in battle. In November he commanded a brigade of the 3rd Division and was promoted to major-general in December 1918.

In February 1919 Vitkovsky was appointed head of the 3rd Drozdovsky Division, with which he participated in the Advance on Moscow and the retreat towards Novorossiysk. In April 1920 he became lieutenant-general and received the Order of St. Nicholas Thaumaturgus for his actions in the Northern Taurida Operation.

After the defeat of the White movement, he evacuated to Turkey in November 1920 with fellow general Pyotr Nikolayevich Wrangel. After staying briefly in Bulgaria (1921–1922), he went to Paris, France, where he was a member of the Russian All-Military Union. After World War II, he emigrated to the United States. He died in San Francisco, California.

== Compositions ==
- Константинопольский поход: из воспоминаний о Галлиполи. Париж, 1933.
- В борьбе за Россию: воспоминания. Сан-Франциско, 1963.
