= Nadezhda Plevitskaya =

Russian singer (1884–1940)

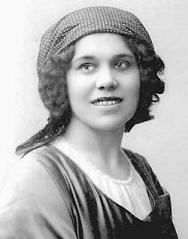
Nadezhda Plevitskaya

Nadezhda Vasilievna Plevitskaya (Russian: Наде́жда Васи́льевна Плеви́цкая; née Vinnikova (Ви́нникова); 29 January [O.S. 17 January] 1884 – 1 October 1940) was a popular female Russian folk singer. Following the Russian Civil War, she lived in exile and was later recruited by the NKVD.

== Early life and career ==
Nadezhda Plevitskaya — "Unhappy died at the military hospital". Words — K.R. (Grand Duke Konstantin Konstantinovich of Russia). Music — Jacob Prigogine (1909).

Nadezhda Plevitskaya — "Za morem sinichka" (folk dance song)

Plevitskaya was born Nadezhda Vasilievna Vinnikova to a peasant family in the village of Vinnikovo, near Kursk. She loved to sing, and after two years in a religious chorus, she became a professional singer in Kiev, where she married Edmund Plewicki, a Polish dancer. Soon, they moved to Moscow, where she began singing in the well-known Yar restaurant, whose specialty was gypsy bands with beautiful female singers. While on tour, at a concert in 1909, at the Nizhny Novgorod fair, she was heard by the great tenor Leonid Sobinov. He brought her to the attention of a wider public, which soon included the tsar's family as well as the opera singer Feodor Chaliapin.

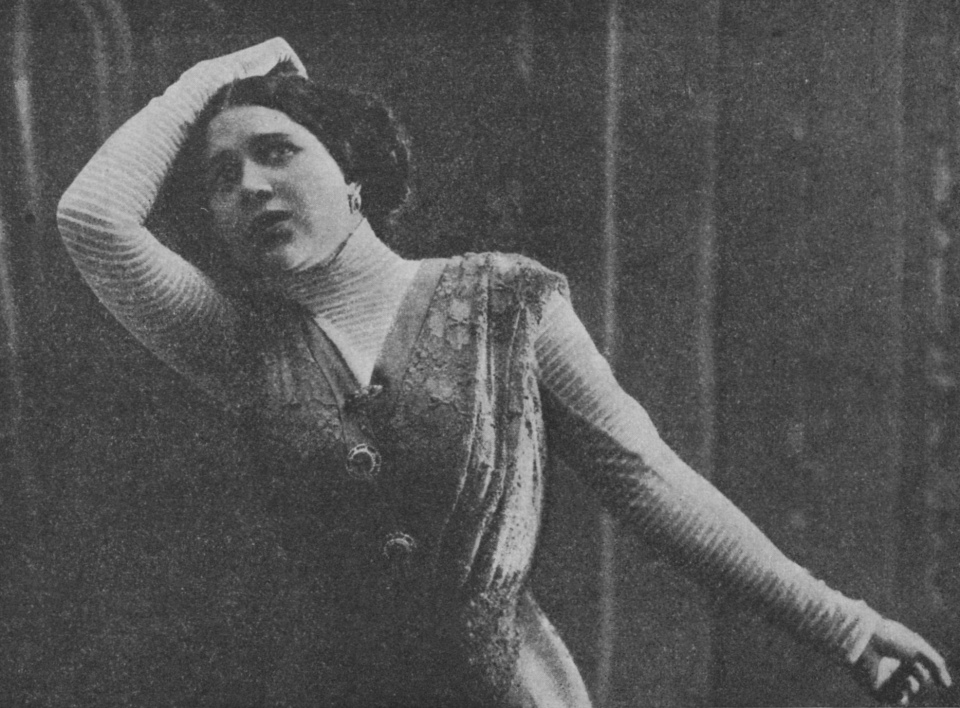
Nadezhda Plevitskaya

A Russian song site says:

Plevitskaya possessed a rare musicality, lush and flexible, and a mezzo-soprano of wide range. Her repertoire included, alongside popular ditties of mediocre quality, superb examples of Russian peasant folksong from Kursk province as well as songs of city life that are still meaningful today. Her manner of performance showed great sincerity, rich intonation, expressive declamation, and an unusually subtle and deep feeling for the beauty of Russian speech.

She later married a Lieutenant Shangin of the Cuirassiers, but he died in battle in January 1915. After the October Revolution, she became a communist and sang for the troops of the Red Army. In 1919, she was captured by a unit of the White Army, commanded by General Nikolai Skoblin, who married her in exile in Turkey after the defeat of the White Army.

== Exile in Europe ==
Plevitskaya made concert tours throughout Europe (and, in 1926, to the United States, where she was accompanied by the composer Sergei Rachmaninoff), while her husband, General Skoblin, took a leading role in a White émigré organization, the ROVS. It was there that Rachmaninoff heard her sing the song "You, My Cerise, My Rouge" (Белилицы, румяницы вы мои; Belilitsy, rumyanitsy vy moyi), which he used as the basis of the last of his Three Russian Songs for chorus and orchestra. However, neither career produced much income for Plevitskaya or Skoblin.

Plevitskaya, a woman known to love the fine furs and jewelry worn by affluent women in the West, persuaded Skoblin to work for the Soviet Union.

== Soviet intelligence agent ==
In 1930, Plevitskaya and Skoblin were recruited by the GPU (later the NKVD), the Soviet secret police. For some time, they worked together with the group of Sergei Efron. By all accounts, they served as accomplished and highly successful agents of Soviet intelligence. At first, the two were used on assignments in Western Europe.

However, their success soon resulted in periodic covert trips back to the Soviet Union, where she and Skoblin performed well-paid counterintelligence work in Moscow for the NKVD uncovering 'enemies of Stalin' while posing as 'Mr. and Mrs. Grozovsky'. Working under a variety of guises for the Soviet Central Executive Committee and the Foreign Trade Comissariat, she would appear for work at a Soviet government office as an extremely well-dressed typist-clerk, complete with lacquered nails, jewelry and well-tended skin, and would faithfully report on the actions and statements of its personnel.

== Miller abduction ==
Plevitskaya and Skoblin were closely involved in the 1937 abduction of a White general, Yevgeny Miller, who was kidnapped in Paris, drugged and smuggled to Moscow, where he was tortured for nineteen months before he was killed in May 1939. After the kidnapping, Skoblin escaped to Barcelona, where the pro-Soviet Spanish Republican government refused to extradite him back to France. Plevitskaya, always chauffeured around France by Soviet NKVD drivers in a Soviet embassy Cadillac, was constantly followed by the French police Citroëns.

She successfully lost her police surveillance in a high-speed auto chase outside Paris but was eventually arrested before she could escape across the border.

== Trial ==
Tried for the kidnapping of Miller, she claimed that the NKVD had abducted her husband as well, and that she was ignorant about Miller's disappearance and denied working as a Soviet agent. However, evidence of her espionage activities were found in her apartment. In 1938, she was sentenced to an unusually harsh term of 20 years in a French prison. The Soviets had been kidnapping other dissidents at the same time in France.

Alexander Mikhailovich Orlov, a Soviet defector, later claimed that Skoblin was induced to write to her undated love letters, which were later sent to her in prison to ensure her silence. The letters begged her not to reveal the extent of her activities as an NKVD agent.

== Death ==
She died in Rennes prison in the autumn of 1940.

== Legacy ==
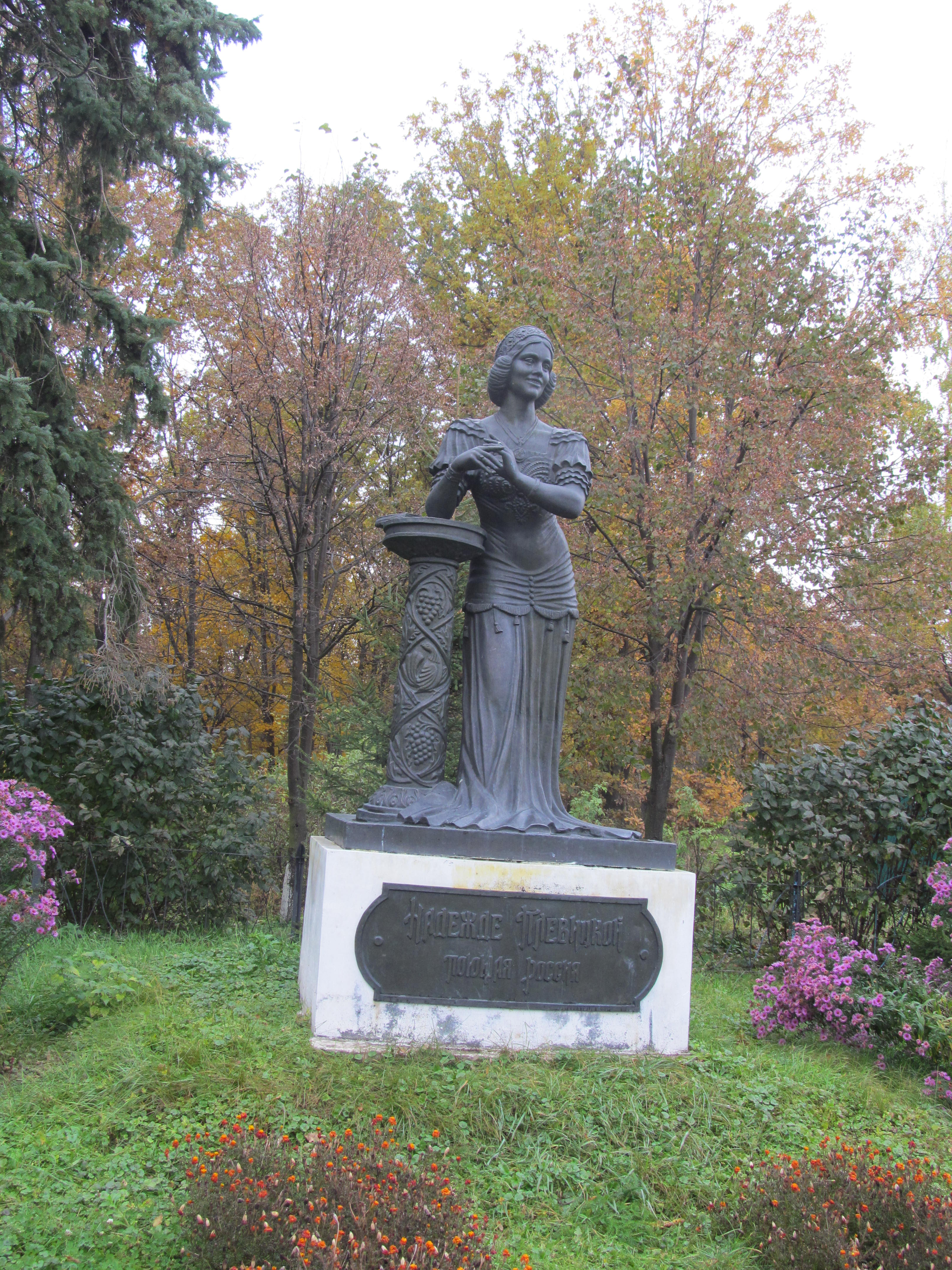
Monument to Nadezhda Plevitskaya in Kursk

Plevitskaya's story is told (under a different name) in Vladimir Nabokov's short story "The Assistant Producer" and the French film Triple Agent (2004). She and her husband are also mentioned in Anatoly Rybakov's semi-fictional novel Fear.

== See also ==
- Pyotr Leshchenko
- Alla Bayanova
- Lidia Ruslanova
