= Yevgeny Miller =

Russian general (1867–1939)

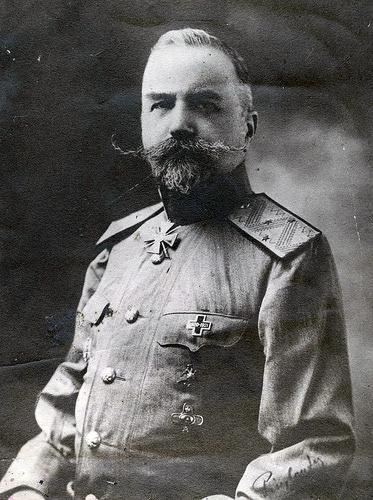
- Miller before 1920
- Born: 7 October [O.S. 25 September] 1867; Dünaburg, Vitebsk Governorate, Russian Empire
- Died: 11 May 1939 (aged 71); Moscow, Russian SFSR, Soviet Union
- Cause of death: Execution by shooting
- Military career
- Allegiance: Russian Empire (1884–1917); Russian Republic (1917); Russian State (1917–1920)
- Branch: Imperial Russian Army; White Army
- Service years: 1884–1920
- Rank: Lieutenant-General
- Conflicts: World War I Russian Civil War

Chairman of the Russian All-Military Union
- In office 26 January 1930 – 22 September 1937
- Preceded by: Alexander Kutepov
- Succeeded by: Feodor Feodorović Abramov

Governor-General of the Northern Region
- In office 23 January 1919 – 13 March 1920
- Supreme Ruler: Alexander Kolchak
- Preceded by: Vladimir Marushevsky
- Succeeded by: Position abolished

Commander of the Northern Army
- In office 19 August 1919 – 19 February 1920
- Supreme Ruler: Alexander Kolchak
- Preceded by: Vladimir Marushevsky
- Succeeded by: Position abolished

Vicepresident of the Provisional Government of the Northern Region
- In office 10 February – 19 February 1920
- Supreme Ruler: Alexander Kolchak
- Chairman of the Provisional Government: Nikolai Tchaikovsky
- Preceded by: Pyotr Zubov
- Succeeded by: Position abolished

Chief administrator of the Severnyy Krai
- In office 10 September 1919 – 19 February 1920
- Supreme Ruler: Alexander Kolchak
- Chairman of the Provisional Government: Nikolai Tchaikovsky
- Vicepresident of the Provisional Government: Pyotr Zubov; Himself

Minister of Foreign Affairs of the Provisional Government of the Northern Region
- In office 23 January – 2 August 1919
- Supreme Ruler: Alexander Kolchak
- Chairman of the Provisional Government: Nikolai Tchaikovsky
- Vicepresident of the Provisional Government: Pyotr Zubov

Minister of the Navy of the Provisional Government of the Northern Region
- In office 12 July – 2 August 1919
- Supreme Ruler: Alexander Kolchak
- Chairman of the Provisional Government: Nikolai Tchaikovsky
- Vicepresident of the Provisional Government: Pyotr Zubov

Yevgeny-Ludvig Karlovich Miller (Russian: Евгений-Людвиг Карлович Миллер; 7 October [O.S. 25 September] 1867 – 11 May 1939) was a Russian general of Baltic German descent and one of the leaders of the anti-Communist White Army during the Russian Civil War. After the civil war, he lived in exile in France. Kidnapped by Soviet intelligence operatives in Paris in 1937, he was smuggled to the Soviet Union and executed in Moscow in 1939.

== Early life ==
Miller was a career officer born to a Baltic German aristocratic family in Dünaburg (now Daugavpils, Latvia). After he graduated from the General Staff Academy, he served with the Russian Imperial Guard. Between 1898 and 1907, he was a Russian military attaché in several European capitals, such as Rome, The Hague, and Brussels. During the First World War, he headed the Moscow Military District and the 26th Army Corps and was promoted to the rank of lieutenant general.

== Civil War ==
After the February Revolution of 1917, Miller opposed "democratization" of the Russian army and was arrested by his own soldiers after he ordered them to remove red armbands.

After the October Revolution of 1917, Miller fled to Arkhangelsk and was declared Governor-General of Northern Russia. In May 1919, Admiral Kolchak appointed him to replace Vladimir Marushevsky in charge of the White Army in the region. In Arkhangelsk, Murmansk and Olonets, his anti-Bolshevik Northern Army was supported by the Triple Entente, mostly British forces. However, after an unsuccessful advance against the Red Army along the Northern Dvina in the summer of 1919, British forces withdrew from the region, and Miller's men faced the enemy alone.

== Exile ==
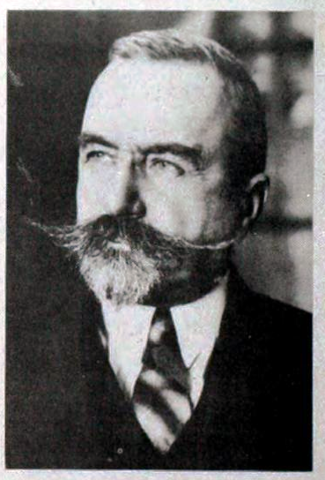
General Yevgeny Miller in the 1930s

In February 1920, General Miller with 800 refugees sailed from Arkhangelsk to Tromsø, Norway. Later, he moved to France and, together with Grand Duke Nicholas and Pyotr Nikolayevich Wrangel, continued his anticommunist activism.

Between 1930 and 1937, Miller served as chairman of the Russian All-Military Union (ROVS), an organization of exiled former White Army officers and soldiers opposed to the Soviet Union. His niece Nathalie Sergueiew also fled to France and subsequently became an MI5 agent. As the ROVS chairman, Miller was not an influential figure, as he did not belong to the dominant clan in the ROVS, namely former members of the White Army of South Russia, nor the former "Gallipoli campers". During the Spanish Civil War, Miller expressed support for the Nationalists. The ROVS attempted to create its own Russian unit to join the Nationalists, which would be composed of at least 2,000 soldiers. However, the effect proved insignificant: only several dozen Russians agreed to join the Nationalists.

== Illegal rendition ==
On 22 September 1937, a former Tsarist officer, All-Military Union counter-intelligence chief, and NKVD mole, Nikolai Skoblin led Miller to a Paris safe house, ostensibly to meet with two German Abwehr agents, who were in fact officers of the Soviet NKVD disguised as German military intelligence operatives. They drugged Miller, locked him inside a steamer trunk, and smuggled him aboard a Soviet ship in Le Havre.

Miller, however, had left behind a note to be opened in case he failed to return from the meeting. In it, he detailed his mounting suspicions about Skoblin. French police launched a massive manhunt, but Skoblin fled to the Soviet embassy in Paris and eventually was smuggled to Barcelona, where the Second Spanish Republic refused to extradite him to the Third French Republic. However, the French police arrested Skoblin's wife, Nadezhda Plevitskaya. A French court convicted her of kidnapping and sentenced her to 20 years in prison. Plevitskaya died in prison in 1940.

The NKVD successfully smuggled Miller back to Moscow, where he was tortured and summarily shot nineteen months later on 11 May 1939, at the age of 71. NKVD agent Pavel Sudoplatov later claimed that "[Miller's] kidnapping was a cause célèbre. Eliminating him disrupted his organization of Tsarist officers and effectively prevented them from collaborating with the Germans against us." Sudoplatov also claimed that Western accounts of NKVD agent Leonid Eitingon having played a role in the abduction of Miller were false.

Copies of letters written by Miller while imprisoned in Moscow are in the Dmitri Volkogonov papers at the Library of Congress.

== See also ==
- Mikhail Kvetsinsky, Miller's chief of staff
- North Russia Intervention
