= Operation Scherhorn =

WWII Allied intelligence operation

Operation Scherhorn (in English sources) or Operation Berezino (original Soviet codename) or Operation Beresino (in East German sources) was a secret deception operation performed by the NKVD against the Nazi secret services from August 1944 to May 1945. It was proposed by Joseph Stalin, drafted by Mikhail Maklyarsky and executed by Pavel Sudoplatov and his NKVD subordinates, assisted by German antifascists and communists. (Note: The official site of the SVR names Pavel Sudoplatov the head of the operation; Nahum Eitingon, Mikhail Maklyarsky and Georgy Mordvinov his deputies in charge of Operation Scherhorn and Willie Fischer as the chief of wireless communications.)

The main objective of Operation Berezino was to create the illusion of a large German armed group operating behind the front line in Soviet held territory, and to deplete Nazi intelligence resources through capture and extermination of field operatives sent to assist these fictitious troops. The NKVD set up a fake German "resistance pocket" under "command" of Lieutenant-Colonel Heinrich Scherhorn, a real German prisoner of war who was forced to cooperate with the Soviets. The German response, Otto Skorzeny's Operation Freischütz (Operation Poacher in post-war English sources), developed according to Soviet expectations. (Note: Operation Poacher was used, for example, in the original 1950 edition of Skorzeny's memoirs—Skorzeny, pp. 173 and 182.) The German commandos sent by Skorzeny were routinely arrested and forced to take part in the Soviet funkspiel. German support gradually faded but the German command maintained radio contact with "Group Scherhorn" until May 1945.

== Background ==
According to Pavel Sudoplatov, NKVD officers Victor Ilyin and Mikhail Maklyarsky conceived Operation Berezino as an extension of Operation Monastyr ("Operation Monastery") (1941–1944). In 1941, NKVD operative Alexander Demyanov (Алекса́ндр Петро́вич Демья́нов, Soviet codename Heyne), who disguised himself as a disgruntled bohemian socialite, established contact with the German resident in Moscow. The NKVD used this opportunity to expose the Abwehr undercover network in the Soviet Union. In December 1941, Demyanov "defected" to the Germans and showed up at the Abwehr field office in Smolensk, a city in western Russia near the border with present-day Belarus. Three months later, he returned to Moscow as a trusted German agent. His apartment became a death trap for scores of genuine German agents, but he retained the trust of his German superiors. In the middle of 1942, Demyanov's control officer, Willie Fischer, expanded the operation into a strategic level disinformation campaign. For more than two years, Demyanov supplied Reinhard Gehlen, the head of Fremde Heere Ost (Foreign Armies East) department with carefully-scripted "military plans."

According to Sudoplatov, the German success in repelling Operation Mars was, in part, influenced by "correct" information fed to Gehlen through Demyanov. The intent of feeding the Germans information about an operation, was to conduct strategic deception to distract the Germans from the simultaneous Operation Uranus, in the south. The Germans were indeed surprised by the latter attack, which resulted in the encirclement and eventual surrender of the German 6th Army at Stalingrad. This account is disputed by historian David Glantz, who argues that the Rzhev operation was not intended as a deception or diversionary attack but that it became a post hoc propaganda justification that shielded Georgy Zhukov from blame for the costly failure of Operation Mars.

According to Sudoplatov, Joseph Stalin personally monitored the progress of Operation Monastyr. The NKVD men who engaged in it were highly rewarded, but Stalin was dissatisfied with the limited scope of the operation. Shortly before the beginning of Operation Bagration, he summoned Victor Abakumov, Vsevolod Merkulov, Fyodor Fedotovich Kuznetsov, and Sudoplatov and ordered a new disinformation campaign. (Note: According to Sudoplatov, he was then unaware of Operation Bagration.) Stalin's instructions, recorded by Sergei Shtemenko, shifted the objective toward methodical physical destruction of German special forces and their intelligence capability. Sudoplatov had to set up a believable "German camp" behind the advancing Soviet troops and call the German command for help. Stalin reasoned that the Germans would expend their best commandos in futile rescue missions. The fake "camp" would also divert German airlift resources from supporting the real pockets of resistance.

== Planning ==
The new operation, codenamed Berezino, was drafted by Colonel Mikhail Maklyarsky and approved by Stalin, NKVD Chief Lavrenty Beria and Foreign Minister Vyacheslav Molotov. NKVD officers Nahum Eitingon, Willie Fischer, Mikhail Maklyarsky, Alexander Demyanov and Yakov Serebryansky departed to Belarus with a group of ethnic German antifascists. More pro-Soviet Germans, who earlier engaged in mopping up Polish and Lithuanian forest brothers, joined them at the base camp some 100 kilometres (62 mi) east of Minsk. The NKVD men screened groups of German prisoners-of-war captured during Operation Bagration and picked Lieutenant-Colonel Heinrich Scherhorn as the "front" for their operation. Scherhorn, a former commander of the guards' regiment of the 286th Security Division, was taken prisoner on July 9, 1944. According to the NKVD veteran Igor Schors, the choice was sealed by the connection between the Scherhorn family and Hitler. In the early 1930s, Scherhorn's father had made substantial donations to the Nazi Party. Scherhorn and his radio operator agreed to play the Soviet game. (Note: Kleinjung: "Scherhorn war sichtlich erfreut, Deutsche zu sehen und sich mit ihnen unterhalten zu können ... Er und einige andere, darunter auch der Funker, gerieten in Gefangenschaft. In zahlreichen Gesprächen wurden sie zur Zusammenarbeit bewegt und erklärten sich zu einem einzigartigen Funkspiel mit dem deutschen Generalstab bereit." ("Scherhorn was visibly pleased to see Germans, and talk to them ... He and some others, among them the radio operator, were taken prisoner. In numerous conversations, they were moved to cooperation, and agreed to perform a unique Funkspiel with the German general staff.")) German communist Gustav Rebele assumed the role of Scherhorn's aide, watching his "commander" day and night.

Berezino began on August 18, 1944 with a wireless message from Max, who was actually the NKVD agent Alexander Demyanov, to German Command. (Note: Date stated on the official SVR site. Kleinjung provides a different date, August 19.) Max reported that Scherhorn's detachment of 2,500 men was encircled by the Soviets in the swamps near the Berezina River. According to German sources, Colonel Hans-Heinrich Worgitzky of OKH Counter-intelligence suspected a Soviet Funkspiel and refused to commit his men to rescue "Scherhorn". Gehlen intervened and demanded full support to "Scherhorn" which he thought would ideally fit Otto Skorzeny's plan of guerilla action behind the front line. Oberkommando der Wehrmacht (OKW, High Command of the Armed Forces) Chief of Staff Alfred Jodl instructed Skorzeny to begin the rescue operation.

== First casualties ==
According to the German communist Karl Kleinjung, in early September, Eitingon announced the first success; the German command confirmed departure of a group of four or five commandos. The Soviets mustered a "welcome party" dressed in battered Nazi field uniforms. Some, like Kleinjung, were ethnic Germans, but others were NKVD men who did not speak the language. Between 01:00 and 02:00 on September 16, a Heinkel He 111 made two runs over the drop zone, releasing supply containers and paratroopers. According to the official site of the SVR there were three radio operators. According to Kleinjung, there were two SS commandos, with one of them a radio operator and two agents of Baltic descent. (Note: Kleinjung: "Agenten des deutschen Geheimdienstes, die aus Litauen, Lettland und Estland kamen" ("Agents of the German secret service from Lituania, Latvia and Estonia").) The last two were quietly subdued by NKVD, and the two SS men were cordially welcomed and escorted to Scherhorn's tent. After the meeting, the guests were arrested by the NKVD and forced to cooperate in the Funkspiel. They reported their safe landing over their wireless set, which persuaded the German command that the operation was proceeding as planned. They were followed by three more commando teams. According to Kleinjung, the NKVD intercepted all three without arousing suspicion.

Skorzeny wrote about four airborne SS teams. All were dressed in Soviet field uniforms, armed with Soviet handguns and stripped of any personal items that could give away their identities. The first one (Einsatz P) disappeared before the commandos or the aircraft crew could confirm landing. The second one (Einsatz S) made radio contact with Skorzeny after four days of silence. It reported that they safely reached its objective; Scherhorn spoke to the German command over the wireless. The third team (Einsatz M) disappeared without trace. The fourth one (Einsatz P) reported that it had landed far off the drop zone and had to reach it on foot by wandering through the forests infested with NKVD and Soviet deserters; however, contact was soon lost. Three weeks later, Einsatz P safely crossed the front line in Lithuania and reported horrors of Soviet atrocities on their way.

== Spy games ==
"Scherhorn" reported that a rapid breakthrough was made impossible by a large number of wounded, and the German command suggested airlifting the wounded to the German rear, which, according to Kleinjung, would have exposed the Soviet ploy. Skorzeny sent an engineer to manage construction of the runway. (Note: Soviet and East German sources do not mention the arrival of the engineer or his team. Shmorgun, pp. 208–212, names a number of German officers flown to "Scherhorn" to supervise evacuation by air.) The Soviets responded with staging a believable night fight between "Group Scherhorn" and "Soviet troops" at the very same moment that two transport planes arrived over the properly-illuminated airfield. One of the pilots attempted to land despite the commotion on the ground, but immediately before the touchdown, the NKVD men extinguished the runway lights, forcing both planes to abandon their mission. Skorzeny received reports that the runway was permanently disabled by a Soviet air raid.

According to Russian sources, the execution of the air raid was indeed planned by Colonel Ivan Fyodorov of the 4th Air Army. Before the night attack could materialise, the NKVD changed its mind and decided to use Fyodorov as a pawn in their game with Skorzeny. Fyodorov had to defect to "Scherhorn", fly to Germany with one of Skorzeny's planes and operate there as a double agent. Fyodorov, one of the few Soviet recipients of the Nazi Iron Cross, was well known to the Luftwaffe, and the Abwehr and could have indeed been a perfect double agent had it not been for his explosive outspoken personality. (Note: Fyodorov and Stepan Suprun received their Iron Crosses from Hermann Göring for their performance at an air show held in Berlin in June 1941, two weeks before the outbreak of Operation Barbarossa.)

Instead of openly approaching Fyodorov, the NKVD set up a mock ambush. NKVD men impersonating Belarusian nationalists and Russian monarchists kidnapped Fyodorov, took him to their camp in the forest and pressed him to change sides. (Note: The "monarchists" were "lent" from Operation Prestol, another NKVD operation unfolding in the same area; cf. Shmorgun, pp. 221–223.) The recruiters soon realised that Fyodorov was not fit for the job. Major Kopirovsky, the author of the failed proposal, suggested liquidating him, but Demyanov overruled him, and Fyodorov was allowed to "flee" from the camp and return to the Air Force.

== Agony ==
Skorzeny and Gehlen remained confident in the existence and combat worthiness of the 2,000-strong group. According to Kleinjung, they instructed Scherhorn to split it: half had to march 250 kilometres (160 mi) north to the Latvian–Lithuanian border, the rest to the south. According to Skorzeny, both detachments were to march north, with the smaller SS vanguard clearing the way for Scherhorn's main force. Scherhorn suggested that the march might bring them in contact with Polish population, and Skorzeny sent him his agents. They also fell into Sudoplatov's hands and exposed the German network in Poland. The Germans continuously supplied "Scherhorn" with food and equipment, which absorbed the scarce resources of Kampfgeschwader 200. According to the official site of the SVR, the Germans sent 39 flights and dropped 22 commandos with 13 wireless sets. That, according to Kleinjung, created a logistical problem for the NKVD since its once-compact team snowballed into a large formation. All of the German radio operators remained with the group to maintain radio contact with their German controllers, and the number of their NKVD guards and attending personnel grew accordingly.

By January 1945, air supplies dwindled because the front line had moved too far west, and the Luftwaffe could not afford the fuel to supply a remote army camp. Group Scherhorn increased its radio activity and flooded the German command with pleas for help. To motivate the German command, "Scherhorn" proposed a brisk march towards the Daugavpils area, where the ice was thick enough for transport aircraft to land. and Gehlen developed a fixation on the success of the "Scherhorn Raid". On February 20, 1945, he took over the operation from Skorzeny and declared it a matter of prestige, which had to be supported at all costs. In March, Skorzeny spoke against Gehlen's single-handed management, and Gehlen reluctantly backed off. Scherhorn remained a national hero; on March 23, 1945, he was awarded the rank of colonel and the Knight's Cross. According to the official site of the SVR, the German command communicated with "Scherhorn" until May 5, 1945. According to Kleinjung and Skorzeny, "Scherhorn" remained in contact with the command until May 8.

== Aftermath ==
After the end of the war, Sudoplatov used Scherhorn to recruit captive Admiral Erich Raeder and his wife. The attempt failed: according to Sudoplatov, Scherhorn and Raeder were "incompatible with each other". Scherhorn and his group were held prisoners in a camp near Moscow and repatriated in the early 1950s. Sudoplatov was arrested in the wake of the execution of Lavrenty Beria and served 15 years in prison; he was cleared of criminal charges in 1992.

Alexander Demyanov (Max) retired from the NKVD after one unsuccessful post-war mission in France. According to Sudoplatov, Gehlen offered Max for sale to the Americans, but the real Alexander Demyanov had become out of his reach. He worked as an engineer at the Mosfilm studios and died in Moscow in 1975. Mikhail Maklyarsky also worked for the movie industry as a screenwriter. Neither they nor any of the NKVD officers engaged in Operation Berezino was ever rewarded for it.

Reinhard Gehlen founded the Bundesnachrichtendienst, the West German secret service, and headed it until 1968.

Karl Kleinjung, one of the ethnic Germans attendants at Camp Scherhorn, quickly rose through the East German bureaucracy and became the head of the Stasi's First Chief Directorate (HA I), responsible for foreign intelligence. In 1997, he was indicted in the murders of civilians on the Inner German border but was acquitted in court.

Willie Fischer served as a KGB spy in the United States from 1948 until his arrest in 1957, under the alias Rudolf Abel, in what became known as the Hollow Nickel Case. In 1962, he was exchanged for U-2 pilot Francis Gary Powers.

== Sources ==
=== References ===
- Шерхорн, Генрих
- ru:Зобач, Григорий Григорьевич
- Операция «Березино»

=== Bibliography ===
- Biddiscombe, Perry (2006). The SS hunter battalions: the hidden history of the Nazi resistance movement 1944-45. Tempus. ISBN 0-7524-3938-3.
- Karl Kleinjung (2003).Nichts gewesen außer Spesen. Operation Beresina (in German). Verband Deutscher in der Résistance, in den Streitkräften der Antihitlerkoalition und der Bewegung "Freies Deutschland" e.V.
- Shmorgun, Vladimir (2005). Krasny Sokol (in Russian). Moscow: Golos Press. ISBN 5-7117-0081-2.
- Skorzeny, Otto (1950). Secret missions: war memoirs of the most dangerous man in Europe. Dutton. pp. 173–182.
- Stephan, Robert W. (2004). Stalin's secret war: Soviet counterintelligence against the Nazis, 1941-1945. University Press of Kansas. ISBN 0-7006-1279-3. pp. 175–181.
- Sudoplatov, Pavel (1995). Special tasks: the memoirs of an unwanted witness, a Soviet spymaster. Little, Brown. ISBN 0-316-82115-2.
- Von Zolling, Hermann; Hoenhe, Hans (March 22, 1971). "Pullach intern. Die Geschichte des Bundesnachrichtendienstes". Der Spiegel. (in German, pt. 2)
