= Inner Line =

The Inner Line (Russian: Внутренняя Линия) was a secret counter-intelligence branch of the Russian All-Military Union (ROVS), the leading Russian White émigré organization. General Alexander Kutepov is credited with setting it up in the mid-1920s. An alternative account sees the Inner Line as a group secretly established by Soviet intelligence within the ROVS.

Whatever its origin, the Inner Line became subject to severe penetration by OGPU/NKVD. It was seriously discredited after Soviet agents kidnapped the ROVS chairman General Yevgeny Miller in 1937, and following the subsequent disappearance of Nikolai Skoblin (Miller's aide and Inner Line senior operative), who, as a covert NKVD agent, lured Miller into the abduction operation.

== See also ==
- Operation Trust
