= Operation Trust =

1921–26 Soviet counterintelligence plan

Operation Trust (Russian: операция "Трест", romanized: operatsiya "Trest") was a counterintelligence operation of the State Political Directorate (GPU) of the Soviet Union. The operation, which was set up by Cheka, the GPU's predecessor, ran from 1921 to 1927, set up a fake anti-Bolshevik resistance organization, the Monarchist Union of Central Russia (MUCR) (Монархическое объединение Центральной России, МОЦР), in order to help the OGPU identify real monarchists and anti-Bolsheviks. The created front company was called the Moscow Municipal Credit Association.

The head of the MUCR was Alexander Yakushev, a former bureaucrat of the Ministry of Communications of Imperial Russia, who after the Russian Revolution joined the People's Commissariat of Foreign Trade, when the Soviets began to allow the former specialists (called "spetsy", Russian: спецы) to resume the positions of their expertise. This position allowed him to travel abroad and contact Russian emigrants. Yakushev was arrested for his contacts with the exiled White movement. In the same year of his arrest, he was recruited by the Soviet secret police by Artur Artuzov.

MUCR kept the monarchist general Alexander Kutepov from active actions, as he was convinced to wait for the development of internal anti-Bolshevik forces. Kutepov had previously believed in militant action as a solution to the Soviet occupation, and had formed the "combat organization", a militant splinter from the Russian All-Military Union (Russian: Русский Обще-Воинский Союз, Russkiy Obshche-Voinskiy Soyuz) led by General Baron Pyotr Nikolayevich Wrangel. Kutepov also created the Inner Line as a counter-intelligence organization to prevent Bolshevik penetrations. It caused the Cheka some problems but was not overly successful.

Among the successes of Trust was the luring of Boris Savinkov and Sidney Reilly into the Soviet Union, where they were captured.

The Soviets did not organize Trust from scratch. The White Army had left sleeper agents, and there were also Royalist Russians who did not leave after the Civil War. These people cooperated to the point of having a loose organizational structure. When the OGPU discovered them, they did not liquidate all of them, but manoeuvred them into creating a shell organization for their own use.

Still another episode of the operation was an "illegal" trip (in fact, monitored by OGPU) of a notable émigré, Vasily Shulgin, into the Soviet Union. After his return he published a book Three Capitals with his impressions. In the book he wrote, in part, that contrary to his expectations, Russia was reviving, and the Bolsheviks would probably be removed from power.

In 1993, a Western historian who was granted limited access to the Trust files, John Costello, reported that they comprised 37 volumes and were such a bewildering welter of double-agents, changed code names, and interlocking deception operations with "the complexity of a symphonic score" that Russian historians from the Intelligence Service had difficulty separating fact from fantasy. The book in which this was written, was co-authored by ex-KGB spokesman Oleg Tsarev.

Defector Vasili Mitrokhin reported that the Trust files were not housed at the SVR offices in Yasenevo, but were kept in the special archival collections (spetsfondi) of the FSB at the Lubyanka.

In 1967, a Soviet adventure TV series, Operation Trust (Операция "Трест"), was created.

In the 1920s and 1930s, the Soviet Union also pursued multiple "Trest-like" deception operations in East Asia, including "Organizator", "Shogun", "Dreamers" and "Maki Mirage," all against Imperial Japan. Like Trest, they involved the control of fake anti-Soviet operations to lure rivals.

== See also ==
- Active Measures
- False flag operations
- Honeypot (computing)
- Hundred Flowers Campaign, China
- Inner Line
- Political warfare
- Roman Malinovsky
- Sting operation
- Syndicate–2
- Tagantsev conspiracy

== Sources ==
- Christopher Andrew and Vasili Mitrokhin, The Mitrokhin Archive: The KGB in Europe and the West, Gardners Books (2000), ISBN 0-14-028487-7
- Costello, John and Oleg Tsarev, Deadly Illusions: The KGB Orlov Dossier Reveals Stalin's Master Spy, Crown Publishing, 1993. ISBN 0-517-58850-1
- Richard B. Spence Trust no One: The Secret World of Sidney Reilly, Feral House publ., 2003, ISBN 0-922915-79-2
- Gordon Brook-Shepherd Iron Maze. The Western Secret Services and the Bolsheviks, Macmillan, 1998
- Pamela K. Simpkins and K. Leigh Dyer, The Trust, The Security and Intelligence Foundation Reprint Series, July 1989.
