= Yakov Serebryansky =

Soviet security agent

- Born: Yakov Isaakovich Serebryansky; October 8, 1891; Minsk, Russian Empire (now Belarus)
- Died: March 30, 1956 (aged 64); Moscow, Russian Soviet Federative Socialist Republic, Soviet Union
- Other names: “Yasha”, “Uncle Yasha”
- Spouse: Polina Belenkaya
- Espionage activity
- Allegiance: Soviet Union
- Service branch: Cheka, OGPU, NKVD
- Service years: 1920–1946
- Operations: Spanish Civil War; The Great Terror

Yakov Isaakovich Serebryansky (Russian: Яков Исаакович Серебрянский) (born 11 December 1891 – died 30 March 1956) was an agent of the Soviet security services who created the first Soviet spy network in Palestine, and conducted special operations including the kidnapping and murder in Paris of a former Russian General Alexander Kutepov.

== Early career ==
Yakov Serebryansky was born in Minsk, in present-day Belarus, the son of a Jewish apprentice watchmaker. His date of birth is various given as 8 December (26 November old style 1891, 11 December (29 November old style) or 1892 He joined a student revolutionary group as a schoolboy in 1907, and in 1908 joined the Socialist Revolutionary (SR) Party. In 1909, he was arrested as a suspected accomplice in the assassination of the head of the Minsk prison. He was held in prison in 1909–1910, then exiled to Vitebsk. Drafted into the Russian Imperial Army in 1912, Serebryansky was seriously wounded at the start of the war with Germany, in August 1914, and was demobilised after long treatment in hospital. In 1915, he obtained a job as an electrician in Baku. After the February Revolution in 1917, he rejoined the SR Party. He moved to Moscow in spring 1920, and joined the Cheka, but was dismissed in 1921, and arrested as a member of the SR party. In October 1923, he applied to join the Communist Party and was enrolled by the foreign department of the OGPU (previously known as Cheka), and sent to Palestine, where he infiltrated the underground Zionist movement and recruited a group of operatives known as "Yasha's Group". In all, he is credited with recruiting more than 200 agents, in Palestine and western Europe. In 1925–28, he was an 'illegal' OGPU resident, based in Brussels and Paris. In 1929, he was appointed head of a section whose mission was to prepared sabotage and terrorism abroad, in the event of war. In 1929, he was appointed head of the 'special group' answering directly to the Chairman of the OGPU, Vyacheslav Menzhinsky.

== Foreign operations ==
On 26 January 1930, Serebryansky carried out the sensational kidnapping on a street in Paris of Alexander Kutepov, leader of a group of exiled Russian officers who were planning sabotage operations in the Soviet Union. According to Serebryansky's former colleague, Pavel Sudoplatov:

This job was done by Yakov Serebryansky, assisted by his wife and his agent in the French police. Dressed in French police uniforms, they stopped Kutepov on the street on the pretext of questioning him and put him in a car. Kutepov resisted the kidnapping, and during the struggle he had a heart attack and died, Serebryansky told me.

A different version is that Kutepov was stabbed to death during the struggle, by the police agent working with Serebryansky's.

Serebryansky also organised the theft of an archive held in Paris by Leon Sedov, son of Leon Trotsky. He also planned to kidnap Sedov, but was prevented by Sedov's sudden death.

During the Spanish Civil War, Serebryansky smuggled arms to the Republicans. This included getting 12 military aircraft across the French border, in defiance of an embargo of arms sales.

== Arrest and later career ==
In 1938, Serebryansky was recalled to Moscow and arrested. Lavrentiy Beria had recently taken charge of the security apparatus, now renamed the NKVD, and suspected Serebryansky of loyalty to a previous head of the NKVD, Genrikh Yagoda, who had been shot. On Beria's orders, Serebryansky was tortured by an officer named Viktor Abakumov, who beat a false confession out of him, but he withdrew his confession almost immediately. In 1941, he was sentenced to death, but the sentence was not carried out, and he was released after the German invasion of the USSR in July 1941, and chosen by Pavel Sudoplatov to run a section recruiting agents among German prisoners of war.

In 1946, when Abakumov was appointed head of the security services, now called the MGB, Serebryansky retired on a pension, unable to work for the man who had tortured him. When Beria was arrested in 1953, Serebryansky and his wife were suspected of being his accomplices. He was arrested on 8 October 1953, died in prison under interrogation. He was fully rehabilitated in 1971.
