= 1st Army Corps (Armed Forces of South Russia) =

- Active: 1918–1920
- Country: Russia
- Allegiance: (Russian Empire) White movement
- Branch: Armed Forces of South Russia
- Size: Corps
- Engagements: Russian Civil War; Southern Front

The 1st Army Corps (Russian: 1-й армейский корпус) was one of the main formations of the Armed Forces of South Russia (Russian: Вооружённых Сил Юга России, ВСЮР; VSUR) during the Russian Civil War. Formed in November 1918, it was first established as part of a reorganization of the White movement's Volunteer Army.

== First Formation ==
The 1st Army Corps was first formed on November 15, 1918. From May 15, 1919 it included the 1st and 3rd Infantry Divisions. By mid-June it included the 1st, 3rd, and 7th Infantry Divisions. And by September 15, 1919 the Corps included the 1st, 3rd, and 9th Infantry Divisions.

By October 14, 1919 it was Reorganized into the Volunteer Corps consisting of the Kornilov, Markov, Alekseev, and Drozdovsky Divisions.

== Second Formation ==
The 1st Corps was reformed for the second time on April 16, 1920 from the Non-Cossack units evacuated from Novorossiysk. It included the Kornilov, Markov, and Drozdovsky Divisions and the Separate Cavalry Brigade (From April 28, 1920 the 2nd Cavalry Division). On July 7, 1920 the 2nd Cavalry Division was transferred to the Cavalry Corps. By September 4, 1920 the 1st and 2nd Army Corps were assigned to the 1st Army still including the Kornilov, Markov, and Drozdovsky Divisions. During the Northern Tavria Offensive it lost 23% of its strength in three days of heavy fighting. Withdrawing to the Perekop isthmus until the final operation of the Civil War.

=== Operational history ===
This Corps was the main strike force of First the Volunteer Army then the Armed Forces of Southern Russia, and Finally the Russian Army under the Command of General Wrangel in the Crimea. It also contained the most elite infantry regiments at the disposal of General Denikin and later General Wrangel.

== Known commanders ==
- Lieutenant General Boris Kasanovich (15 November 1918 − 13 January 1919)
- Lieutenant General Alexander Kutepov (13 January 1919 − August 1920)
- Lieutenant General Pyotr Pisaryev (August 1920 − December 1920)
- Lieutenant General Vladimir Vitkovsky (from 8 December 1920)

== Sources ==
- Levitov M. N. Kornilovites in action, summer-autumn 1919
- Larionov V. A. To Moscow
- Trushnovich A. R. Memoirs of a Kornilovite (1914−1934)
- Turkul A. V. Pictures of the Civil War, 1918−1920
- Historian S. V. Volkov's site. Russian officers and the White movement
