= Order of Saint Nicholas Thaumaturgus (Wrangel) =

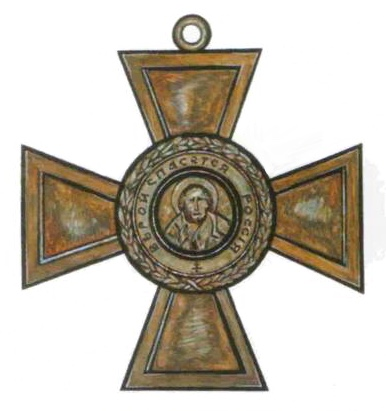
- Cross of the order

Awarded by the White Army
- Type: Order
- Established: April 30, 1920
- Ribbon: White, dark blue, red
- Motto: "Russia Will Be Saved Through Faith" (Вѣрой Спасётся Россія)
- Criteria: Military merit
- Founder: Pyotr Wrangel
- Ribbon bar

The Order of Saint Nicholas Thaumaturgus was instituted during the Russian Civil War on April 30, 1920, by the Commander-in-Chief of the Russian White Army, General Wrangel, to replace the highest military award of the Russian Empire, the Order of St. George. St. Nicholas was considered the patron saint of the White Army.

== Description ==
The order is an iron cross, in the center of the cross is a circle with an image of Saint Nicholas Thaumaturgus on dark-blue enamel. Around this image is a laurel wreath, the symbol of glory. Around the wreath is the motto of the order: "Russia Will Be Saved Through Faith" (Вѣрой Спасётся Россія, "Věroy spasyotsya Rossiya"). On the reverse side of the cross is a circle half of dark-blue enamel and half of white, with the date "1920." The order is worn on a ribbon of the Russian national colors (white-dark blue-red)."
