= Anton Turkul =

Russian Imperial Army officer

Anton Vasilyevich Turkul
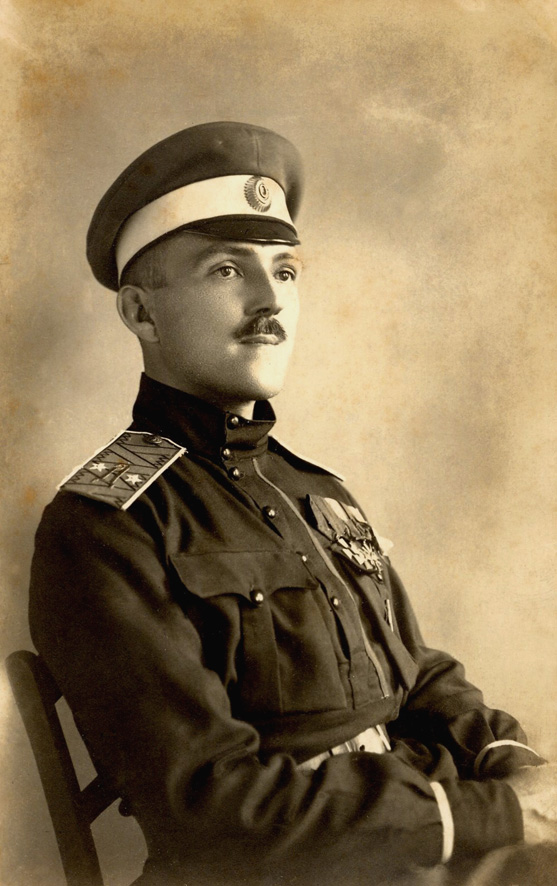
- Native name: Антон Васильевич Туркул
- Born: December 23, 1892; Tiraspol, Kherson Governorate, Russian Empire
- Died: August 20, 1957 (aged 64) Munich, West Germany
- Allegiance: Russian Empire
- Branch: Imperial Russian Army; Volunteer Army; Russian Liberation Army
- Service years: 1914–1920; 1944–1945
- Rank: General (White Army)
- Commands: Drozdovsky Division
- Known for: Officer of the White Movement and Nazi collaborator
- Conflicts: World War I Russian Civil War; World War II
- Awards: Order of St. George (4th class); St. George Weapon

Anton Vasilyevich Turkul (Russian: Антон Васильевич Туркул; Romanian: Anton Turcul) 11: (23) December 1892 – 19–20 August 1957) was a Russian Imperial Army officer, a commander in the White movement during the Russian Civil War, a Russian émigré political activist, and a senior officer of the Russian Liberation Army during World War II.

He served in the Imperial Russian Army, fought on the front and received several medals. He also participated in the march of the Drozdovsky Division.

He later became the commander of the remnants of the Drozdovsky Division under General Pyotr Wrangel.

== Biography ==
Anton Turkul was born into a family of Moldovan origin in Tiraspol, in the Kherson Governorate of the Russian Empire (now in Moldova); his family was of civil servants. He received a classical secondary education and graduated from the Richelieu Gymnasium in Odessa in 1909. Shortly afterward, he entered military service as a volunteer, choosing a professional officer career.

=== World War I ===
During World War I, Turkul served on the Eastern Front with the Imperial Russian Army. He was wounded several times and received multiple decorations for bravery, including the Order of St. George (4th class) and the St. George Weapon. By the end of the war, he held the rank of staff captain.

At the outbreak of World War I, Turkul was serving in the Imperial Russian Army. He saw combat on the Eastern Front and distinguished himself in several engagements. During the war, he was wounded three times and repeatedly cited for bravery.

For his service, Turkul received a number of Imperial decorations, including:

- Order of St. George, 4th class
- St. George Weapon
- Two St. George Crosses

By the end of World War I, he had reached the rank of staff captain (shtabs-kapitan). The collapse of the Russian Empire and the subsequent revolutionary events marked a turning point in his career.

=== Russian Civil War ===
Following the October Revolution, Turkul joined the White movement and became part of the Volunteer Army. He served under Colonel Mikhail Drozdovsky and took part in the Drozdovsky March from Iași to the Don region in early 1918, one of the most notable campaigns of the early Civil War.

Turkul quickly gained a reputation as a capable and determined commander. He led officer companies and battalions and later became commander of the 1st Drozdovsky Officer Regiment. After Drozdovsky's death, Turkul remained one of the most prominent officers associated with the unit.

In 1920, during the final phase of the Civil War in southern Russia, Turkul was appointed commander of the Drozdovsky Division within the Armed Forces of South Russia, subordinated to General Pyotr Wrangel. He held this command during the retreat to Crimea and the eventual evacuation of White forces.

After the defeat of the White Army, Turkul was evacuated from Crimea with the remnants of Wrangel's forces and left Russia permanently.

=== Exile and political activity ===
During the interwar period, Turkul lived in France, Germany, Italy, and Bulgaria, becoming an influential figure among White Russian émigrés. He was a vocal and uncompromising anti-Bolshevik and rejected reconciliation with the Soviet government.

=== World War II ===
In 1944, Turkul joined Andrey Vlasov's Russian Liberation Army (ROA), a collaborationist force formed under German auspices to fight against the Soviet Union. Turkul held senior command appointments and was involved in organizing ROA units in Austria during the final months of the war.

In May 1945, Turkul was arrested by Allied forces. He remained in custody until 1947. Unlike many other ROA officers, he was not extradited to the Soviet Union and was eventually released.

=== Later life ===
After his release, Turkul settled near Munich, in West Germany. He remained active in émigré political circles and continued to advocate anti-Soviet positions.

In 1950, he organized a congress of former ROA members and became chairman of the Committee of United Vlasovites, which sought to represent former ROA personnel in exile.

== Death and legacy ==
Anton Turkul died during the night of 19–20 August 1957 in Munich following surgery. He was buried at the Sainte-Geneviève-des-Bois Russian Cemetery near Paris, a major burial place for White Russian émigrés.

Turkul is remembered as a dedicated White Army officer and a prominent figure in the Russian émigré military tradition. At the same time, his participation in the Russian Liberation Army has made his legacy controversial.
