= Mikhail Drozdovsky =

Russian general (1881–1919)

Mikhail Gordeevich Drozdovsky
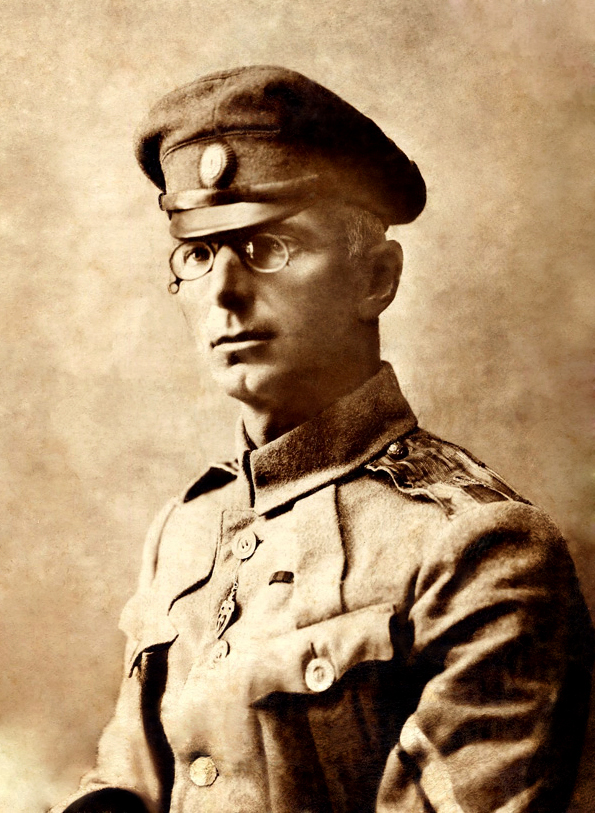
- Drozdovsky in c. 1919
- Born: October 7, 1881; Kiev, Russian Empire
- Died: January 1, 1919 (aged 37); Rostov-on-Don, South Russia
- Military career
- Allegiance: Russian Empire; Provisional Government; Russian Republic; General Command of South Russia
- Branch: Russian Imperial Army; Russian Army (1917); White Army
- Service years: 1899–1919
- Rank: Major general
- Conflicts: Russo-Japanese War; World War I Russian Civil War (DOW)

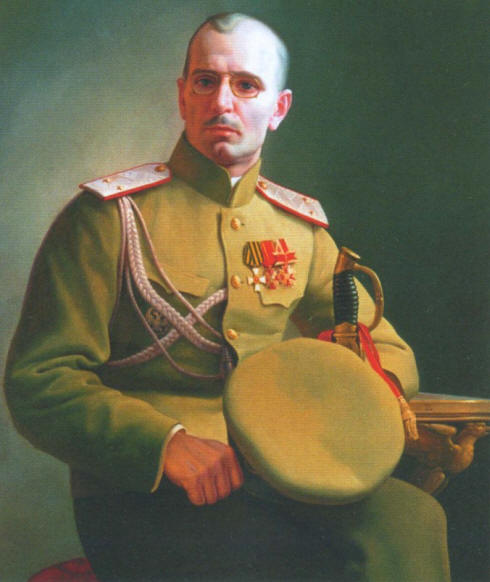
General Mikhail Drozdovsky

Mikhail Gordeevich Drozdovsky (Russian: Михаил Гордеевич Дроздовский; Ukrainian: Михайло Гордійович Дроздовський, romanized: Mykhailo Hordiiovych Drozdovskyi; 7 October 1881 – 1 January 1919) was a Russian army general and one of the military leaders of the anti-Bolshevik White movement during the Russian Civil War. In early 1918 he led a regiment of volunteers from the Romanian Front on a march to southern Russia, where they joined the Volunteer Army of the White movement.

== Biography ==
Drozdovsky was born in Kiev. His father had served in the Crimean War of 1853-1856 and became a highly-decorated general. Mikhail Gordeyevich's mother died when he was twelve, and he was largely raised by his elder sister, Yulia, who became a decorated nurse during the Russo-Japanese War of 1904-1905.

He started his military career early in life, entering the Polotsk Cadet Corps in 1892, and subsequently transferring to the Kiev Vladimir Cadet Corps, from which he graduated in 1899. In August 1899, he enrolled in the Pavlovsk Military School in St. Petersburg, famous for its strict discipline and considered a model in the training of officers of the Imperial Russian Army. He graduated in 1901 at the top of his class.

From 1901 Drozdovsky served in the Life Guards Regiment in Warsaw and was promoted to lieutenant in 1904. With the start of the Russo-Japanese War in 1904 he was sent to the front lines with the 1st Siberian Corps of the 2nd Russian Manchurian Army. He was wounded in the thigh during the Battle of Sandepu (January 1905), but remained on the front lines through the end of the conflict and was awarded with several decorations for heroism.

After the end of the Russo-Japanese War in September [O.S. August] 1905, Drozdovsky completed his studies at the General Staff Academy in 1908 and was promoted to Shtabs-kapitan, and to captain in 1910. He was stationed at the Headquarters of the Amur Military District in Harbin, Manchuria. In November 1911, he was appointed Assistant to the Senior Staff of the Warsaw Military District.

With the start of the First Balkan War in October 1912 he volunteered for service with the Serbian or Bulgarian armies, but failed to gain permission to do so. Instead, he was assigned (1913) to the Sevastopol Aviation School, where he became a pilot and trained on aerial reconnaissance. He also trained with the Imperial Russian Navy, taking a dive in a submarine, and also diving using a diving suit. After this training, he returned to the Warsaw Military District.

At the start of World War I in 1914, Drozdovsky served as a staff officer for the Russian 27th Army Corps in the 2nd Army within the Northwestern Front. He made a number of reconnaissance missions using an airplane and a balloon. From December 1914 he was assigned to the headquarters of the 26th Army Corps. He was promoted to lieutenant colonel in March 1915, and became Chief of Staff of the 64th Infantry Division in May 1915.

He led his division from the front in numerous battles to the end of 1915. From October 1915 he was chief of staff of the 26th Army Corps. From the summer of 1916 he was on the General Staff as a colonel, serving within the Southwestern Front. Wounded in the hand during a battle on August 31, 1916, he was awarded the Order of St. George (4th class).

With the February Revolution of 1917, the Russian military faced the collapse of central authority. Known as a staunch monarchist, Drozdovsky refused to acknowledge the formation of committees of enlisted men which challenged the authority of (and often murdered) their superior officers. He suppressed Bolshevik elements within his command through executions, and managing to maintain discipline and order, continued combat operations against the Germans until late August 1917.

After the Bolshevik seizure of power in the October Revolution of 1917, and the signing of Treaty of Brest-Litovsk in March 1918, Drozdovsky took the initiative to support Mikhail Alekseev's Volunteer Army on the Don with volunteer units from the Romanian front. By March, this included 800 from Kishinev, and 900 from Iaşi. According to Peter Kenez, during the Iași–Don March, "The small army moved quickly through the Ukraine; at times the soldiers covered 40 to 45 miles a day." On 4 May, Drozdovsky arrived at Rostov-on-Don, then helped capture Novocherkassk on 6 May.

Drozdovsky's private notes written during the march show him as a patriotic officer who felt that he had no choice but to fight the Bolsheviks—whom he considered the destroyers of Russia. The notes often reveal a sense of doomed resignation. This, however, did not prevent him from acting with great energy and from being an inspiration to his men.

On 21 April 1918, Drozdovsky briefly captured Rostov-on-Don. While battling for Rostov's train station, Colonel Voinalovich, Drozdovsky's second-in-command and closest advisor, was killed in action. Three days later, Drozdovsky's force came to the assistance of the Don Cossacks desperately battling Red forces at Novocherkassk. The Reds were defeated and Drozdovsky's men marched into Novocherkassk. It is here, after a 900-mile march from Romania to the Don, that Drozdovsky and his men officially became part of the Volunteer Army.

In June 1918, at the start of the Second Kuban Campaign, General Anton Denikin promoted Drozdovsky to the rank of Major General, and his unit, now augmented with an influx of new volunteers, was designated as the 3rd Infantry Division. Drozdovsky's unit became one of the elite formations of the Volunteer Army (later called the Armed Forces of South Russia). Drozdovsky was one of the first among the White Army commanders to augment his forces with Red Army prisoners they captured in battle. Although the initial performance of these former Red Army troops exceeded Drozdovsky's expectations, as their numbers increased their reliability decreased.

General Drozdovsky was wounded in October 1918, during a battle near Stavropol. Although initially it was thought that the wound was not serious, he never recovered and died on January 1, 1919, in the vicinity of Rostov-on-Don. Subsequently the 3rd Infantry Division, which consisted of several regiments, became known as the Drozdovsky Rifle Division, one of the famous "colored" units of the Volunteer Army. The Drozdovsky Division was well known for its esprit de corps. In 1920, before the departure of the Volunteer Army from Crimea, General Drozdovsky's remains were secretly reburied by his men in Sevastopol, Crimea, to prevent their defilement by the Bolsheviks (as happened with the remains of General Lavr Kornilov). Their exact location remains unknown to this day.

== Honors ==
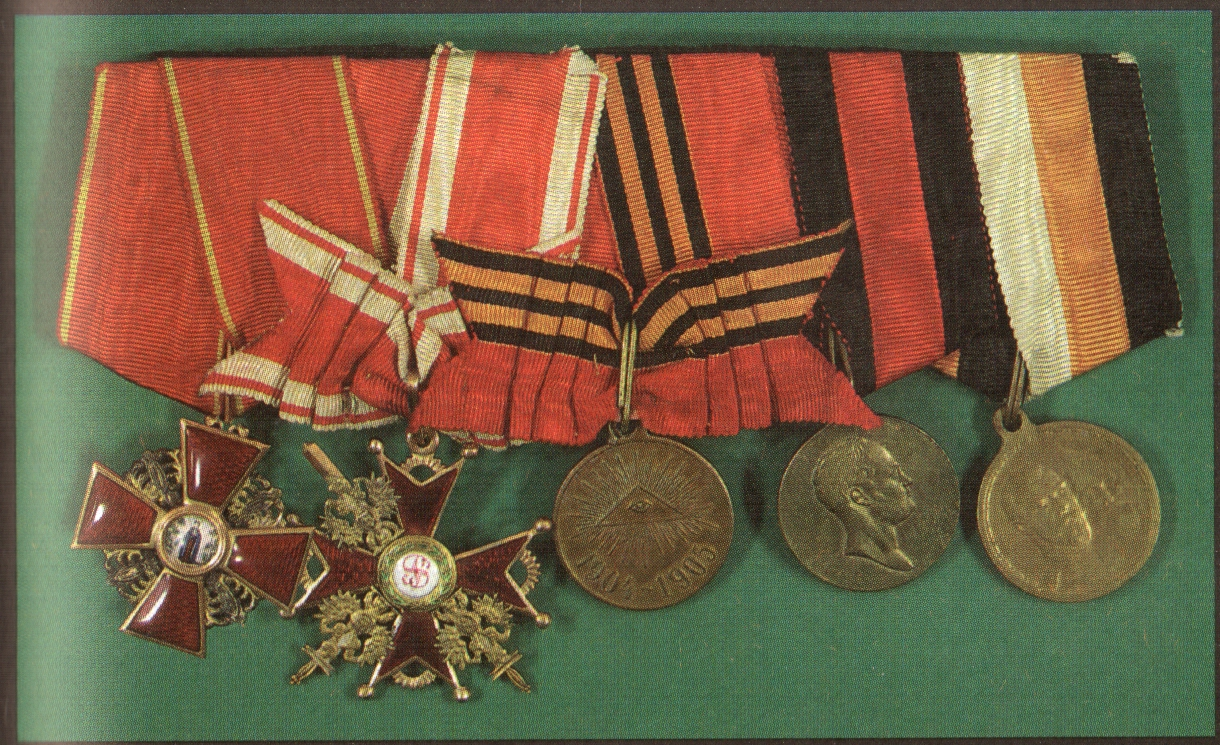
Drozdovsky's medals in 1914.

Drozdovsky was a recipient of the following decorations:

- Order of St. Anna 4th class, 1905
- Order of St. Stanislaus 3rd class, 1905
- Order of St. Anna 3rd class, 1911
- Order of St Vladimir, 4th class, 1915
- Order of St Vladimir, 3rd class, 1917
- Order of St. George 4th class, 1917
- St. George Sword, 1916
- Medal "300th anniversary of the Romanov dynasty," 1913
- Medal "100th anniversary of the Patriotic War of 1812," 1912

== See also ==
- White movement
- Volunteer Army
- Russian Civil War
