= Russian All-Military Union =

Russian White movement organization

- Русский Обще-Воинский Союз
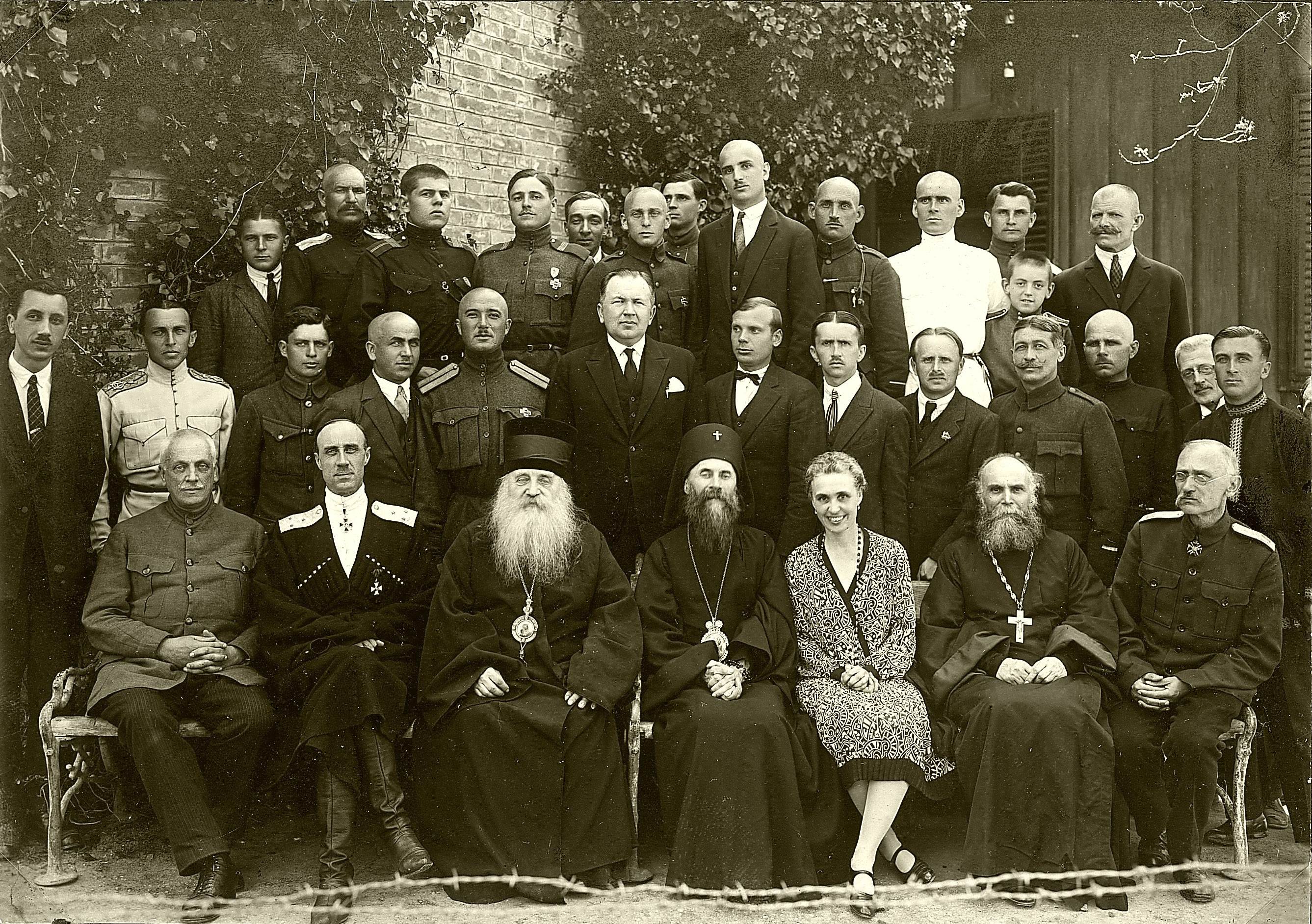
- Lieutenant General Pyotr Wrangel with Metropolitan Antony (Khrapovitsky), Archbishop (later Metropolitan) Anastasius (Gribanovsky), and his wife, surrounded by officials of the ROVS. Belgrade, 1927
- Formation: 21 September 1924
- Founder: Pyotr Wrangel
- Commander: Igor Borisovich Ivanov

The Russian All-Military Union (Russian: Русский Обще-Воинский Союз, abbreviated РОВС, ROVS) is a White movement organization that was founded by White Army General Pyotr Wrangel in the Kingdom of Serbs, Croats and Slovenes on 1 September 1924. It was initially headquartered in the town of Sremski Karlovci. The organization's ostensible purpose was providing aid to the veterans of the Russian White movement (usually of the Imperial Russian Army as well), soldiers and officers alike, who had moved outside the Soviet Union.

The organization's undeclared aim was to maintain a Russian military organisation with a view to fighting the Bolsheviks. It and the more monarchist Russian Imperial Union-Order are the oldest organizations that represent the Russian White government-in-exile. Ivan Alexandrovich Ilyin a political philosopher, and white émigré journalist, was an ideologue of the Russian All-Military Union.

== History ==
=== Establishment ===
The organization was established in Yugoslavia in September 1924 by General Wrangel. On 16 November, the supreme command of the ROVS, along with all White Army formations in exile, was assumed by Grand Duke Nikolai Nikolaevich, who had until August 1915 been the Supreme Commander of the Russian armed forces during World War I and since 1922 had resided in France.

Aside from anticommunism, the ROVS did not have an official political orientation and somewhat adhered to the old Russian military dictum: "The army is outside politics" (in Russian "Армия вне политики"). It believed that the political orientation of Russia could not be predetermined by émigrés living outside its borders (the philosophy of "non-predetermination" or in Russian "непредрешенчество"). Many but not all of its members had monarchist sympathies, but they were divided on whether the House of Romanov should return and whether the government should be autocratic or democratic.

=== Soviet infiltration ===
The ROVS, along with other similar Russian émigré organizations, became a prime target for the Soviet secret intelligence service, the OGPU. The OGPU even set up a fictitious anticommunist monarchist organization, the Monarchist Union of Central Russia, which was used to undermine the ROVS′s activities in the Soviet Union. The ROVS′s secret counter-intelligence branch, the "Inner Line" (in Russian "Внутренная Линия") set up by General Alexander Kutepov in the mid-1920s, was also severely compromised, among other things by suspected recruitment by the OGPU of Gen Nikolai Skoblin, a senior operative in the Inner Line.

Two of the ROVS's successive chairmen, General Alexander Kutepov and General Yevgeny Miller, were kidnapped by Soviet agents, in 1930 and 1937 respectively. Miller was brought to the Soviet Union and was interrogated and executed. General Fyodor Abramov, who succeeded Miller as chairman, had to quit the post shortly afterward and was expelled from Bulgaria, where he had resided, since his son was exposed as a Soviet agent. The OGPU′s successful operations against the ROVS, as well as infighting, intrigues, and antagonisms in the wider Russian émigré community, demoralised and rendered impotent an organisation. When World War II began in 1939, it had also become largely irrelevant because of the geopolitical realignment.

=== World War II ===
After the outbreak of the war, the ROVS was virtually paralysed, as the war split its leadership and membership into two opposing camps between those who advocated war against Germany or for it. General Alexei Arkhangelsky, who assumed the ROVS's presidency in March 1938, was personally pro-German, a stance opposed by such renowned émigré figures like General Anton Denikin.

During the war, the ROVS was split. The members in Nazi-occupied Europe were formally inducted under a different auspices of the ORVS, which de-facto was a re-branded German department. European ROVS members were extremely enthusiastic about Nazi Germany's war against the USSR, hoping to be recognized as allies by Hitler. This is why a few thousand ROVS members, acting as interpreters, engineers, doctors, and other auxiliaries, joined the ranks of the Wehrmacht and went to the Eastern Front. The reason was that, to the ROVS, that meant fighting against the Soviet power in any way possible.

According to a 1988 oral history interview with Nikita Ivanovich Yovich,

"Years passed, gradually people began dying off. In 1986, the most senior man still alive turned out to be Captain Ivanov who lived in Detroit. Captain Ivanov received a communication from Paris saying that as the most senior man he was now obliged to assume the presidency of the R.A.S.U. He was ninety-one. He needed a deputy and I was recommended to him. I received a letter from this Captain Ivanov whom I had never met, an official letter -- 'Dear Nikita Ivanovich, As of such and such a date, I have become the President of the Russian Armed Services Union. I am alone and am requesting your help.' And so I answered the letter, -- 'Dear Captain Ivanov: I was brought up to be a soldier -- that means, never volunteer for duty, but never shirk it.' A week later, I received orders from him, stating that as of such and such a date Lieutenant Nikita Ivanovich Yovich would be serving as his deputy. He gave me various orders, xeroxing lists and so forth, which I carried out. After a few years I began having problems with my health and I wrote to Captain Ivanov requesting to be relieved of my duties. I received no reply. I wrote again. All of a sudden I receive a letter saying that Captain Ivanov has had a stroke and is paralyzed. I phoned him, but there was no answer. And then I received orders from him, which he had somehow been able to sign -- I had been appointed president of the Russian Armed Services Union."

=== After Cold War ===
The ROVS continued to be active into the 1990s and had evolved into an organization that was principally concerned with the historical preservation of the precommunist and anticommunist Russian military tradition. In the ROVS's possession were a significant number of Russian imperial and White Army battle flags and standards, which were meant to be returned to Russia when "a national Russian army" was once again in existence.

Although its significance and influence in the Russian émigré community had ceased several decades earlier, the ROVS in 1992 became active in Russia itself. In the mid-1990s, however, since the communist regime had fallen and the Soviet Union no longer existed, a split emerged within the ROVS on whether to continue the organization's existence.

In 2000, Vladimir Vishnevsky, a US resident who was the ROVS chairman, requested a vote on this issue. The vast majority of ROVS members voted against its dissolution. Vishnevsky died of cancer that year and was succeeded by Igor Borisovich Ivanov.

=== Under Igor Ivanov ===
Under Ivanov, the ROVS not only was committed to the preservation of the history and tradition of pre-Soviet Russia but also appealed to the patriotic Russian public as well as the UN Organization for Security and Co-operation in Europe (OSCE), advocated for the resolute condemnation of communism. In his appeal, Ivanov insisted for a legal condemnation of the theory and the practice of communism as done with National Socialism in Germany. He accused OSCE and the PACE countries of having extremely inconsistency and half-heartedness in condemning communism and of being openly Russophobic by drafting resolutions addressing communism, particularly the preliminary version PACE Resolution No. 1481.

Ivanov himself is described as an ideological White Guard and is a sharp critic of the ruling authorities of the Russian Federation. In the past, he accused the ruling authorities of collapsing Russia’s economy and defense capability which he says they carried out under the guise of "military reform". He also criticized the ruling regime for pursuing an anti-national course in foreign and domestic policy and for taking a conciliatory and protective position regarding Soviet Russia’s communist heritage.

And though the ROVS official stance on the restoration of the monarchy has been reticent at best, he has often been in favor of the revival of the monarchy in Russia, though he warned against the premature and violent introduction of a monarchical form of government. Ivanov has also been a known opponent of totalitarianism and political extremism; both right and left, equally condemning the theory and practice of communism as well as national socialism (fascism) as anti-Christian and anti-human, thus being unacceptable for Orthodox Russia.

==== Russo-Ukrainian War ====
On April 15, 2014, under Ivanov’s command, the ROVS issued an appeal to members of the Armed Forces of Ukraine and called for the Ukrainian Army to be prevented from being drawn into further conflict to avoid bloodshed and escalation.

In June 2014, Ivanov and a detachment of ROVS volunteers deployed to Krasnodon, Luhansk Oblast, where they traveled to Sloviansk in the Donetsk Oblast. There, they met up with forces of the Donetsk People's Republic who were defending the city. By that time, Sloviansk had already become surrounded by Ukrainian forces and so the detachment took part in the defense of Sloviansk. In that campaign, Ivanov took command of a Separate Assault Company as a squad leader.

At one point, from July 1 to 4, during the fighting near Nikolaevka, Ivanov’s unit was surrounded but broke through and linked up with friendly forces back in Sloviansk.

On July 6, 2014, attached to the Slavic Brigade, Ivanov arrived in Donetsk and was appointed deputy commander of the 2nd infantry Slavic battalion (under the command of battalion commander V.P. Kononov stationed in Mospino and Ilovaisk. As deputy commander, Ivanov directly supervised the defense preparation of Ilovaisk against any offensives attempted by the Armed Forces of Ukraine.

As a result of his and his volunteers actions, Ivanov achieved the rank of Major and became the first head of the political department of the DPR militia. Though the ROVS volunteer detachment took part in the defense of Sloviansk, Ivanov, as head of the political department, pursued a policy of non-partisanship and advocated the revival of the traditions of the Russian Army in the ranks of the militia. One such reform was the order on humane treatment of prisoners.

After Igor Strelkov's resignation, Ivanov oversaw the transition of the DPR forces from a militia force into a professional regular Armed Forces. Under the order of the Minister of Defense V.P. Kononov, Ivanov was promoted to Deputy Chief of the Main Staff of the Armed Forces of the DPR for combat units.

Though Ivanov and the ROVS volunteers for a while made some progress in their reforms within the DPR militia, Prime Minister Alexander Zakharchenko shut down the program. As a result Ivanov filed a letter of resignation that cited the "changed political situation in the DPR." Together with a group of officers, members of the ROVS volunteer detachment and of those who decided to go with the ROVS detachment withdrew from the Donetsk People's Republic and returned to mainland Russia.

Upon his return to the Russian Federation, Ivanov declared that a coup had taken place within the Donetsk People's Republic with the removal Igor Strelkov and that since Strelkov’s removal, the ROVS could not condone the policies of the new DPR administration.

Since then, the ROVS has been organizing humanitarian aid programs in Donbass for those affected by the war including assistance to wounded militias as well as refugees.

== Organizational structure and membership ==
Before World War II, the ROVS was divided into departments (Russian: отделы), based on regions or/and countries:

- Department I — Great Britain, Netherlands, Denmark, Egypt, Spain, Italy, Norway, Iran, Poland, Syria, Finland, France and its colonies, Switzerland, Sweden;
- Department II — Austria, Hungary, Germany, Free City of Danzig, Latvia, Lithuania, Estonia;
- Department III — Bulgaria, Turkey;
- Department IV — Greece, Romania, Yugoslavia;
- Department V — Belgium;
- Department VI — Czechoslovakia;
- Far-Eastern Department with headquarters in Harbin;
- Short-lived Mongolian Department in Mongolia, later in Inner Mongolia and Xinjiang;
- North-American Department;
- Departments in Australia and New Zealand;
- South-American Department.

According to the data contained in the declassified UDBA documents of 1955, the ROVS had in 1934 a global membership that totaled 400,000 people, which included 206,000 people in Europe, 175,000 in the Far East and 25,000 in America.

== List of chairmen and commanders ==
- General Pyotr Wrangel (1924–1928) (as the commander of the Russian Army)
- Grand Duke General Nikolai Nikolaevich Romanov (1924–1929) (as the supreme commander of all Russian forces, in concurrence with General Wrangel)
- General Alexander Pavlovich Kutepov (1929–1930)
- General Yevgeny Karlovich Miller (1930–1937)
- General Feodor Feodorovich Abramov (1937–1938)
- General Alexei Petrovich Arkhangelsky (1938–1957)
- General Alexei Alexandrovich von Lampe (1957–1967)
- General Vladimir Grigorievich Zharzhevsky (1967–1979)
- Captain Vladimir Mikhail Osipov (1979–1983)
- Starshina Vladimir Ivanovich Diakov (1983–1984)
- Lieutenant Peter Alekseevich Kalenichenko (1984–1986)
- Captain Boris Mihailovich Ivanov (1986–1988)
- Sotnik Nikita Ivanovich Yovich (1988)
- Lieutenant Vladimir Vladimirovich Granitov (1988–1989)
- Captain Vladimir Nikolaevich Butkov (1989–2000)
- Lieutenant Vladimir Aleksandrovich Vishnevsky (2000)
- Major Igor Borisovich Ivanov (2000–)

== See also ==
- White émigré

== External sources ==
- Russian All-Military Union (rus)
- History of ROVS (rus)
- Pereklichka, live journal (ROVS) (rus)
