= American Expeditionary Forces =

Army-led formation of the U.S. Armed Forces on the Western Front of World War I

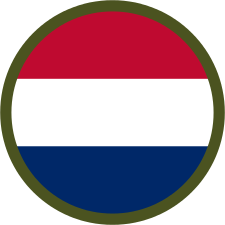
- G. H. Q. Distinctive Cloth Insignia
- Active: 1917–1920
- Disbanded: August 31, 1920
- Country: United States of America
- Branch: United States Army
- Role: Land combat
- Size: 2,057,675 men (1918)
- General Headquarters: Chaumont, Haute-Marne, France
- Engagements: See battles World War I and the Allied intervention in the Russian Civil War: Western Front; Battle of Cantigny; Battle of Cambrai; German spring offensive; Third Battle of the Aisne; Second Battle of the Marne; Battle of Soissons; Hundred Days Offensive; Battle of Saint-Mihiel; Second Battle of the Somme; Meuse–Argonne offensive; Occupation of the Rhineland; Italian Front; Second Battle of the Piave River; Battle of Vittorio Veneto; Occupation of the eastern Adriatic; North Russia intervention; Battle of Tulgas; Vaga River front; Battle of Ust-Padenga; Battle of Shenkursk; Battle of Vystavka; Battle of Bolshie Ozerki; Siberian intervention; Battle of Romanovka; Suchan Valley Campaign; Battle of Novo Litovoskaya; Battle of Posolskeya

Commanders
- Commander in Chief: General of the Armies John J. Pershing
- Commander of the Services of Supply: Major General James Harbord
- Chief of the Army Air Service: Major General Mason M. Patrick

The American Expeditionary Forces (AEF) (Note: 'The military units sent overseas by the U.S. government were designated as the American Expeditionary Forces (AEF) in 1917. The AEF is often cited incorrectly as the "American Expeditionary Force." The AEF consisted of American troops not only on the Western Front but also in Great Britain, Italy, Poland, and Russia, hence the use of the word "Forces.") was a formation of the United States Armed Forces on the Western Front during World War I, composed mostly of units from the U.S. Army. The AEF was established on July 5, 1917, in Chaumont, France, under the command of Major General John J. Pershing. It fought alongside French Army, British Army, Canadian Expeditionary Force, British Indian Army, New Zealand Expeditionary Force and Australian Army units against the Imperial German Army. A small number of AEF troops also fought alongside Italian Army units in 1918 against the Austro-Hungarian Army. The AEF helped the French Army on the Western Front during the Aisne Offensive (at the Battle of Château-Thierry and Battle of Belleau Wood) in the summer of 1918, and fought its major actions in the Battle of Saint-Mihiel and the Meuse-Argonne Offensive in the latter part of 1918.

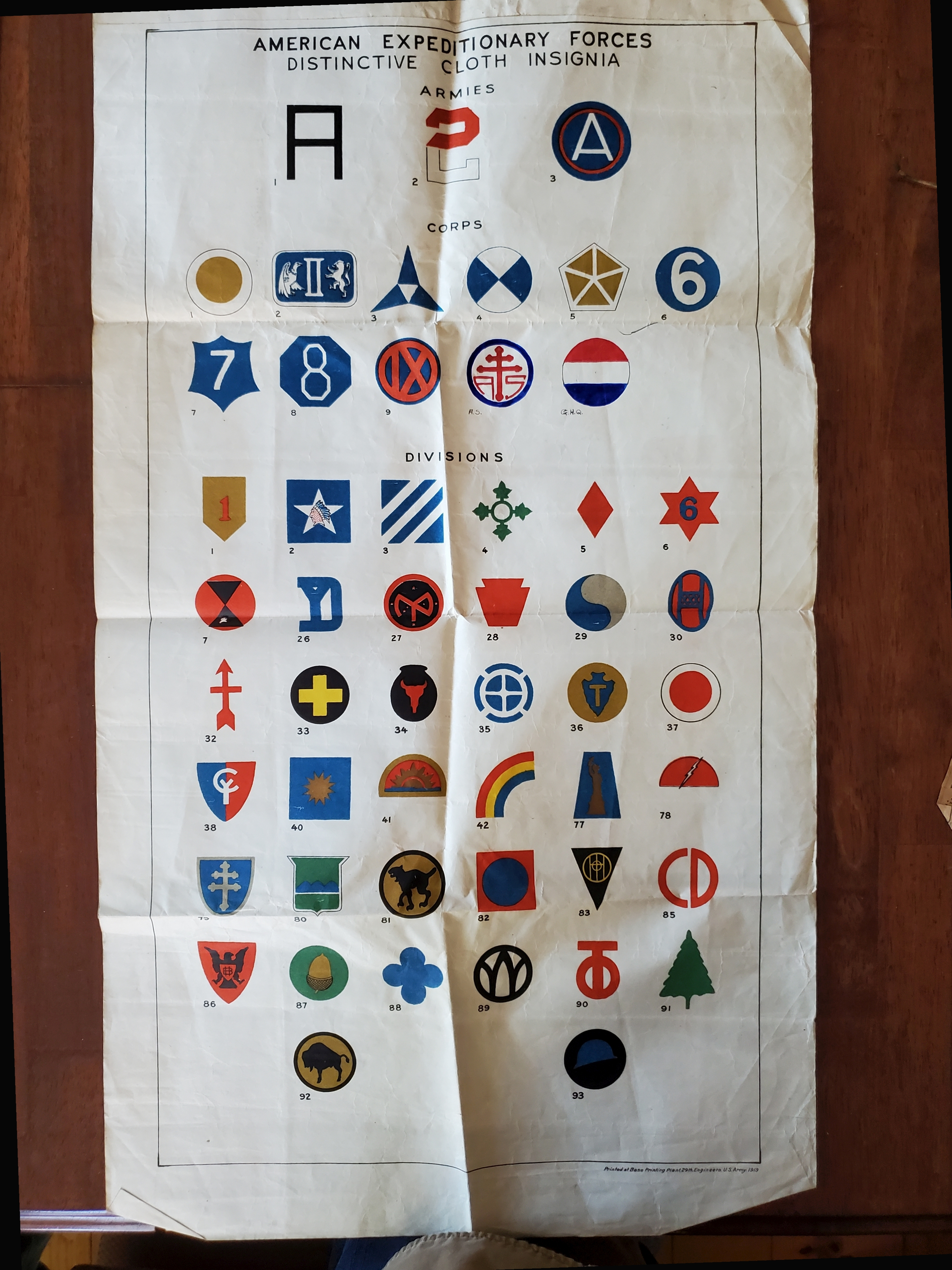
American Expeditionary Forces Distinctive Cloth Insignia Chart (1919).

== Formation ==
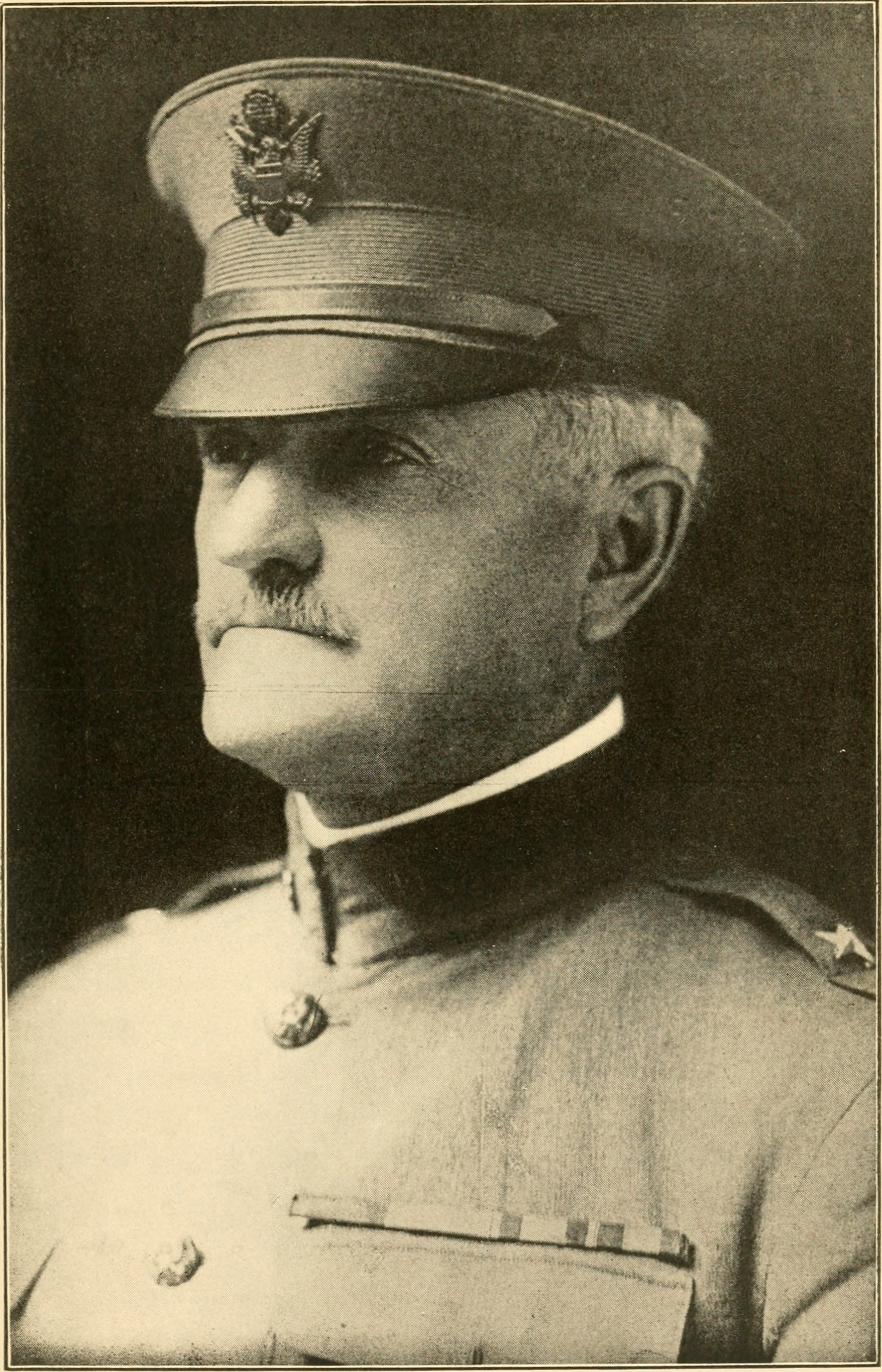
American Expeditionary Forces Commander in Chief, General John J. Pershing in 1917.

President Woodrow Wilson initially planned to give command of the AEF to Gen. Frederick Funston, but after Funston's sudden death in February 1917, Wilson appointed Major General John J. Pershing in May, and Pershing remained in command for the rest of the war. Pershing insisted that American soldiers be well-trained before going to Europe. As a result, few troops arrived before January 1918. In addition, Pershing insisted that the American force would not be used merely to fill gaps in the French and British armies, and he resisted European efforts to have U.S. troops deployed as individual replacements in depleted Allied units. This approach was not always well received by the western Allied leaders who distrusted the potential of an army lacking experience in large-scale warfare. In addition, the British government tried to use its spare shipping as leverage to bring US soldiers under British operational control.

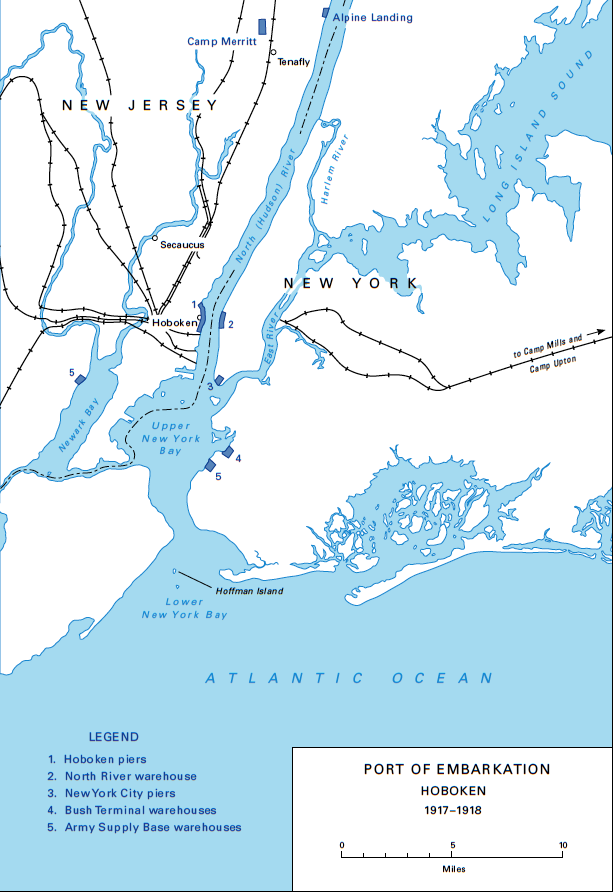
Map, Port of Embarkation Hoboken (1917–18).

By June 1917, only 14,000 American soldiers had arrived in France, and the AEF had only a minor participation at the front up to late October 1917, but by May 1918 over one million American troops were stationed in France, with half of them fighting on the front lines. Since the transport ships needed to bring American troops to Europe were scarce at the beginning, the U.S. Army pressed into service passenger liners, seized German ships, and borrowed Allied ships to transport American soldiers from the Hoboken Port of Embarkation with facilities in New York City and New Jersey, and the Newport News Port of Embarkation in Virginia. The mobilization effort taxed the American military to the limit and required new organizational strategies and command structures to transport great numbers of troops and supplies quickly and efficiently. The French harbors of Bordeaux, La Pallice, Saint Nazaire, and Brest became the entry points into the French railway system that brought the American troops and their supplies to the Western Front. American engineers in France also built 82 new ship berths, nearly 1,000 miles (1,600 km) of additional standard-gauge tracks, and over 100,000 miles (160,000 km) of telephone and telegraph lines.

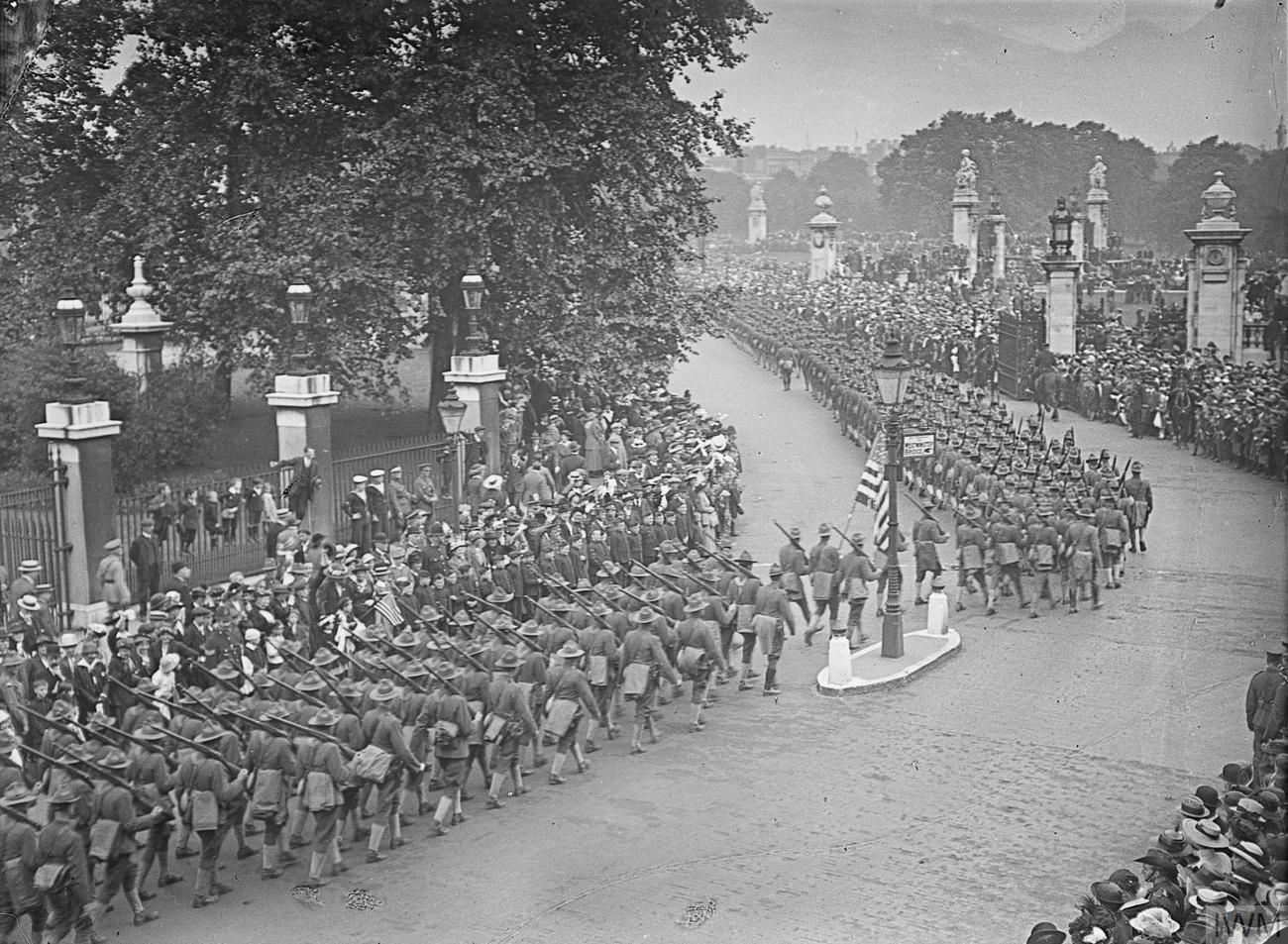
Column of American troops passing Buckingham Palace, London, 1917.

The first American troops, who were often called "Doughboys," landed in Europe in June 1917. The AEF did not participate at the front until October 23, 1917, when the 1st Division fired the first American shell of the war toward German lines, although they participated only on a small scale. A group of regular soldiers and the first American division to arrive in France, entered the trenches near Nancy, France, in Lorraine.

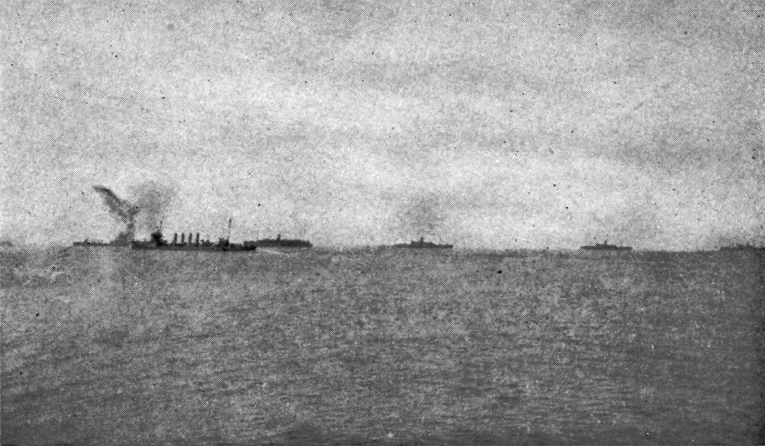
With America's first convoy. The troop ships are Henderson, Antilles, Momus, and Lenape.

I Corps was officially activated in France, under the AEF, from January 15, 1918. It included the 1st, 2nd, 26th, 32nd, 41st and 42nd Divisions. (4th Brigade, US Marine Corps, was included as part of 2nd Division.) II Corps was activated on February 24, by which time troop numbers justified it. Initially II Corps consisted of the 27th, 30th, 33rd, 78th and 80th Divisions.

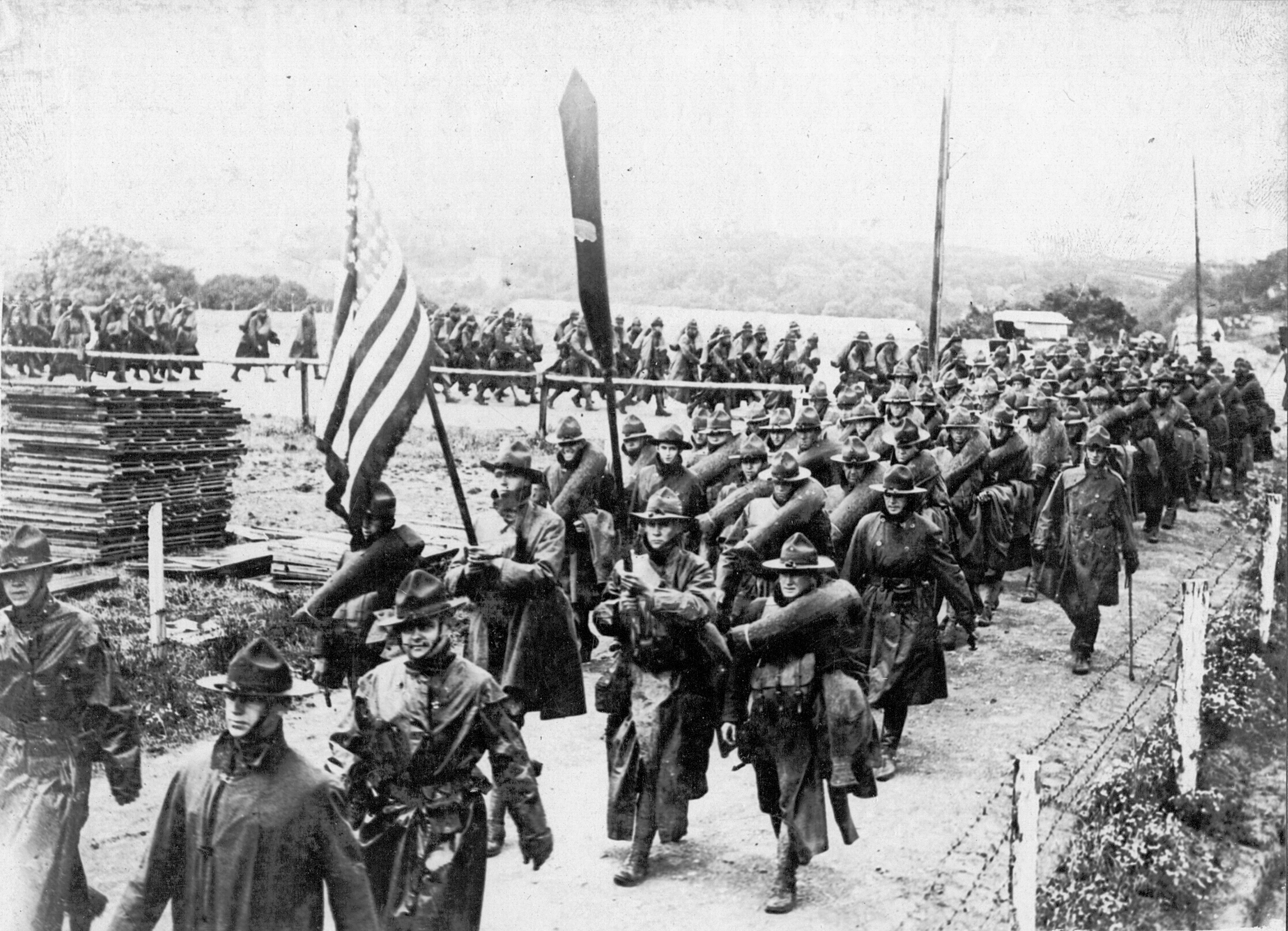
A detachment of American soldiers departing for the front in Le Havre, France, on July 12, 1918.

In June 1918, many component infantry units from II Corps – commanded by Maj.-Gen. George W. Read – were attached to veteran British Army or Australian Army units. This served two purposes: familiarizing the Americans with actual battlefield conditions in France, and temporarily reinforcing the British Empire units that were often severely-depleted in numbers, after more than three years of fighting. In fact, the first major operation in World War I to involve US troops concerned individual infantry platoons of the 33rd Division, which were attached to battalions of the Australian Corps for the Battle of Hamel on the 4th of July. Their involvement was voluntary and occurred despite last-minute orders from AEF headquarters, that its troops should not take part in offensive operations led by non-US generals. Thus Hamel was historically significant as the first major offensive operation during the war to involve US infantry.

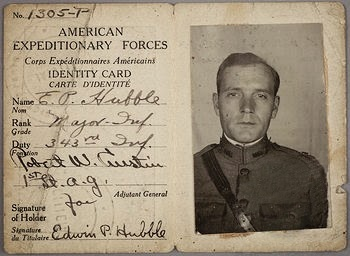
AEF officer's identity card belonging to Edwin Hubble, 1918

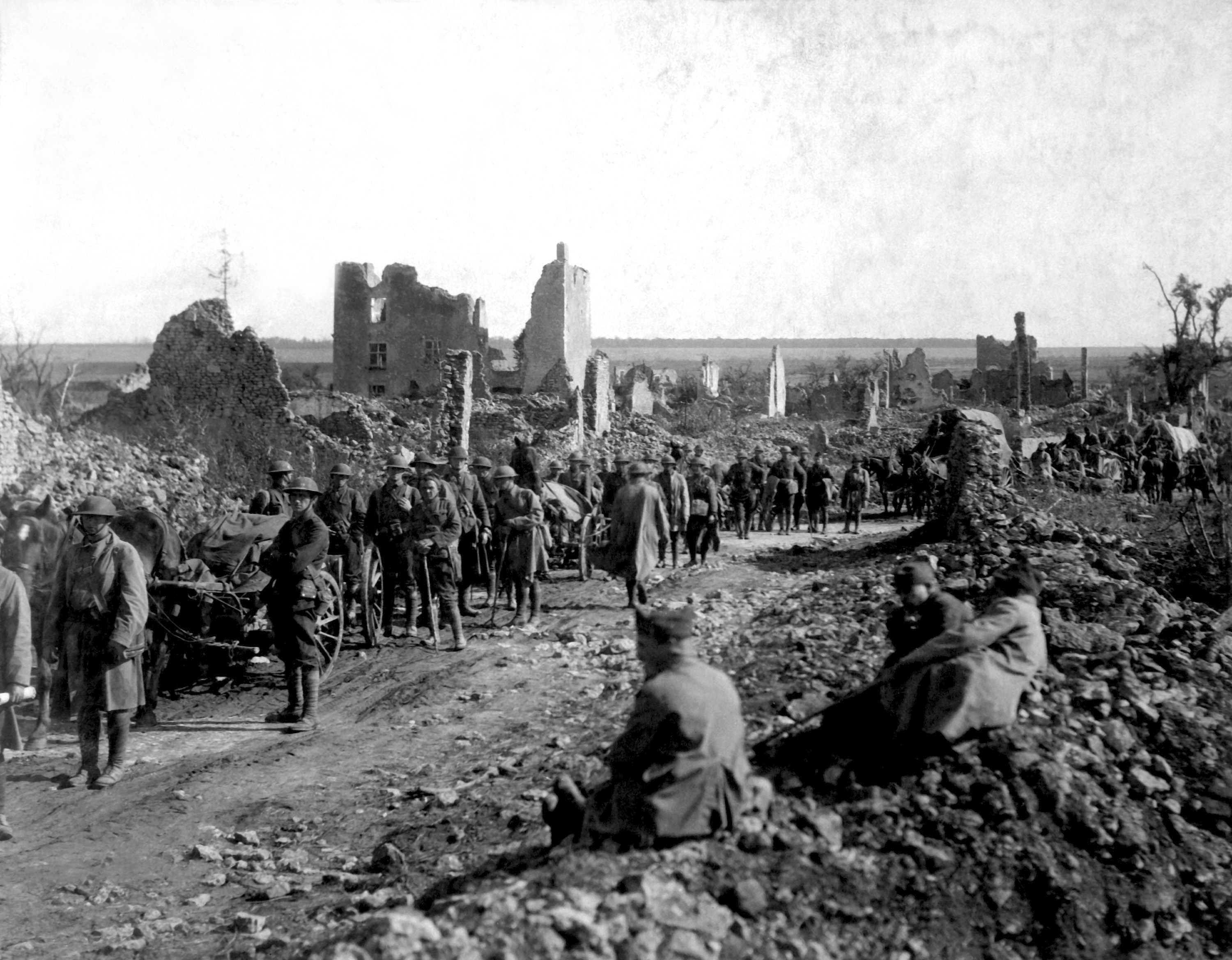
Men of the 18th Machine Gun Battalion passing through St. Baussant in advance upon St. Mihiel, September 13, 1918.

The AEF used French and British equipment. Particularly appreciated were the French canon de 75 modèle 1897, the canon de 155 C modèle 1917 Schneider, and the canon de 155mm GPF. American aviation units received the SPAD XIII and Nieuport 28 fighters, and the U.S. Army tank corps used French Renault FT light tanks. Pershing established facilities in France to train new arrivals with their new weapons. By the end of 1917, four divisions were deployed in a large training area near Verdun: the 1st Division, a regular army formation; the 26th Division, a National Guard division; the 2nd Division, a combination of regular troops and U.S. Marines; and the 42nd "Rainbow" Division, a National Guard division made up of soldiers from nearly every state in the United States. The fifth division, the 41st Division, was converted into a depot division near Tours.

=== Logistics ===
Logistic operations were under the direction of Chicago banker Charles G. Dawes, with the rank first of colonel and then brigadier general. Dawes reported directly to Gen. Pershing. Dawes recommended in May 1918 that the allies set up a joint logistics planning board, which was approved by the Allies in the form of the Military Board of Allied Supply (MBAS), which coordinated logistics and transportation on the Western and Italian fronts.

Supporting the two million soldiers across the Atlantic Ocean was a massive logistical enterprise. In order to be successful, the Americans needed to create a coherent support structure with very little institutional knowledge. The AEF developed support network appropriate for the huge size of the American force. It rested upon the Services of Supply in the rear areas, with ports, railroads, depots, schools, maintenance facilities, bakeries, clothing repair shops (termed salvage), replacement depots, ice plants, and a wide variety of other activities.

The Services of Supply initiated support techniques that would last well into the Cold War including forward maintenance, field cooking, graves registration (mortuary affairs), host nation support, motor transport, and morale services. The work of the logisticians enabled the success of the AEF and contributed to the emergence of the American Army as a modern fighting force.

=== African Americans ===
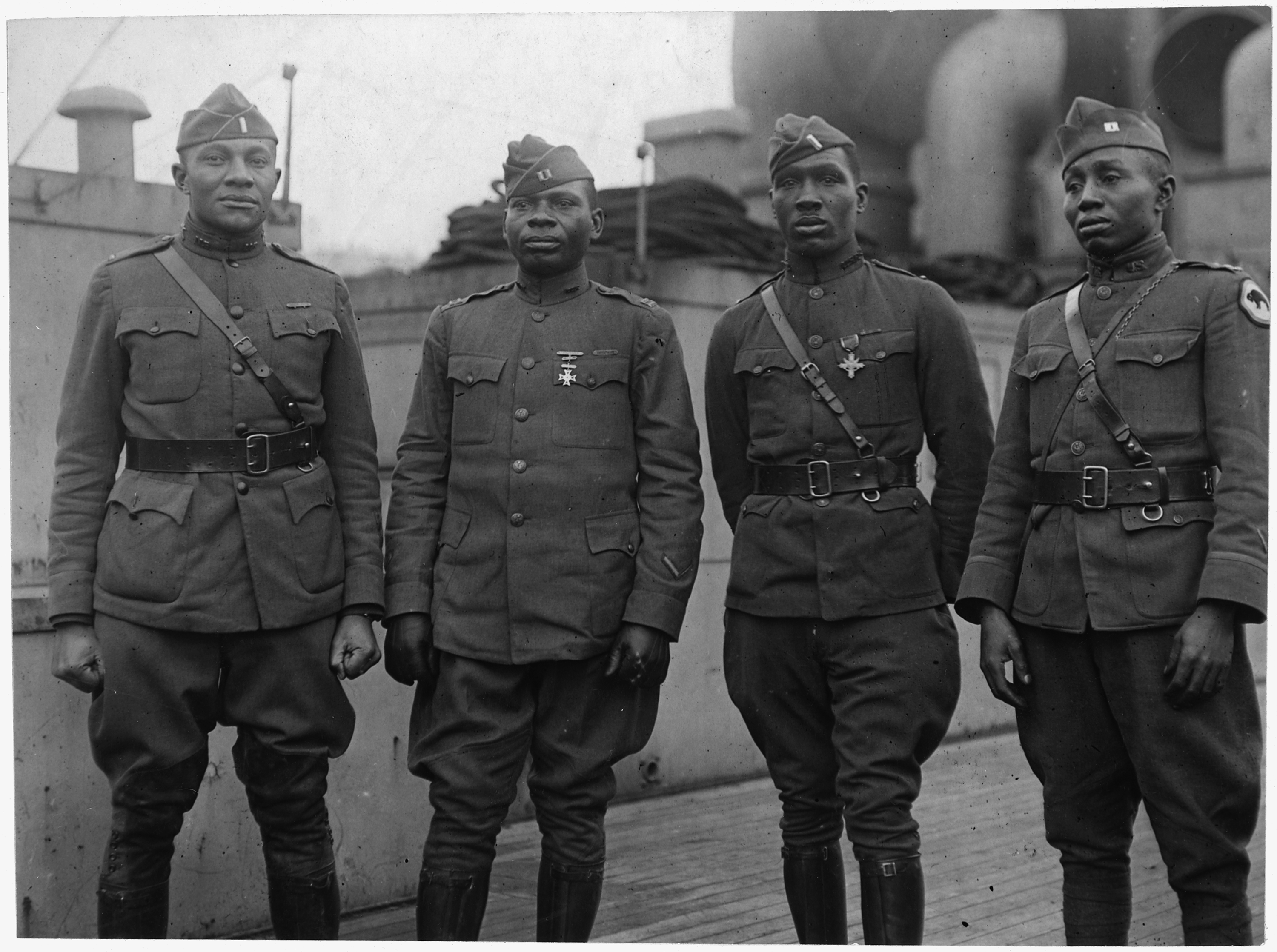
Officers of the 366th Infantry, 1919

African Americans were drafted on the same basis as whites and made up 13 percent of the draftees. By the end of the war, over 350,000 African-Americans had served in AEF units on the Western Front. However, they were assigned to segregated units commanded by white officers. African-American troops were often subjected to discrimination and harassment in the United States. In 1917, a mutiny and riot erupted in Houston (Texas) involving 156 soldiers from the all-black 24th Infantry Regiment. The incident occurred within a climate of overt racist hostility from members of the all-white Houston Police Department (HPD) against members of the local black community and black soldiers stationed at Camp Logan. Following an incident where police officers arrested and assaulted black soldiers, many of their comrades mutinied and marched to Houston. There they opened fire and killed eleven civilians (including a minor, Fred E. Winkler) and five policemen. Five soldiers also died, (four to friendly fire and one from suicide). In accordance with the military laws of the time, 118 soldiers were tried in three courts-martial. A total of 110 were convicted, of whom 19 were executed and 63 were sentenced to life imprisonment.

One fifth of the black soldiers sent to France saw combat, compared to two-thirds of the whites. They were three percent of AEF combat forces, and under two percent of battlefield fatalities. "The mass of the colored drafted men cannot be used for combatant troops", said a General Staff report in 1918, and it recommended that "these colored drafted men be organized in reserve labor battalions." They handled unskilled labor tasks as stevedores in the Atlantic ports and common laborers at the camps and in the Services of the Rear in France. The French, whose front-line troops were resisting combat duties to the point of mutiny, requested and received control of several regiments of black combat troops. Kennedy reports "Units of the black 92nd Division particularly suffered from poor preparation and the breakdown in command control. As the only black combat division, the 92nd Division entered the line with unique liabilities. It had been deliberately dispersed throughout several camps during its stateside training; some of its artillery units were summoned to France before they had completed their courses of instruction, and were never fully equipped until after the Armistice; nearly all its senior white officers scorned the men under their command and repeatedly asked to be transferred. The black enlisted men were frequently diverted from their already attenuated training opportunities in France in the summer of 1918 and put to work as stevedores and common laborers."

The 369th, 370th, 371st, and 372nd Infantry Regiments (nominally the 93d Division, but never consolidated as such) served with distinction under French command with French colonial units in front-line combat. The French did not harbor the same levels of disdain based on skin color and for many Americans of African descent it was a liberating and refreshing experience. These African-American soldiers wore American uniforms, some dating from the time of the Union Army, with French helmets and were armed with French Model 1907/15 Berthier rifle manufactured by Remington Arms, rather than the M1903 Springfield or M1917 Enfield rifles issued to most American soldiers. One of the most distinguished units was the 369th Infantry Regiment, known as the Harlem Hellfighters. The 369th was on the front lines for six months, longer than any other African-American regiment in the war. One hundred seventy-one members of the 369th were awarded the Legion of Merit. One member of the 369th, Sergeant Henry Johnson, was awarded the French Croix de guerre, and posthumously the Medal of Honor.

== Actions during World War I ==
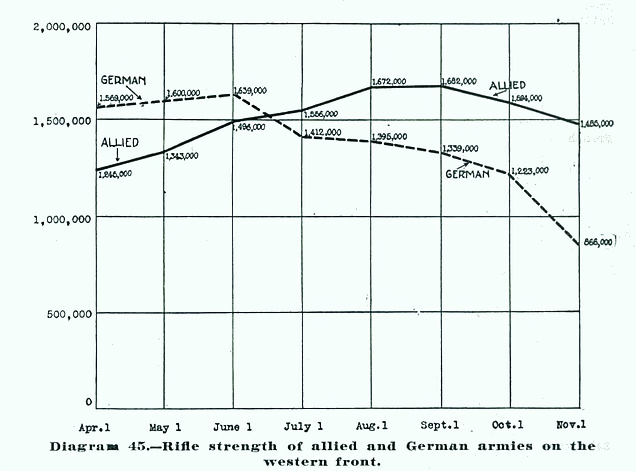
Allies gain overwhelming superiority in front-line rifle strength as American soldiers arrive in the summer

At the beginning, during the spring of 1918, the four battle-ready U.S. divisions were deployed under French and British command to gain combat experience by defending relatively quiet sectors of their lines. After the first offensive action and American-led AEF victory on May 28, 1918, at the Battle of Cantigny, by the U.S. 1st Division, and a similar local action by the 2nd Division at Belleau Wood beginning June 6, both while assigned under French Corps command, Pershing worked towards the deployment of an independent US field Army. The rest followed at an accelerating pace during the spring and summer of 1918. By June Americans were arriving in-theater at the rate of 10,000 a day; most of which entered training by British, Canadian and Australian battle-experienced officers and senior non-commissioned ranks. The training took a minimum of six weeks due to the inexperience of the servicemen.

The first offensive action by AEF units serving under non-American command was 1,000 men (four companies from the 33d Division), with the Australian Corps during the Battle of Hamel on July 4, 1918. (Corporal Thomas A. Pope was awarded the Medal of Honor for this battle.) This battle took place under the overall command of the Australian Corps commander, Lt. Gen. Sir John Monash. The Allied force in this battle combined artillery, armor, infantry, and air support (combined arms), which served as a blueprint for all subsequent Allied attacks, using "tanks".

Major General John A. Lejeune pinning the Croix de Guerre (French War Cross) on Private E. C. McCormick on January 4, 1919.

U.S. Army and Marine Corps troops played a key role in helping stop the German thrust towards Paris, during the Second Battle of the Marne in June 1918 (at the Battle of Château-Thierry (1918) and the Battle of Belleau Wood). The first major and distinctly American offensive was the reduction of the Saint Mihiel salient during September 1918. During the Battle of Saint-Mihiel, Pershing commanded the U.S. First Army, composed of seven divisions and more than 500,000 men, in the largest offensive operation ever undertaken by United States armed forces. This successful offensive was followed by the Meuse-Argonne offensive, lasting from September 26 to November 11, 1918, during which Pershing commanded more than one million American and French combatants. In these two military operations, Allied forces recovered more than 200 sq mi (488 km^{2}) of French territory from the German army. By the time the World War I Armistice had suspended all combat on November 11, 1918, the American Expeditionary Forces had evolved into a modern, combat-tested army.

Late in the war, American units ultimately fought in two other theaters at the request of the European powers. Pershing sent troops of the 332d Infantry Regiment to Italy, and President Wilson agreed to send some troops, the 27th and 339th Infantry Regiments, to Russia. These latter two were known as the American Expeditionary Force Siberia, and the American Expeditionary Force North Russia.

== Commanders and senior staff ==
Name	Photo	Date
Commander-in-Chief
General of the Armies John J. Pershing		May 26, 1917 - August 31, 1920
Chief of Staff
Brigadier General James Harbord		May 26, 1917 - May 6, 1918
Major General James W. McAndrew		May 6, 1918 - May 27, 1919
Major General James Harbord		May 27, 1919 - August 12, 1919
Brigadier General Fox Conner		August 12, 1919 - August 31, 1920
Deputy Chief of Staff
Brigadier General LeRoy Eltinge		May 1, 1918 - June 30, 1919
Assistant Chief of Staff, G1 (Administration)
Colonel James A. Logan Jr.		July 5, 1917 - August 19, 1918
Brigadier General Avery D. Andrews		August 19, 1918 - April 23, 1919
Colonel Charles S. Lincoln		April 23, 1919 - June 1, 1919
Assistant Chief of Staff, G2 (Intelligence)
Brigadier General Dennis E. Nolan	boarder	July 5, 1917 - July 6, 1919
Colonel Aristides Moreno		July 6, 1919 - August 15, 1920
Assistant Chief of Staff, G3 (Operations)
Colonel John McAuley Palmer	boarder	July 5, 1917 - December 19, 1917
Brigadier General Fox Conner		December 19, 1917 - August 12, 1919
Lieutenant Colonel Albert S. Keugle		August 12, 1919 - August 15, 1920
Assistant Chief of Staff, G4 (Supply)
Colonel William D. Connor		August 11, 1917 - April 30, 1918
Brigadier General George Van Horn Moseley		April 30, 1918 - June 5, 1919
Assistant Chief of Staff, G5 (Training)
Colonel Paul B. Malone		August 11, 1917 - February 14, 1918
Brigadier General Harold B. Fiske		February 14, 1918 - July 10, 1919
Secretary of the General Staff
Colonel Frank R. McCoy		September 3, 1917 - May 1, 1918
Lieutenant Colonel James Lawton Collins		May 1, 1918 - October 23, 1918
Lieutenant Colonel Thomas W. Hammond		October 23, 1918 - November 2, 1918
Lieutenant Colonel Albert S. Keugle		November 2, 1918 - December 10, 1918
Lieutenant Colonel Thomas W. Hammond		December 10, 1918 - December 28, 1918
Colonel James Lawton Collins		December 28, 1918 - July 25, 1919
Adjutant General
Brigadier General Benjamin Alvord Jr.		May 26, 1917 - May 1, 1918
Brigadier General Robert C. Davis		May 1, 1918 - August 31, 1920
Judge Advocate
Brigadier General Walter Augustus Bethel		May 26, 1917 - August 15, 1920
Inspector General
Major General Andre W. Brewster		May 26, 1917 - August 15, 1920
Chief Quartermaster
Colonel Daniel E. McCarthy		May 26, 1917 - August 13, 1917
Major General Harry L. Rogers		August 13, 1917 - January 22, 1919
Brigadier General John M. Carson Jr.		January 22, 1919 - April 10, 1919
Colonel John T. Knight		April 10, 1919 - August 31, 1919
Chief Surgeon
Brigadier General Alfred E. Bradley		May 26, 1917 - May 1, 1918
Major General Merritte W. Ireland		May 1, 1918 - October 10, 1918
Brigadier General Walter McCaw		October 10, 1918 - July 16, 1919
Colonel Clarence J. Manly		July 16, 1919 - August 31, 1919
Chief Ordnance Officer
Brigadier General Clarence C. Williams		May 26, 1917 - May 5, 1918
Brigadier General Charles B. Wheeler		May 5, 1918 - October 9, 1918
Brigadier General John H. Rice		October 9, 1918 - August 13, 1919
Colonel Edwin D. Bricker		August 13, 1919 - August 31, 1919
Chief Engineer Officer
Brigadier General Harry Taylor		May 26, 1917 - July 11, 1918
Major General William C. Langfitt		July 11, 1918 - July 16, 1919
Colonel Thomas H. Jackson		July 16, 1919 - August 31, 1919
Chief Signal Officer
Brigadier General Edgar Russel		May 26, 1917 - July 11, 1919
Colonel Roy H. Coles		July 11, 1919 - August 31, 1919
Chief of Air Service
Major Townsend F. Dodd		May 26, 1917 - June 30, 1917
Lieutenant Colonel William L. Mitchell		June 30, 1917 - August 26, 1917
Brigadier General William L. Kenly		August 26, 1917 - November 27, 1917
Brigadier General Benjamin Foulois		November 27, 1917 - May 29, 1918
Major General Mason Patrick		May 29, 1918 - August 31, 1919
Provost Marshal General
Lieutenant Colonel Hanson E. Ely		July 20, 1917 - August 26, 1917
Brigadier General William H. Allaire Jr.		August 26, 1917 - September 25, 1918
Brigadier General Harry H. Bandholtz		September 25, 1918 - August 31, 1919
General Purchasing Agent
Brigadier General Charles G. Dawes		August 30, 1917 - June 30, 1919
Chief of Chemical Warfare Service
Brigadier General Amos Fries		September 3, 1917 - November 29, 1918
Colonel Edward N. Johnston		November 29, 1918 - July 5, 1919
Director General of Transportation
Brigadier General William W. Atterbury		September 14, 1917 - May 16, 1919
Brigadier General Frank R. McCoy		May 16, 1919 - August 4, 1919
Brigadier General Sherwood Cheney		August 4, 1919 - August 31, 1919
Director of Motor Transportation
Colonel Francis H. Pope		December 8, 1917 - July 9, 1918
Brigadier General Meriwether L. Walker		July 9, 1918 - August 13, 1919
Colonel Edgar S. Stayer		August 13, 1919 - August 31, 1919
Chief of Tank Corps
Brigadier General Samuel D. Rockenbach		December 23, 1917 - May 24, 1919
Chief of Artillery
Major General Ernest Hinds		April 29, 1918 - June 12, 1919

== Casualties ==
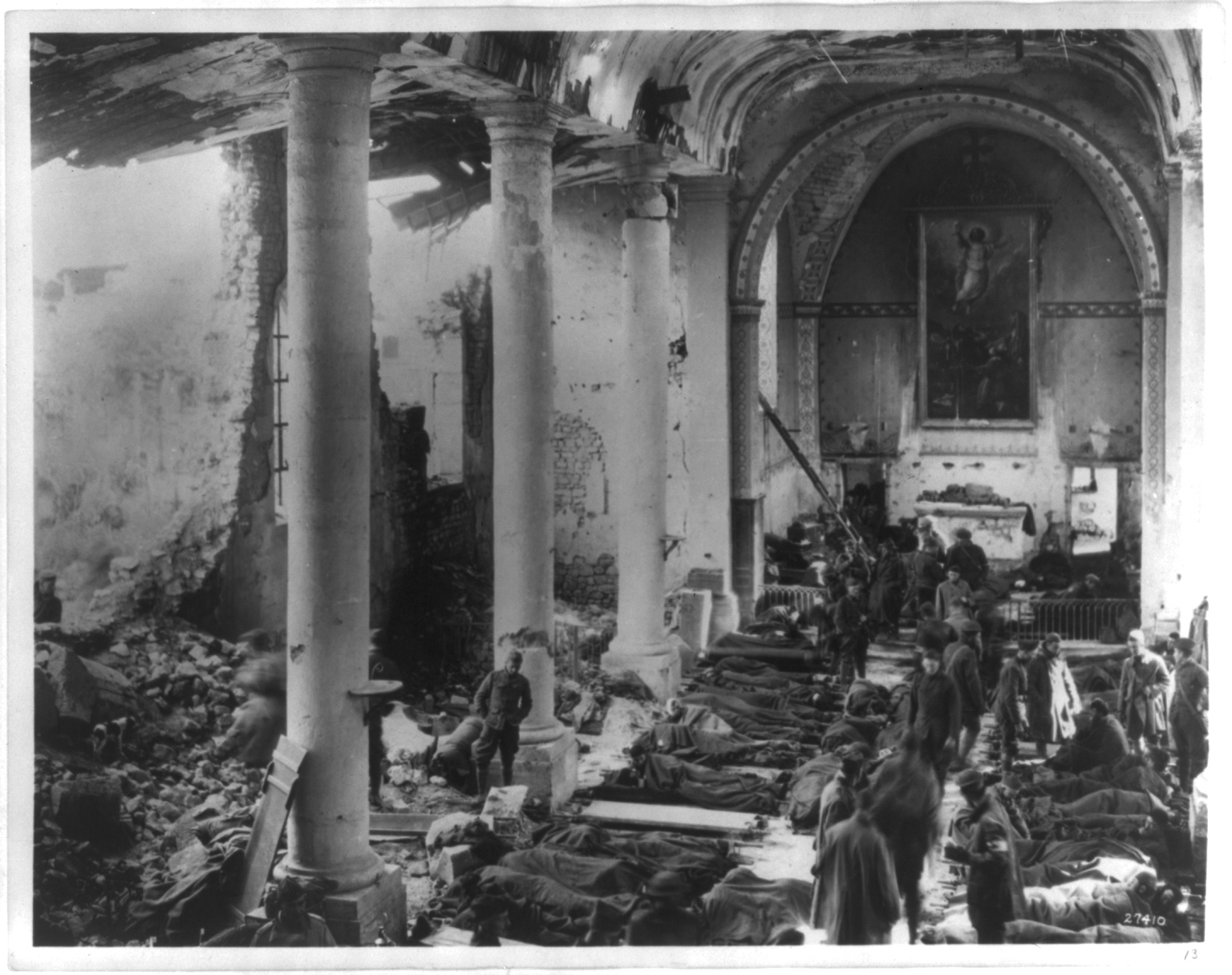
Army field hospital in France, 1918

The AEF sustained about 320,000 casualties: 53,402 battle deaths, 63,114 noncombat deaths and 204,000 wounded. Relatively few men suffered actual injury from poison gas, although much larger numbers mistakenly thought that they had been exposed. The 1918 influenza pandemic in late 1918 raged in the U.S. and France, where it took the lives of more than 25,000 men with the AEF, while another 360,000 became gravely ill.

== Demobilization ==
American soldiers parading along the main street of Winchester on Armistice Day, November 11, 1918

After the Armistice of November 11, 1918 thousands of Americans were sent home and demobilized. On July 27, 1919, the number of soldiers discharged amounted to 3,028,487 members of the military, and only 745,845 left in the American Expeditionary Forces.

== American Expeditionary Forces University at Beaune ==
The AEF established the American Expeditionary Forces University at Beaune, complete with its own chapter of Phi Beta Kappa. Faculty included Walter M. Chandler, a Progressive Party member and, later, a Republican Party member of the U.S. House of Representatives from the State of New York. Botanist Edwin Blake Payson was also an instructor there. Rudolph Hjalmar Gjelsness served as librarian.

== See also ==
- Bonus Army
- Formations of the United States Army during World War I

== Sources ==
- Arizona Republican (July 27, 1919). "Only 745,845 men in Army July 22". Arizona Republican. Phoenix, Arizona: Republican Pub. Co. pp. 1–28. ISSN 2157-135X. OCLC 2612512.
- Richmond Times-Dispatch (July 27, 1919). "3,028,487 Are Discharged". Richmond Times-Dispatch. Richmond, Virginia: Times Dispatch Pub. Co. pp. 1–52. ISSN 2333-7761. OCLC 9493729.
