= Battle of Bolshie Ozerki =

Battle during the Russian Civil War

- Part of the Allied North Russia Intervention during the Russian Civil War
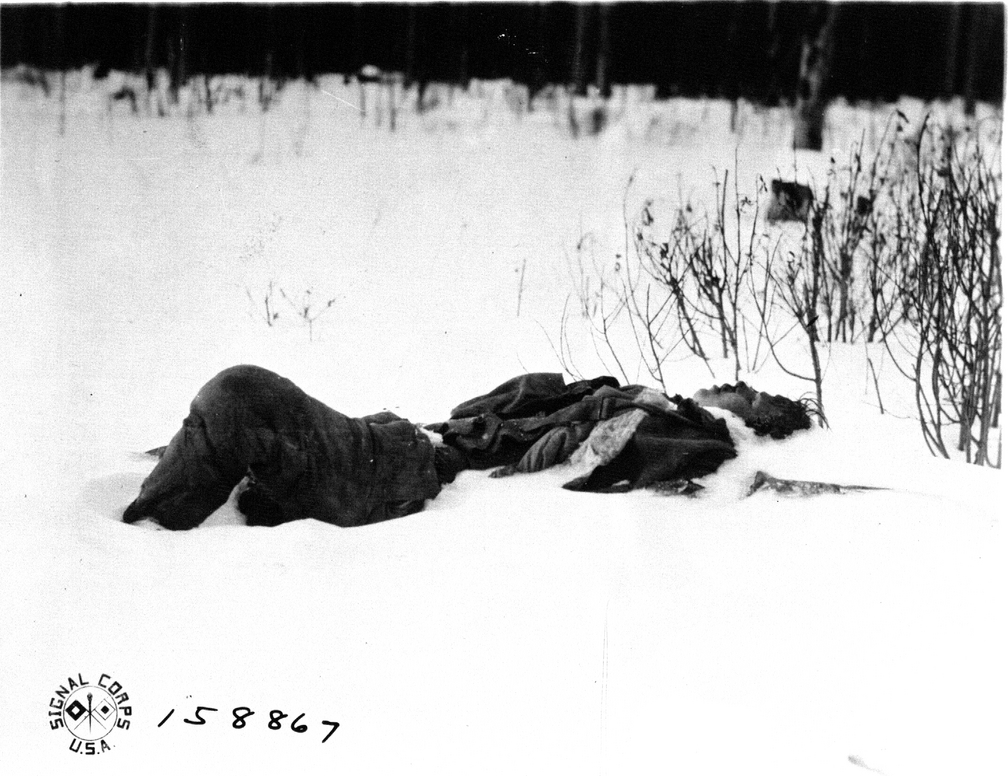
- A Workers' and Peasants' Red Army soldier that was killed during an attempted flank attack on Allied positions along the Obozerskaya road at Verst 16. April 8, 1919
Date	31 March – 2 April 1919
Location	Bolshie Ozerki, Arkhangelsk Oblast, Russia
Result	White and allies victory

Belligerents
United Kingdom; United States; Northern Russia (Second Polish Republic) Poland	(Russian Soviet Federative Socialist Republic) Russian SFSR

Commanders and leaders
(United Kingdom) Edmund Ironside (United States) George Evans Stewart	(Russian Soviet Federative Socialist Republic) Aleksandr Samoylo

Strength
~2,000	~7,000

Casualties and losses
At least 75 killed	~2,000 (Allied claim)

The Battle of Bolshie Ozerki was a major engagement fought during the Allied North Russia Intervention in the Russian Civil War. Beginning on March 31, 1919, a force of British, American, Polish, and White Russian troops engaged several Red Army partisan regiments at the village of Bolshie Ozerki. Although the initial Allied attacks were repelled, the outnumbered Allies managed to repel the Soviet flanking attempts that followed and the Red Army was later ordered to withdraw. Allied forces began to withdraw rapidly from northern Russia shortly thereafter.

The battle was the last engagement of British forces in the intervention. It was also one of the last significant engagements to involve American forces. Two months later, American forces of the Siberian Intervention successfully defended their camp from a Red attack at Romanovka by forces that greatly outnumbered them. The following month, they inflicted hundreds of casualties during the Suchan Valley Campaign.

== Background ==
Bolshie Ozerki was a small village situated between the port city of Onega and an important Allied position at Obozerskaya Station, along the Arkhangelsk-Vologda railroad. Because the port of the main Allied base at Arkhangelsk froze every winter, reinforcements had to be brought overland to the front line from the port of Murmansk, which did not freeze. The road linking Murmansk to Obozerskaya ran through Bolshie Ozerki, so when the British 6th Battalion, Yorkshire Regiment ("Green Howards") was dispatched to the front, the Red Army decided to seize the village in order to prevent the British column from reaching Obozerskaya. After destroying the British column and taking control of the railroad, the Red Army would then proceed by clearing the way to Arkhangelsk, which would then be taken.

Several skirmishes occurred at Bolshie Ozerki immediately before the main battle, which began on March 31. The first occurred on March 17, when a Red Army ski detachment led by Osip Palkin reconnoitered the village's defenses. Stealthily, the Reds captured two sentries and learned the precise locations of the Allied positions. Armed with this information, Commander Petr A. Solodukhin's brigade of 600 to 800 men attacked and overwhelmed between 80 and 160 French and White Russian troops garrisoning the village, capturing the outpost intact. On the following day the Allies launched an abortive counterattack. The 6th Red Army commander, Major General Aleksandr Samoilo, ordered his men to cease all offensive operations on the same day, citing shortages of warm gear and other necessities, the tenuous hold Commander Solodukhin (who had not captured every building) had on the village, and reports of troops in other sectors being frozen to death or frostbitten by bitter −30 °C (−22 °F) temperatures. Samoilo issued orders for the 6th Army to resume offensive operations on March 25, but the Red Army commander-in-chief, Colonel Ioakim I. Vatsetis, countermanded it "because of the severe frost."

On March 23, about 320 British soldiers from the 6th Battalion, Yorkshire Regiment and 70 American troops from Company H, 339th Infantry Regiment launched coordinated attacks on Bolshie Ozerki from positions west of the village. Waist-deep snow, which prevented the Allies from charging, and heavy enemy machine gun fire repulsed the attack. Simultaneously, 300 White Russians and between 40 and 80 British soldiers assaulted the eastern approaches along the road, also foundering in the face of effective enemy withering fire. Company E, 339th Infantry attempted to flank the enemy defenses by skirting through the forest north of the road. However, the movement required the unit to cover three miles of snow-covered forest in four hours time. Exhausted from already marching ten miles and hampered by awkward Shackleton boots (canvas and leather footwear with smooth soles and low heels designed by the Antarctic explorer Sir Ernest Shackleton, they were extremely slippery on ice or packed snow and generally considered inferior to the natives' felt boots by the Allies), the Americans failed to traverse the forest in time and were ordered to return. The Allies lost about 75 men as result of the two attacks. General Edmund Ironside, who had personally taken command in the sector, ordered an artillery bombardment of Bolshie Ozerki. With the village mostly destroyed by March 25, General Ironside returned to Arkhangelsk.

Despite the weather, both sides continued to bring up reinforcements. The Allies constructed a series of wooden blockhouses, log barricades, and troop shelters at a site about 4 miles east of the village on the road to Obozerskaya, which was 12 miles further east. By the end of March, the Allies had brought up all of their available artillery from their railroad, mostly consisting of 75 mm guns manned by White Russians. They also concentrated all available troops from Arkhangelsk and other sectors, including Companies E, I, and M of the 339th Infantry Regiment, three White Russian companies (three infantry, one machine gun), two Yorkshire platoons, and one invaluable section from the US 310th Engineers. The Allied force, totaling less than 2,000 soldiers, faced an estimated 7,000 Red Army troops drawn from the 2nd Moscow Regiment, the 9th Saratov Regiment, and a Kamyshin brigade, possibly from Commander Fyodor Kuznetsov's Kamyshinsk Division. A Soviet artillery battery of 4.2-inch guns had been hauled into position over 37 miles at the cost of uncounted dead horses.

== Battle ==
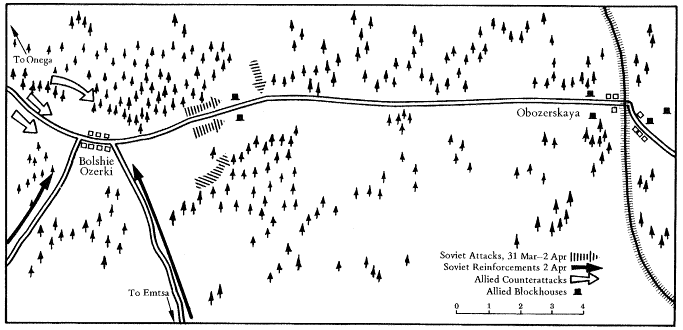
The Battle of Bolshie Ozerki (March 31 - April 2, 1919).

At about 8:30 AM on the morning of March 31, 1919, the elements of the Red Army cut the telephone lines between Obozerskaya and the Allied positions along the road. Three battalions of the 2nd Moscow Regiment then flanked the Allies from the north and attempted to capture two 75 mm guns. Lieutenant Kukovsky, the White Russian responsible for these guns, reversed them in time to fire four shrapnel rounds into the Reds at point-blank range. The effective fire from the Lewis gun team under Corporal Pratt, Company M, 339th Infantry, halted the Muscovites with heavy losses. Fighting then shifted to frontal positions as the Red Army launched repeated attacks from Bolshie Ozerki throughout the day. Combined with the added toll inflicted by Allied artillery, devastating fire from the forward blockhouse and front line positions drove back every Soviet attack until nightfall.

The main Red Army assault began at about 3:30 AM on April 1, shortly after daybreak, with determined frontal attacks and a weaker demonstration at the Allies' rear. Again, all Soviet attacks were driven back by machine gun, rifle, and artillery fire. At times, rifle grenades were employed when Soviet troops came within their 200-yard range. Several Soviet deserters revealed demoralization within Red units, reporting that an entire company of the 97th Saratov Regiment had refused to advance. Despite this, Allied launched a diversionary attack against on the village from the west in order to relieve the pressure on heavily engaged Allied units to the east.

The Allies had planned the diversionary attack for 3:00 AM on April 2, 1919. Lieutenant Marsh, leading C Company of the Yorkshires, accompanied by White Russian guides would move along a forest trail that had been recently reconnoitered by a White Russian officer. A Company, Yorkshires, under Captain Bailey would advance along another trail blazed about a week earlier, protected on its right flank by a detachment moving along the main road leading into the village from the northwest. Along with part of a White Russian machine gun company, an American trench mortar detachment and machine gun team from Company H, 339th Infantry would also assist Captain Bailey, providing two infantry platoons for a reserve. A Polish company would advance along the main road and deploy south of the road upon contact with the enemy.

The attack was, however, no more successful than the concurrent Red Army offensive. Lieutenant Marsh reported at 2:00 AM that his company was lost, his horses were belly-deep in the snow, and that he could not proceed, thus neutralizing a main element in the attack until it returned to the main road, far from its objective, at 5:10 AM. The Poles had suffered heavy casualties by this time, forcing them to withdraw temporarily. A Company was partially surrounded at 6:10 AM and forced to yield ground. Lieutenant Goodloss assumed command when Captain Bailey was killed and subsequently ordered a retreat. Lieutenant Clifford F. Phillips, leading a platoon from Company H, 339th Infantry, rushed up from the reserves to cover the British retreat. Lt. Phillips was also mortally wounded in this subsequent delaying action, repelling enemy counterattacks for an hour with a few men and 2 Lewis guns until reinforcements arrived.

The citation for his posthumous receipt of the Distinguished Service Cross for bravery reads as follows:

During the attack on Bolshie Ozerki from the west by Company H, Lt. Phillips, "through the superb control of his men, kept them all in line and his Lewis guns going with great effectiveness and gave ground slowly and grudgingly, in spite of casualties and great severity of cold." During the fighting, Lt. Phillips received a chest wound, which nicked an artery in his lung. According to his Company commander, who was watching him when he was hit, "it knocked him down as if a ton of brick had fallen on him. He said to me, 'My God, I got it. Captain, don't bother with me, I am done for, just look after the boys'." Lt. Phillips was eventually removed to the field hospital in Onega, where he died on 10 May 1919.

Artillery and mortar exchanges ensued throughout the remainder of the day until a successful Allied counterattack occurred at 5:30 PM in response to Soviet pressure on both flanks. The Bolsheviks disengaged at 7:00 PM and roughly an hour later, the Allies withdrew under cover of darkness to nearby quarters in settlements in the rear. Many soldiers suffered from exhaustion and severe frostbite. A heavy Soviet artillery and mortar barrage east of Bolshie Ozerki was met by an Allied counter-barrage on April 2. By noon, even weak infantry attacks had effectively ended. No more attacks followed, and by April 5 the Soviets withdrew from the area as further delay would have risked the loss or immobilization of guns and sleighs in spring mud. The Allies began evacuation from Arkhangelsk immediately after the thaw of ice.

== Aftermath ==
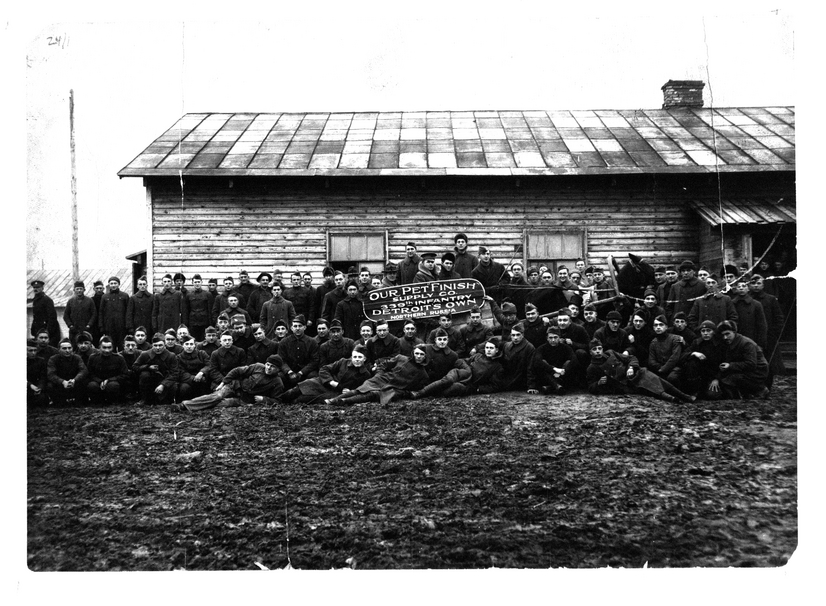
Men of the American 339th Infantry Regiment in northern Russia.

The fierce engagements at the turn of the month were the last major battles of the campaign in northern Russia. The Allies temporarily checked Soviet forces, defending their road positions, but did not succeed in budging them from their defenses at Bolshie Ozerki. Both sides suffered heavily from exposure despite sunny days and nighttime temperatures that did not fall below −20 °C (−4 °F). Sunshine melted snow which soaked through the canvas tops of Allied Shackleton boots, causing more cases of frostbite than even the coldest days of winter and conditions below −40 °C (−40 °F). A Soviet source acknowledged 500 frostbite casualties in the Kamyshin brigade alone, which was recklessly committed from the milder climate of the southern Volga region before receiving proper winter clothing, such as felt boots and sheepskin coats. The deployment of thousands of Soviet troops in the open for days on end condemned many to frostbite or death by freezing. In light of these facts, the Allied estimates of 2,000 Bolshevik casualties from all causes may have conservatively erred.

At least 10 members of the Yorkshire Regiment died during the April 1919 fighting.

In mid-April 17, Brigadier General Wilds P. Richardson arrived in Arkhangelsk after a personal briefing from President Woodrow Wilson to take charge of the evacuation of U.S. forces from North Russia. As the phased withdrawal from fighting fronts to bases in and around Arkhangelsk continued through the following months, operational control of the theater shifted to the White Army under the command of Governor-General Yevgeny-Ludvug Karlovich Miller.

== See also ==
- North Russia Intervention
- Polar Bear Expedition
- White movement
- Polish-Soviet War
- Siberian Intervention
- Banana Wars
