= Battle of Novo Litovoskaya =

Battle of the Russian Civil War

- Part of the Allied intervention in the Russian Civil War, Russian Civil War
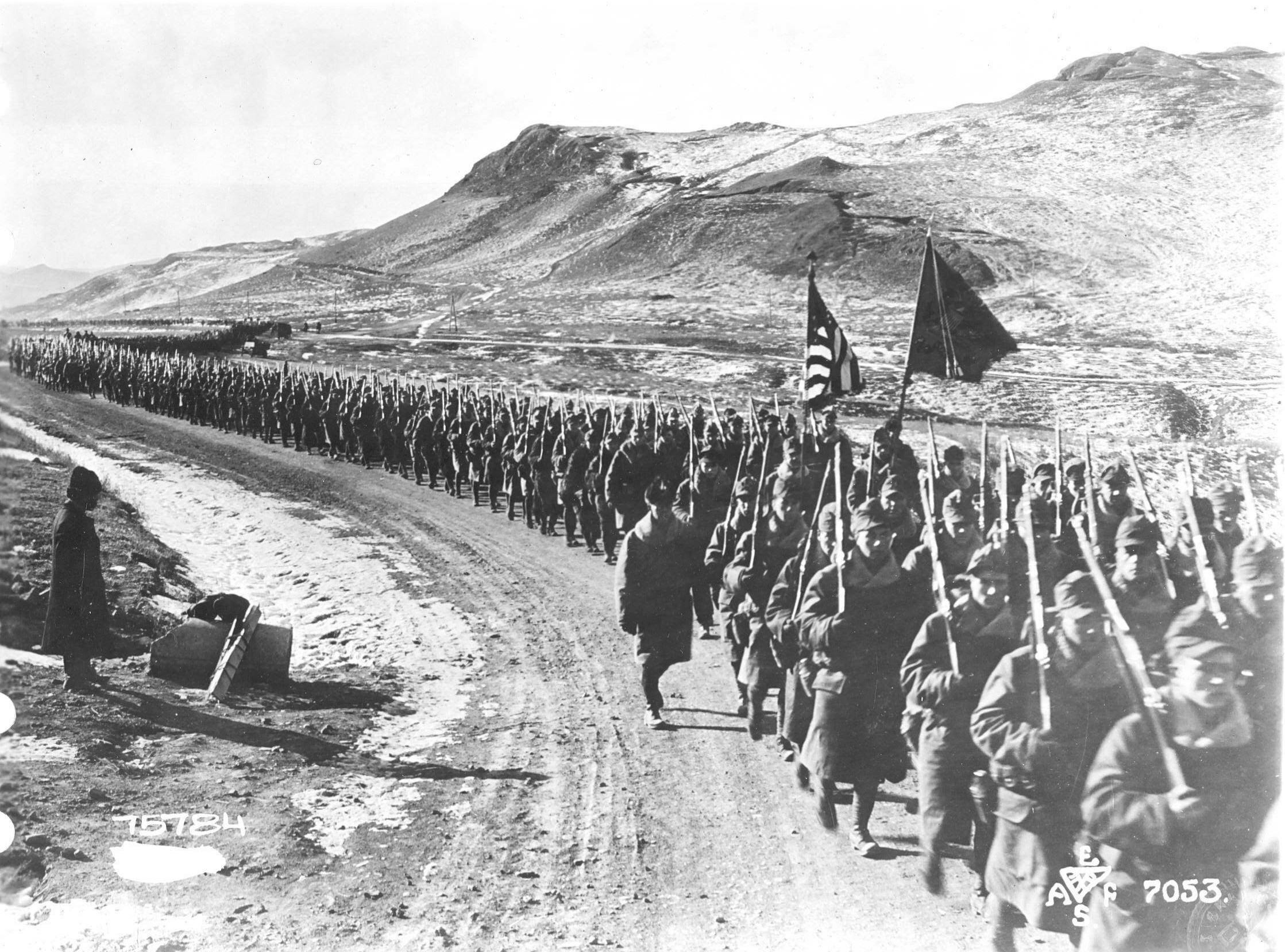
- U.S. troops of the 31st infantry regiment in the field
Date	August 7, 1919
Location	Novo Litovoskaya, Siberia, Russia
Result	American victory

Belligerents
United States	(Russian Soviet Federative Socialist Republic) Russian SFSR

Commanders and leaders
(United States) Owen Rhoads (United States) Charles Frankenfeld	Unknown

Strength
40-man patrol	30-man patrol

Casualties and losses
None	All killed or captured

The Battle of Novo Litovoskaya took place on 7 August 1919, and was the result of two small contingents of opposing troops making contact during their respective patrols of the town. After initial stubborn resistance, the entire Russian patrol was killed or captured while the American patrol of similar strength remained completely intact.

== Battle ==
After repelling a numerically-superior Russian surprise attack at Romanovka and clearing the Suchan Mines during the Suchan Valley Campaign, a 40-man patrol of Company H (31st Infantry) under the command of Captain Owen Rhoads decimated an enemy patrol of 30 Red Army troops. The Americans sustained no casualties, and Corporal Frankenfeld received recognition for bravery after overrunning a Russian-held hut single-handedly with an M1911 pistol as a consequence of getting caught out in the open during the firefight.
