= General Bradley (disambiguation) =

Omar Bradley (1893–1981) was a U.S. Army general who became General of the Army in World War II. General Bradley may also refer to:

- Alfred Eugene Bradley (1864–1922), U.S. Army brigadier general
- John Jewsbury Bradley (1869–1948), U.S. Army brigadier general
- Luther Prentice Bradley (1822–1910), Union brigadier general
- Mark Edward Bradley (1907–1999), U.S. Air Force general
