= Sergey Lazo =

Soviet Russian partisan (1894–1920)

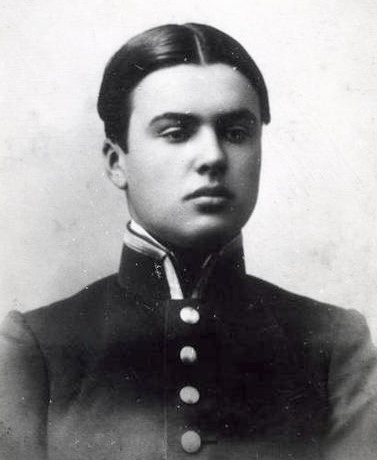
Sergey Lazo in 1912

Sergey (Serghei, Sergei) Georgiyevich Lazo (Russian: Серге́й Гео́ргиевич Лазо́, Romanian: Serghei Lazo; March 7, 1894 – April or May 1920) was a Russian nobleman, officer of the Imperial Russian Army, and Bolshevik leader in the October 1917 Revolution in the Russian Far East.

Lazo was born in the village of Piatra, Orhei, now in Orhei district, Moldova in a family of Moldovan boyars who were from the nobility. In 1917, he was a cadet at the Imperial Russian military academy when he joined the Bolshevik forces and was entrusted with several missions in Siberia during the Russian Civil War. In March–August 1918 he was a commander of the Zabaykalski (trans-Baikalan) Front, and fought against Ataman Grigory Semyonov. Later he fought in Bolshevik partisan units in the Vladivostok and Partizansk areas, commanding the Red Army during the Suchan Valley Campaign against American forces. On January 31, 1920, the Bolsheviks took power in Vladivostok, but on April 5, 1920, Lazo and other commanders were arrested by Japanese troops. Then, Lazo disappeared, along with Vsevolod Sibirtsev and Alexey Lutski. Reportedly they were shot shortly after, but the exact details of the execution have never been known yet. It is widely believed that the Japanese or Cossacks of the White movement burned them in the firebox of a steam engine in Muravyevo-Amurskaya (currently Lazo) station, while some sources claim he was shot and buried.

== Memory ==
After the Axis powers attacked the USSR in summer 1941, a Soviet partisan regiment named after Sergey Lazo (партизанский полк имени С. Лазо) was formed; it operated in the forests of the Smolensk region. In October 1942, this regiment became the basis of the 5th Partisan Brigade "Sergei Lazo" (5-я Ворговская партизанская бригада имени С. Лазо)

A number of locations in the Russian Far East now bear Lazo's name, the most prominent being Lazovsky District in Primorsky Krai and imeni Lazo District in Khabarovsk Krai.

Between 1944 and 1991 the Moldovan city of Sîngerei was named Lazovsk, after Lazo.

One of the streets in the center of Chişinău, the capital of the Republic of Moldova, is named after him.

== Literature ==
- Л. Козлова. Жизнь - подвиг // журнал «Начальная школа», № 3, 1984.
