= Military Board of Allied Supply =

Allied agency

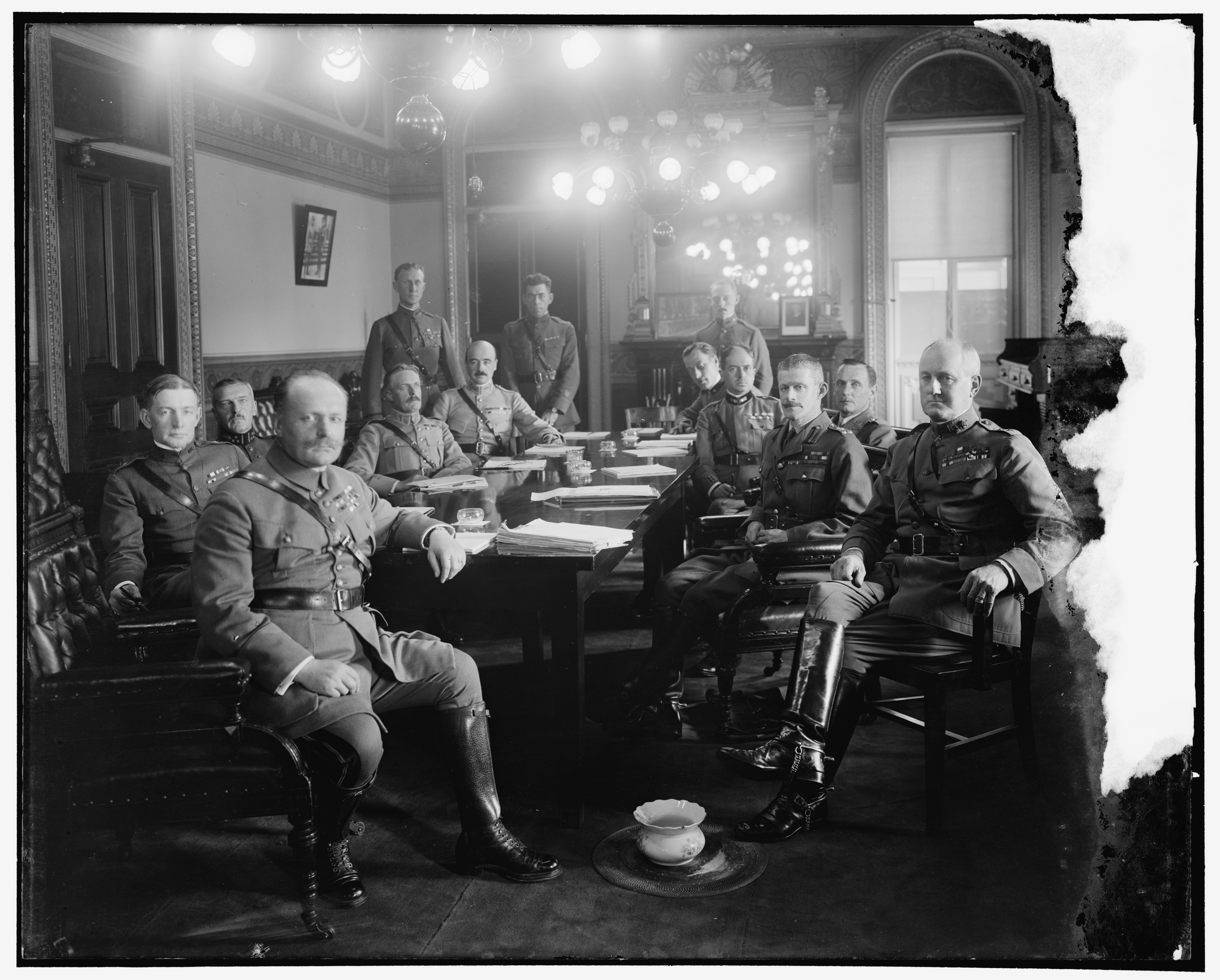
General Charles G. Dawes with the MBAS

The Military Board of Allied Supply (MBAS) was an Allied agency created in 1918 for the coordination of logistical support of the Allied forces on the Western front in World War I. In March 1918 Colonel Charles G. Dawes, the general purchasing agent for the American Expeditionary Forces (AEF) recommended to commanding general John Pershing, that a new intergovernmental agency was necessary to coordinate transportation and storage of military supplies in France. Pershing before his appointment had been in charge of purchasing in the United States, and was keenly aware of the need for logistical coordination. Pershing took the recommendation to French Premier Georges Clemenceau. The British were hesitant at first but finally the key players were in agreement and the Board was established in May 1918. It involved coordinating the entirely different supply systems for the American, British, and French armies, as well as the Italian and Belgian armies. It started operation from its base in Paris at the end of June. The president of the board was French general Jean-Marie Charles Payot (1868-1931). Dawes represented the United States on the board, which was assisted by an international staff. MBAS reported to commander-in-chief Marshall Ferdinand Foch. Board decisions had to be unanimous, and once made were binding on all of the armies. However each army continued to be responsible for its own logistical system and procedures.

The first priority of MBAS was to invent a system for pooling resources, establishing common policies, and coordinating the gigantic supply bases in the rear of the front lines. All the warehouses were mapped and monitored. MBAS took control of 11,000 trucks, and allocated fuel and repair parts, as well as setting up standards for maintenance and repair. Its set out procedures for the use of railways, fuel, and the construction and operation of military telephone and telegraph systems. It operated schools to instruct officers regarding motor transport, rules of the road for truck convoys, and railway procedures. Among many specialized tasks, procedures were established for the optimum use of French timber resources, and the pooling of artillery ammunition. MBAS established a standard forage for horses, but was unable to develop a common ration for the various armies. The main achievement was to reduce inter-Allied competition for scarce resources, and making more efficient use of the heavily used rail system. The final formal meeting came in December 1918, but the staff worked until 1921 in compiling statistical data and historic studies of the operations. The experience was largely forgotten in the postwar years, and the vital lessons were reinvented in the Second World War.
