= Vystavka =

Vystavka (Russian: Выставка) is the name of several rural localities in Russia.

== Arkhangelsk Oblast ==
As of 2010, three rural localities in Arkhangelsk Oblast bear this name:

- Vystavka, Pacheozersky Selsoviet, Kotlassky District, Arkhangelsk Oblast, a village in Pacheozersky Selsoviet of Kotlassky District
- Vystavka, Votlazhemsky Selsoviet, Kotlassky District, Arkhangelsk Oblast, a village in Votlazhemsky Selsoviet of Kotlassky District
- Vystavka, Privodino, Kotlassky District, Arkhangelsk Oblast, a village under the administrative jurisdiction of Privodino Urban-Type Settlement with Jurisdictional Territory in Kotlassky District
- Vystavka, Cheremushskoye Rural Settlement, Kotlassky District, Arkhangelsk Oblast, a village in Cheremushskoye Rural Settlement of Kotlassky District

== Ivanovo Oblast ==
As of 2010, two rural localities in Ivanovo Oblast bear this name:

- Vystavka (Ramenskoye Rural Settlement), Palekhsky District, Ivanovo Oblast, a village in Palekhsky District; municipally, a part of Ramenskoye Rural Settlement of that district
- Vystavka (Panovskoye Rural Settlement), Palekhsky District, Ivanovo Oblast, a village in Palekhsky District; municipally, a part of Panovskoye Rural Settlement of that district

== Kostroma Oblast ==
As of 2010, one rural locality in Kostroma Oblast bears this name:

- Vystavka, Kostroma Oblast, a village in Belkovskoye Settlement of Vokhomsky District

== Novgorod Oblast ==
As of 2010, five rural localities in Novgorod Oblast bear this name:

- Vystavka, Sushilovskoye Settlement, Borovichsky District, Novgorod Oblast, a village in Sushilovskoye Settlement of Borovichsky District
- Vystavka, Zhelezkovskoye Settlement, Borovichsky District, Novgorod Oblast, a village in Zhelezkovskoye Settlement of Borovichsky District
- Vystavka, Kholmsky District, Novgorod Oblast, a village in Togodskoye Settlement of Kholmsky District
- Vystavka, Malovishersky District, Novgorod Oblast, a village in Burginskoye Settlement of Malovishersky District
- Vystavka, Moshenskoy District, Novgorod Oblast, a village in Dolgovskoye Settlement of Moshenskoy District

== Pskov Oblast ==
As of 2010, five rural localities in Pskov Oblast bear this name:

- Vystavka, Ostrovsky District, Pskov Oblast, a village in Ostrovsky District
- Vystavka, Palkinsky District, Pskov Oblast, a village in Palkinsky District
- Vystavka, Pechorsky District, Pskov Oblast, a village in Pechorsky District
- Vystavka, Porkhovsky District, Pskov Oblast, a village in Porkhovsky District
- Vystavka, Pskovsky District, Pskov Oblast, a village in Pskovsky District

== Smolensk Oblast ==
As of 2010, one rural locality in Smolensk Oblast bears this name:

- Vystavka, Smolensk Oblast, a village in Vorobyevskoye Rural Settlement of Demidovsky District

== Tver Oblast ==
As of 2010, two rural localities in Tver Oblast bear this name:

- Vystavka, Likhoslavlsky District, Tver Oblast, a village in Stanskoye Rural Settlement of Likhoslavlsky District
- Vystavka, Selizharovsky District, Tver Oblast, a village in Berezugskoye Rural Settlement of Selizharovsky District

== Vologda Oblast ==
As of 2010, one rural locality in Vologda Oblast bears this name:

- Vystavka, Vologda Oblast, a village in Verkhneshardengsky Selsoviet of Velikoustyugsky District
