= 339th Infantry Regiment =

339th Regiment 339th Infantry Regiment
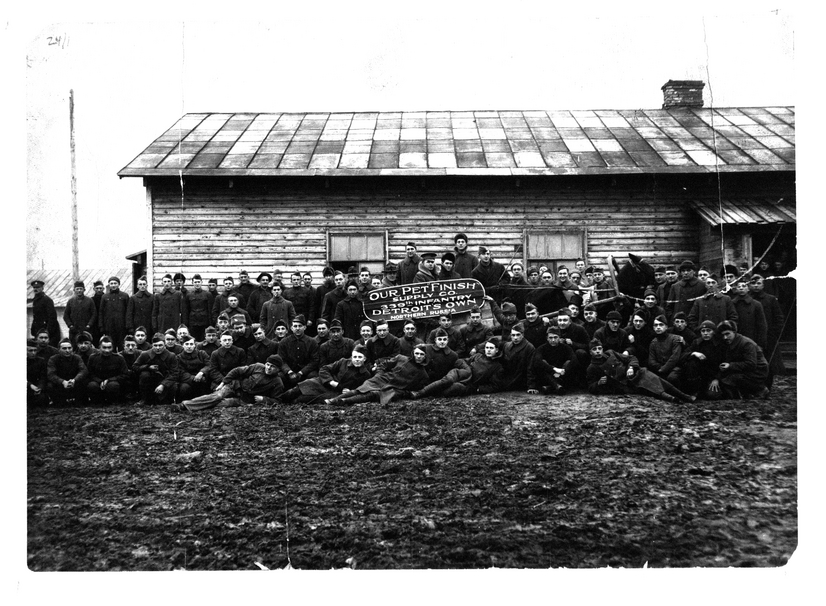
- Men of the 339th Infantry during the Polar Bear Expedition.
- Active: 1918-1919; 1921-1945; 1947-
- Branch: United States Army
- Type: Infantry
- Size: Regiment
- Nicknames: Detroit's Own; Polar Bears
- Motto: "We Finish With The Bayonet"
- Engagements: Russian Civil War (Polar Bear Expedition): Battle of Shenkursk; Battle of Tulgas; World War II

Insignia
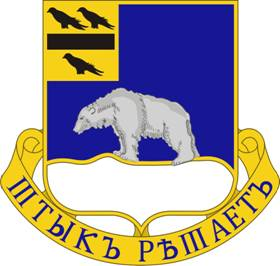
- Distinctive unit insignia

The 339th Infantry Regiment is an infantry regiment of the United States Army, raised for service in World War I, that served in the North Russia Intervention and World War II.

== North Russia intervention ==
The 339th Regiment was created in June 1918, composed mainly of young draftees, for the purpose of fighting on the Western Front in France. Most of the 4,487 men were from Michigan, but some 500 draftees from Wisconsin were included. It was commonly referred to as "Detroit's Own". They were sent to fight the Bolsheviks in Northern Russia. They were nicknamed the "polar bears" because of their service there.

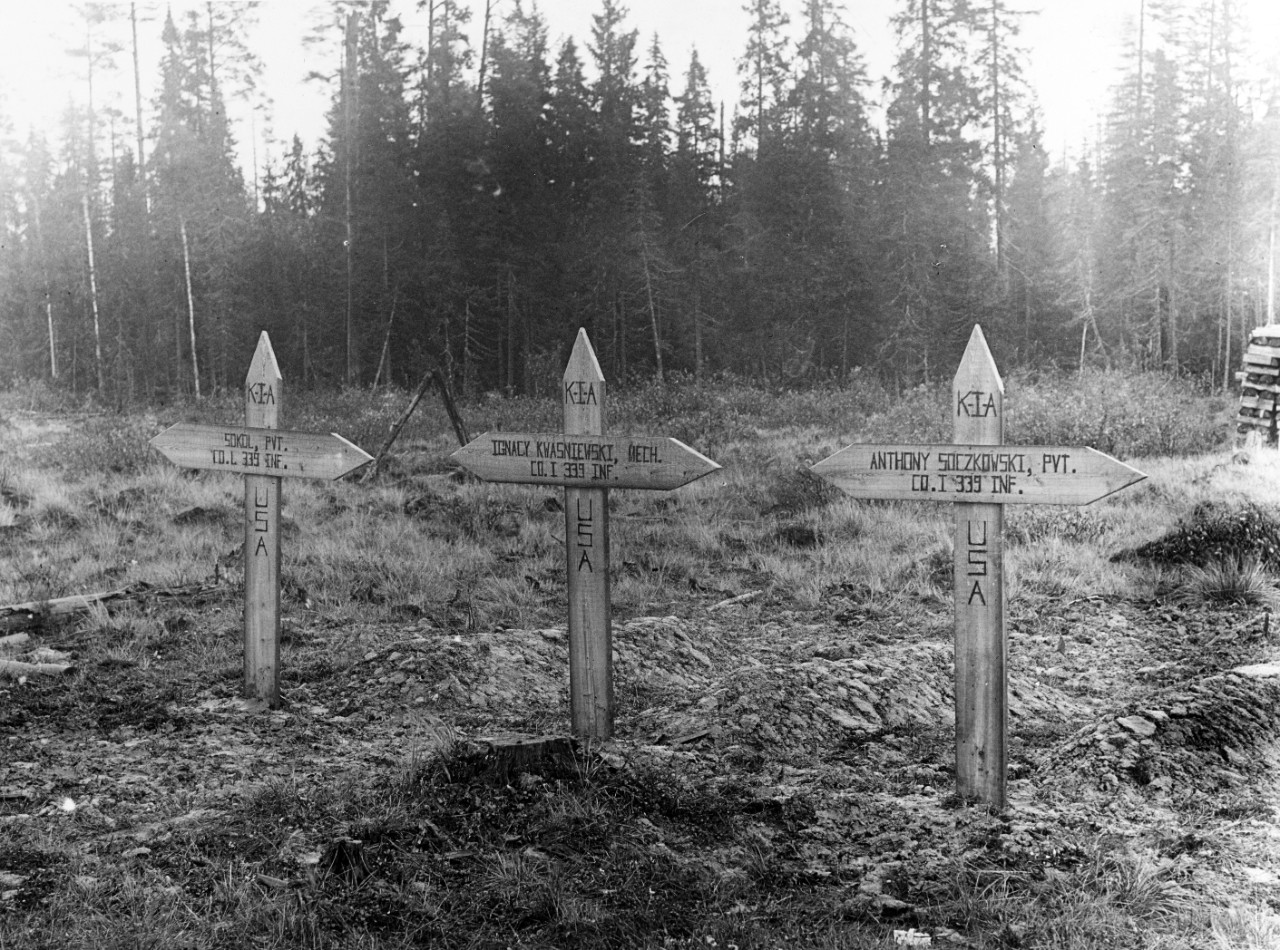
Graves of first US Soldiers killed Obozerskaya, Russia, on 16 September 1918. The men were: Private Sokol (Philip Sokol), Mech. Ignacy Kwasniewski, Private Anthony Soczkowski Company I 339th Infantry Regiment.

On 30 July 1918, General John J. Pershing, Commander-in-Chief of the American Expeditionary Force (AEF) on the Western Front, by order of President Woodrow Wilson, chose the 339th Infantry Regiment, the 1st Battalion of the 310th Engineers, the 337th Field Hospital, and the 337th Ambulance Company, (all from the 85th Division) to form the Murmansk Expedition. These units were assembled and equipped at Cowshott Camp, Surrey, England. 9 August 1918, with Lt Col George Evans Stewart (later Col) of the 339th Inf as commanding officer of the expedition. 27 Aug 1918, the expedition, 143 officers and 4,344 enlisted men, sailed from Newcastle upon Tyne, England, and arrived Archangel, North Russia, on 4 September, where, with other Allied forces, it became part of the command of Maj Gen F. C. Poole, British Army. American Headquarters was established at Archangel. Distribution of American troops began along a front 450 miles long, extending from Onega in the west to Pinega in the east, and at some points 200 miles distant from the Archangel base. Elements of the 339th Infantry and attached units operated with the Allied forces to cover the main avenues of approach to Archangel from the south as follows: on the Onega River near Chekuevo; on the railway from Archangel to Vologda near Obozerskaya; on the Vaga River at Pinega. These forces were opposed by the Soviet Sixth Army. 30 September 1918, reinforcements, consisting of 17 officers and 486 enlisted men from the 85th Division, joined. Between September 1918 and May 1919 many minor operations took place against the Soviet forces resulting in more than 500 American casualties. 26 October 1918, Major General Edmund Ironside, British Army, succeeded Major General Poole as commander of the Allied force. 9 April 1919, the American contingent was again redesignated, becoming the "American Expeditionary Force, North Russia"; Brig Gen Wilds P. Richardson assumed command of all American troops in North Russia, supreme command however continuing with the British. During May the Archangel contingent was concentrated in the region of that town preparatory to return to the United States. 3 June 1919, the contingent began moving via Brest to the United States. 27 June 1919, the last element, the 1st Battalion of the 310th Engineers, sailed for Brest, en route to United States.

In April 1919, the enlisted men of Company I mutinied, challenging their officers and refusing orders. Chief of Staff Gen. March attributed the action to "Bolshevik Propaganda" at a press conference on 12 April. Company I consisted almost entirely of men from Detroit.

Only after leaving England, were the men told of their destination. Spanish Influenza broke out on two of the three transports, and seventy-two men eventually succumbed to the disease or resultant pneumonia.

== Interwar period ==
The 339th Infantry arrived at the port of Boston on 12 July 1919 on the USS President Grant and was demobilized 18–22 July 1919 at Camp Custer, Michigan. It was reconstituted in the Organized Reserve on 24 June 1921, assigned to the 85th Division, and allotted to the Sixth Corps Area. The regiment was initiated on 14 October 1921 with the entire regiment at Detroit; the regimental band was organized about August 1924 at Detroit. The regiment conducted summer training most years with the 2nd Infantry Regiment at Camp Custer or Fort Wayne, Michigan, and also conducted infantry Citizens Military Training Camps some years at Camp Custer or Fort Brady, Michigan, as an alternate form of summer training. The primary ROTC feeder school for new Reserve lieutenants for the regiment was the University of Michigan at Ann Arbor.

== World War II ==
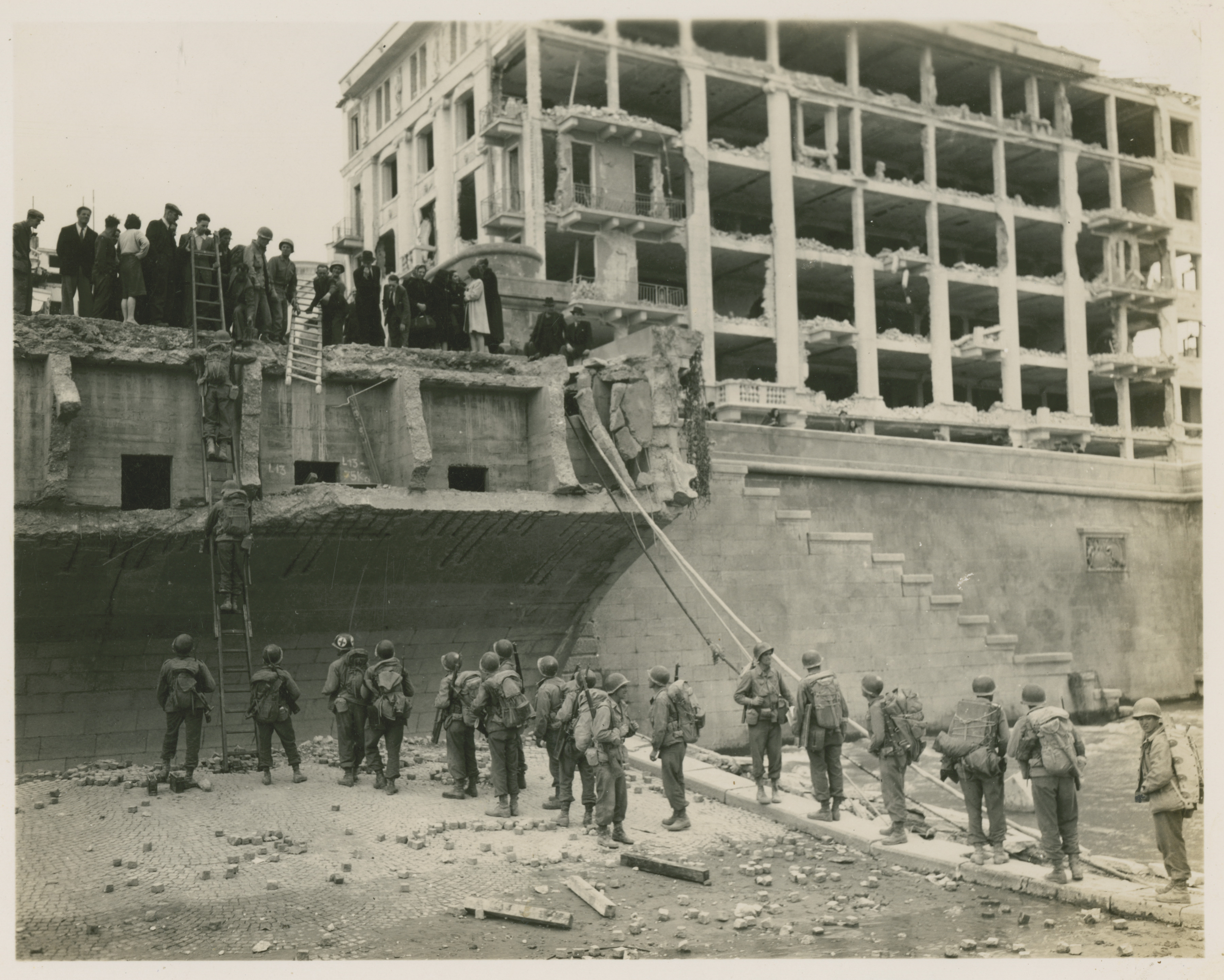
G.I.'s of the 1st Battalion, 339th Infantry Regiment of the 85th Division crossing the river Adige in Verona over the destroyed Ponte Della Vittoria, April 1945.

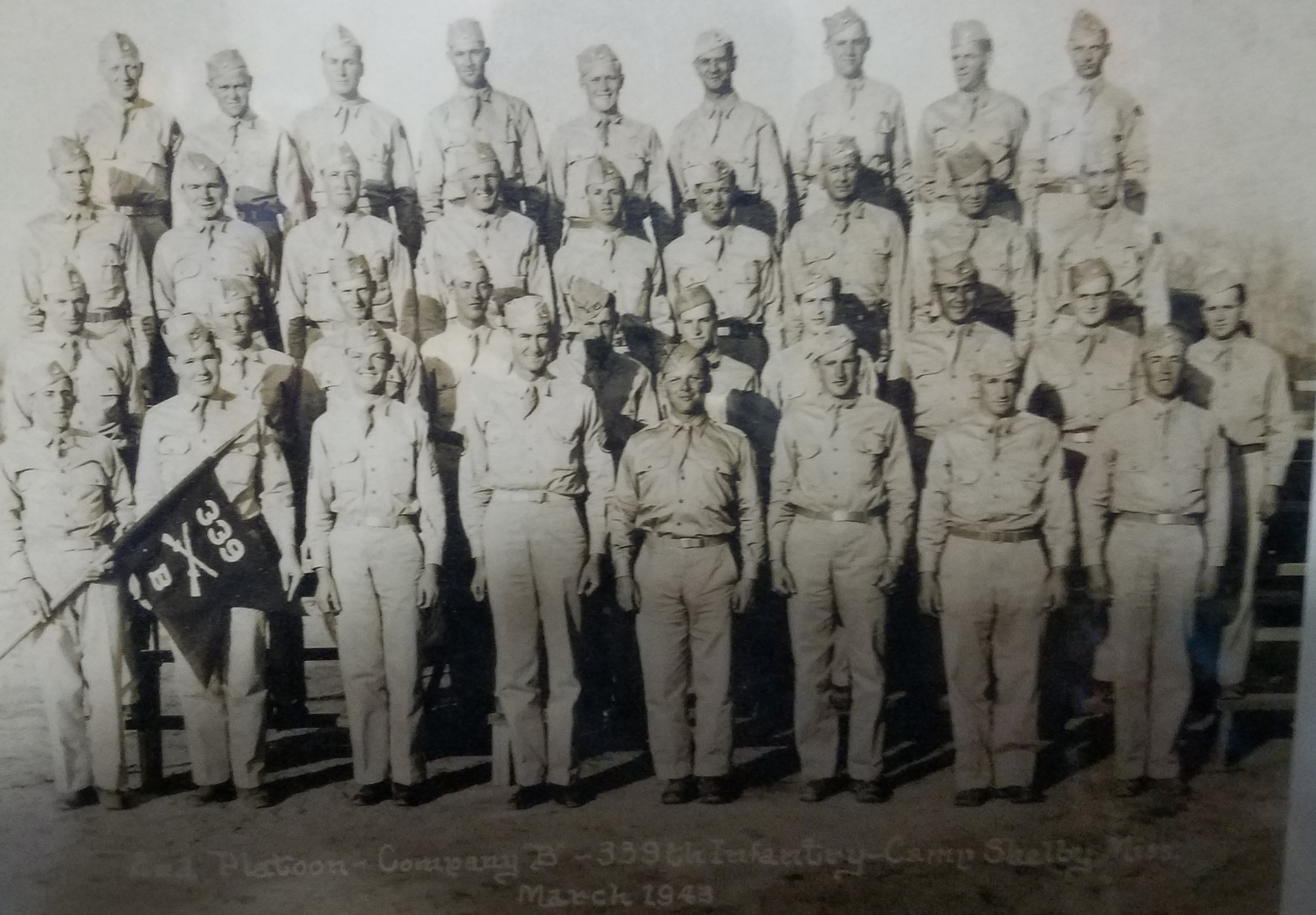
Men of the 2nd Platoon-Company B 339th Infantry Regiment at Camp Shelby, Mississippi in March 1943.

The 339th Infantry Regiment was reactivated in 1942 and assigned to Camp Shelby, Mississippi. During World War II, the area of operations was the European theater, fighting in the Allied campaign in Italy from 1944 to 1945. The regiment was assigned to the 85th Infantry Division. As a unit of the 85th Infantry or "Custer" Division, the 339th Infantry saw combat service in Italy from March 1944 until the surrender of German forces in May 1945.

On the morning of May 4, 1945, G Company of the 339th was sent to Pragser Wildsee to liberate 139 high-profile prisoners transferred there during the closing days of the war. They were successful and the Wehrmacht soldiers escorting the prisoners surrendered to the Americans.

== Distinctive Unit Insignia ==
- Description/Blazon

A gold color metal and enamel device 1 5/32 inches (2.9 cm) in height consisting of a shield blazoned: Azure a polar bear statant on an ice cake Argent: on a canton Or a fess Sable between three martlets of the like two and one. Attached below and to the sides a Gold scroll inscribed "Штыкъ рѣшаетъ" in Blue letters.

- Symbolism

The polar bear on its blue background is copied from the unofficial shoulder patch of the North Russian Expeditionary Force, of which this regiment was a part during the years 1918–1919. The regiment, organized in 1917, was made up to a large extent of men from Detroit, and was known locally as "Detroit's Own". The canton bears a part of the coat of arms of Cadillac, the founder of Detroit, and is symbolic of the origin of the regiment and of its 1924 allocation. The motto is pronounced as though spelled in English "shtyk reshayet" (Russian pronunciation: [ˈʂtɨk rʲɪˈʂajɪt]). Literally translated it is "The bayonet settles it", freely translated it may be rendered "We Finish With The Bayonet".

- Background

The distinctive unit insignia was originally approved for the 339th Infantry Regiment on 9 June 1924. It was redesignated for the 339th Regiment and amended to include the motto on 5 August 1960.

== See also ==
- Battle of Bolshie Ozerki
