= Battle of Ust-Padenga =

Battle during the Russian Civil War

- Part of North Russia intervention in the Russian Civil War
- Location of Arkhangelsk Governorate in Russia
Date	January 19, 1919
Location	Ust-Padenga, Arkhangelsk Governorate, Russia
Result	Soviet victory: American retreat from Ust-Padenga
Territorial changes	The Bolsheviks occupied Ust Padenga

Belligerents
United States	Russian SFSR

Commanders and leaders
(United States) Lieutenant Harry Mead	Unknown

Units involved
(United States) American Expeditionary Force, North Russia or the 339th Infantry Regiment "Polar Bears"	Unknown

Strength
47 soldiers	~800 Bolshevik infantrymen

Casualties and losses
25 killed, 15 injured	Unknown

The Battle of Ust-Padenga, also known as the Defense of Ust-Padenga, was a minor battle during the Russian Civil War, fought in Ust-Padenga, located in Arkhangelsk Governorate, 500 miles away from Moscow. It was a part of a larger retreat which occurred in January 1919 during the larger-scale Battle of Shenkursk.

== Background ==
=== Nizhnyaya Gora, Battle of Shenkursk ===
During the Battle of Ust-Padenga, a larger-scale battle had also been occurring at the same time. This was the Battle of Shenkursk, which began on January 19, 1919, and ended on January 25th, 1919 and was a major battle of the Russian Civil War. Following the Bolshevik loss at the Battle of Tulgas, the Red Army's next offensive action was against the Allied garrison of Shenkursk; located on the Vaga River. Allied forces in Shenkursk and the surrounding villages included men primarily from the United States and the United Kingdom with support from the White Russians. The battle ended with an Allied retreat from Shenkursk ahead of a superior Bolshevik army.

== The battle ==
=== Bolshevik bombardment ===
Just before dawn on January 19, Red Army soldiers moved through the tiny houses in the village of Ust-Padenga, hoping to push the Americans 200 miles away from their position, all the way to the White Sea. Bolshevik soldiers began firing artillery shells at the American positions, awaking Lieutenant Harry Mead from his sleep. The artillery shells fell for an hour until Bolshevik soldiers dressed in all-white uniforms rose up and began advancing on the American position, firing automatic rifles and muskets at the outnumbered Americans. Lieutenant Mead is quoted as saying:

"I at once realized that our position was hopeless. We were sweeping the enemy line with machine gun and rifle fire. As soon as one wave of the enemy was halted on one flank another was pressing in on us from the other side."

=== Attack and retreat ===
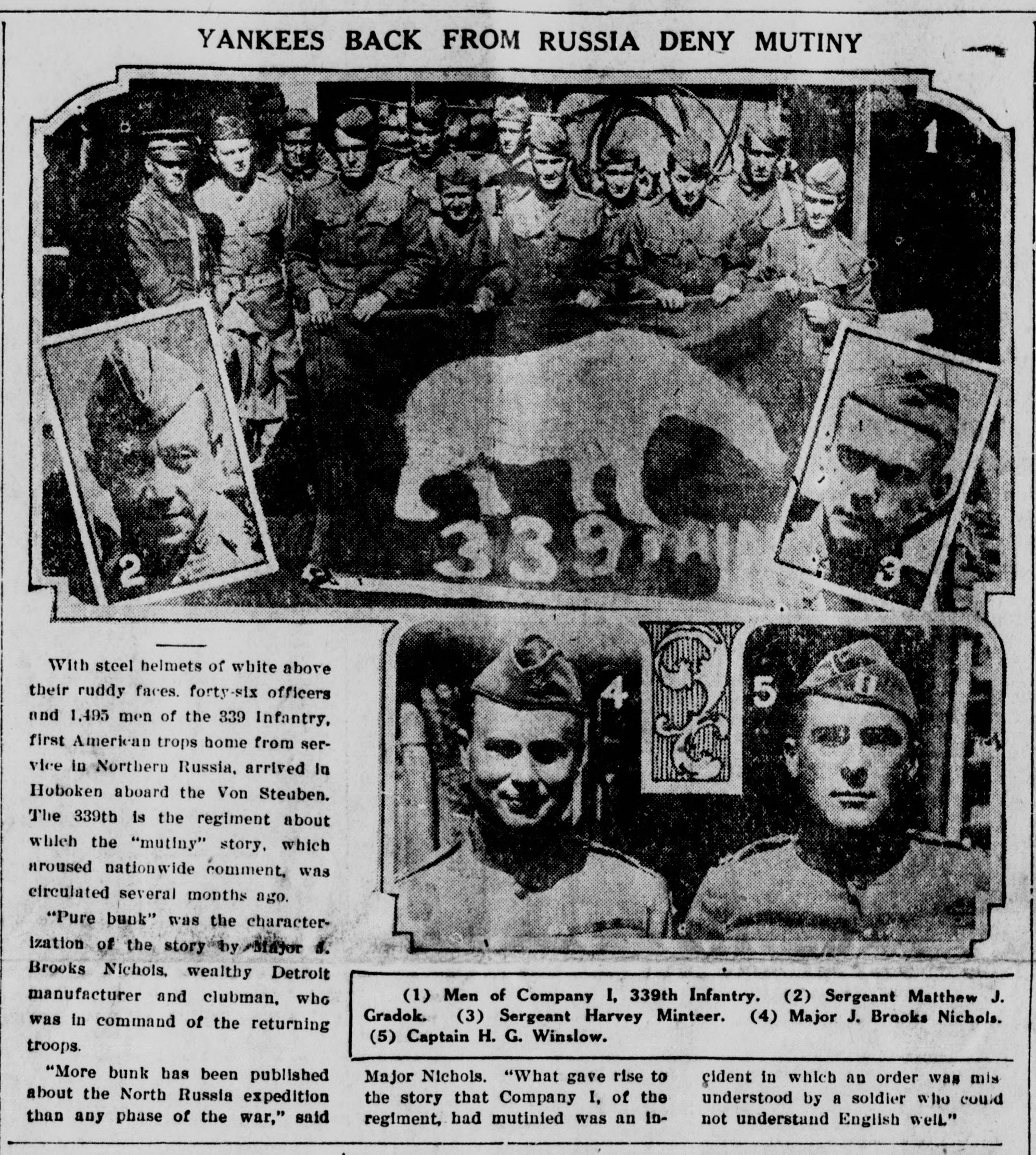
Men of the American Expeditionary Force return home from service in Northern Russia, arrived in Hoboken aboard the SS Von Steuben. (2) Sergeant Matthew J. Gradok. (3) Sergeant Harvey Minteer. (4) Major J. Brooks Nichols (5) Captain H. G. Winslow.

When the shelling stopped, around 800 Bolshevik infantrymen, supported by heavy machine guns advanced on the American positions wielding bayonets, automatic rifles and muskets. American troops began firing at the Bolsheviks, but they were severely outgunned and outnumbered by the Red Army. They were in danger of encirclement, and were ordered to fall back to Vysokaya Gora. The American troops conducted a fighting withdrawal, pulling back their forces while maintaining contact with the enemy. The allied position around Shenkursk, including Ust-Padenga was being attacked from three sides, meaning the outnumbered American force had less of an advantage against the more prepared, larger Russian force. As the Red Army neared, with bayonets fixed on their guns, Mead and his soldiers retreated. They ran through the village, from house to house. At last, Mead made it to the next village, filled with American soldiers.

== Aftermath ==
Of Mead's 47-man platoon, 25 died that day, and another 15 were injured. The evacuation of Ust Padenga was necessary and the Allied troops to the west and east of Shenkursk fell back. It was a crushing defeat for the Americans, and a pivotal point in the North Russia intervention. The Bolshevik victory at Ust Padenga and the subsequent American retreat from Shenkursk was a significant defeat for the Allied forces.

== See also ==
- Battle of Shenkursk
- Battle of Tulgas
