= Battle of Posolskeya =

Battle during the Russian Civil War

- Part of the Allied intervention in the Russian Civil War, Russian Civil War
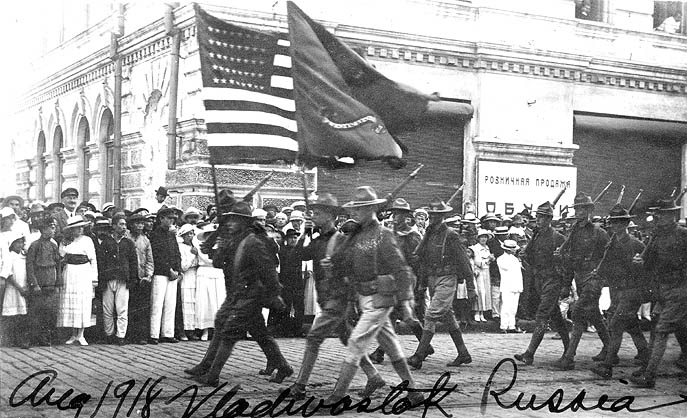
- U.S. troops of the 27th infantry regiment parading through Russia during the intervention.
| Date | January 10, 1920 |
| Location | Posolskeya, Siberia, Russia |
| Result | American victory |

Belligerents
| United States | Cossacks |

Commanders and leaders
| (United States) Fred Bugbee | Unknown |

Strength
| 39-man platoon | Around 80; 1 armoured train |

Casualties and losses
| 2 killed 2 wounded | 5 killed 74 captured 1 armored train seized |

The Battle of Posolskeya, the last engagement of the Allied intervention to involve American forces, occurred on 10 January 1920, after U.S. troops were surprise attacked by Cossacks loyal to the Russian SFSR.

== Battle ==
On January 9, 1920, the announcement was made that the American Expeditionary Force Siberia would be withdrawn from Russia. The following day, around 80 Cossacks and an armored train attacked a much smaller platoon of M Company, 27th Infantry, which managed to capture most of the attacking force while leaving the rest dead. Subsequently, the withdrawal of the expeditionary force continued as planned with no further obstructions.
