= Vaga River front =

A front during the Russian Civil War

The Vaga River front (Vaga front) was a front of the engagement of the Red Army and the Allied forces during the Allied intervention in the Russian Civil War.

Established along the Vaga River, a tributary of Northern Dvina, it was the southernmost line of advance of the Allied in the North Russia Campaign. Initially its purpose was to outflank the retreating Red Army, but when the tide turned it was vital to secure the Allied right flank on the Northern Dvina front.
