= George E. Stewart =

Medal of Honor recipient (1872–1946)

George Evans Stewart
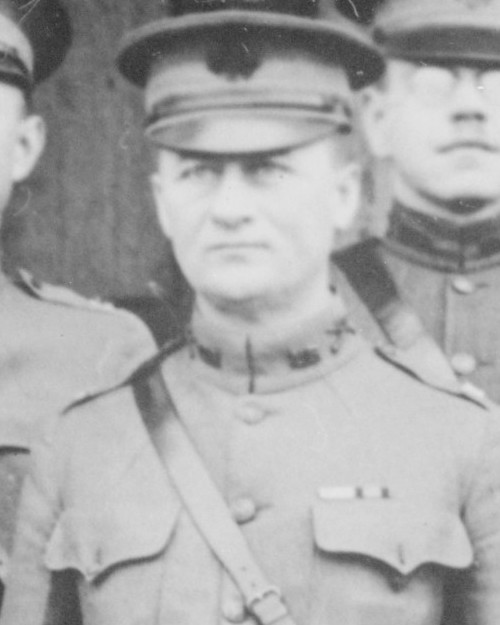
- Stewart at his headquarters in Arkhangelsk circa 1919
- Born: August 2, 1872; New South Wales, Australia
- Died: March 2, 1946 (aged 73); Portland, Texas, US
- Burial place: Arlington National Cemetery
- Military career
- Allegiance: United States
- Branch: US Army
- Service years: 1896–1931
- Rank: Colonel
- Unit: 19th Infantry Regiment
- Commands: 339th Infantry Regiment; American Expeditionary Force, North Russia
- Conflicts: Philippine–American War; World War I Russian Civil War: North Russia Intervention
- Awards: Medal of Honor

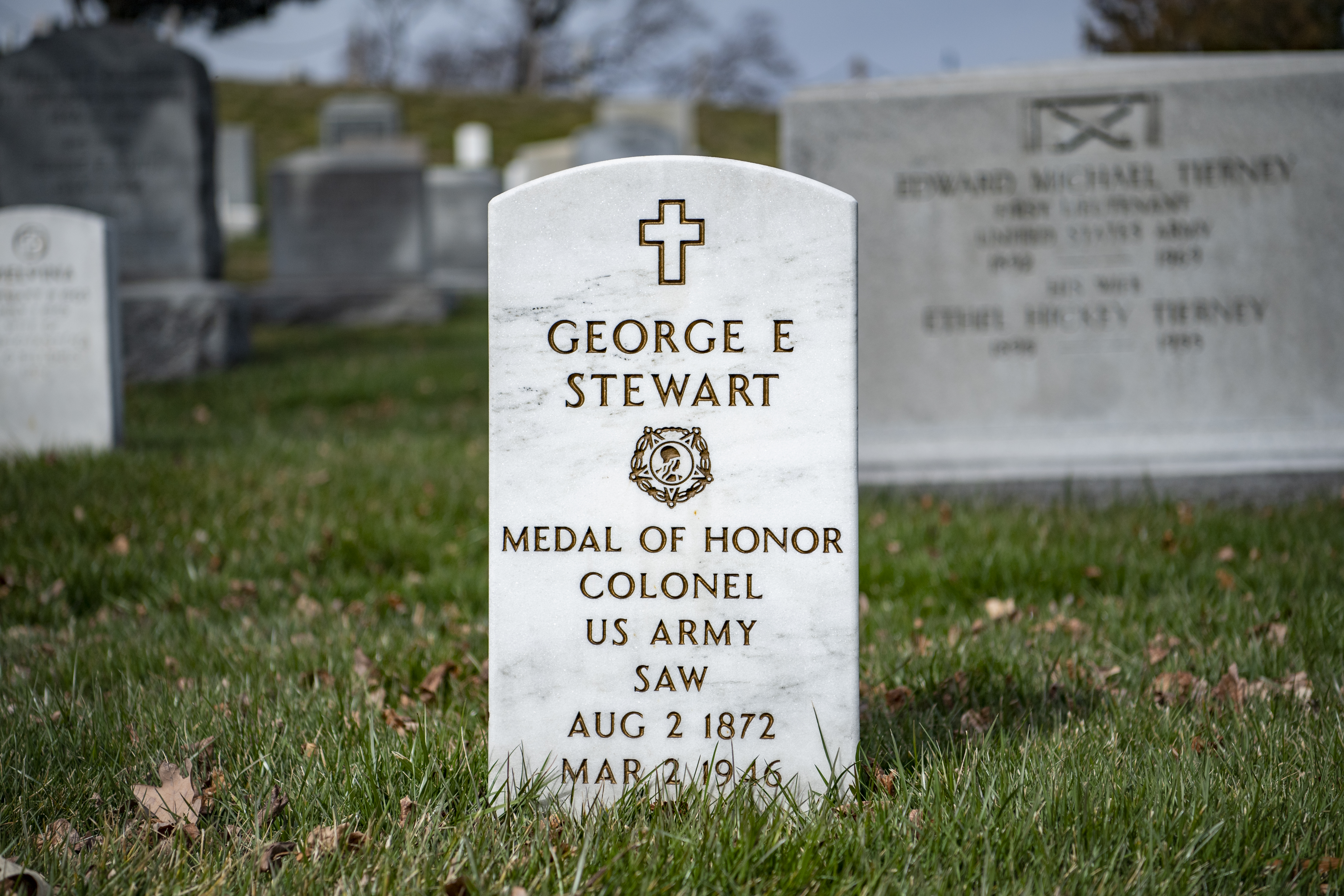
Grave at Arlington National Cemetery

George Evans Stewart (August 2, 1872 – March 2, 1946) was an officer in the United States Army and a Medal of Honor recipient for his actions in the Philippine–American War. He later commanded the 339th Infantry Regiment and the American Expeditionary Force in northern Russia.

Stewart joined the army from New York City in October 1896, and retired with the rank of colonel in April 1931.

== Medal of Honor citation ==
Rank and organization: Second Lieutenant, 19th U.S. Infantry. Place and date: At Passi, Island of Panay, Philippine Islands, November 26, 1899. Entered service at: New York, N.Y. Birth: New South Wales. Date of issue: June 26, 1900.

Citation:

While crossing a river in face of the enemy, this officer plunged in and at the imminent risk of his own life saved from drowning an enlisted man of his regiment.

== See also ==
- List of Medal of Honor recipients
- List of Philippine–American War Medal of Honor recipients
