= Vystavka, Votlazhemsky Selsoviet, Kotlassky District, Arkhangelsk Oblast =

Rural locality in Arkhangelsk Oblast, Russia

Vystavka Выставка
- Village
- Location within Arkhangelsk Oblast Location within Russia
- Coordinates: 61°05′34″N 46°36′52″E
- Country: Russia
- Region: Arkhangelsk Oblast
- District: Kotlassky District
- Time zone: UTC+3:00

Vystavka (Russian: Выставка) is a rural locality (a village) in Votlazhemsky Selsoviet of Kotlassky District of Arkhangelsk Oblast, Russia. The population was 171 in 2010.

It is the largest rural locality in the selsoviet, with a population of 202 as of January 2005. Within the framework of municipal divisions, it has since 2006 been a part of Cheryomushskoye Rural Settlement.

Votlazhma Trinity Church is located in Vystavka. The baroque church was built in 1753 and was closed for service in 1932. It is now deserted and neglected. The church is designated as a cultural heritage monument of local significance.
