= Shchukozerye =

Shchukozerye Щукозерье
- Selo
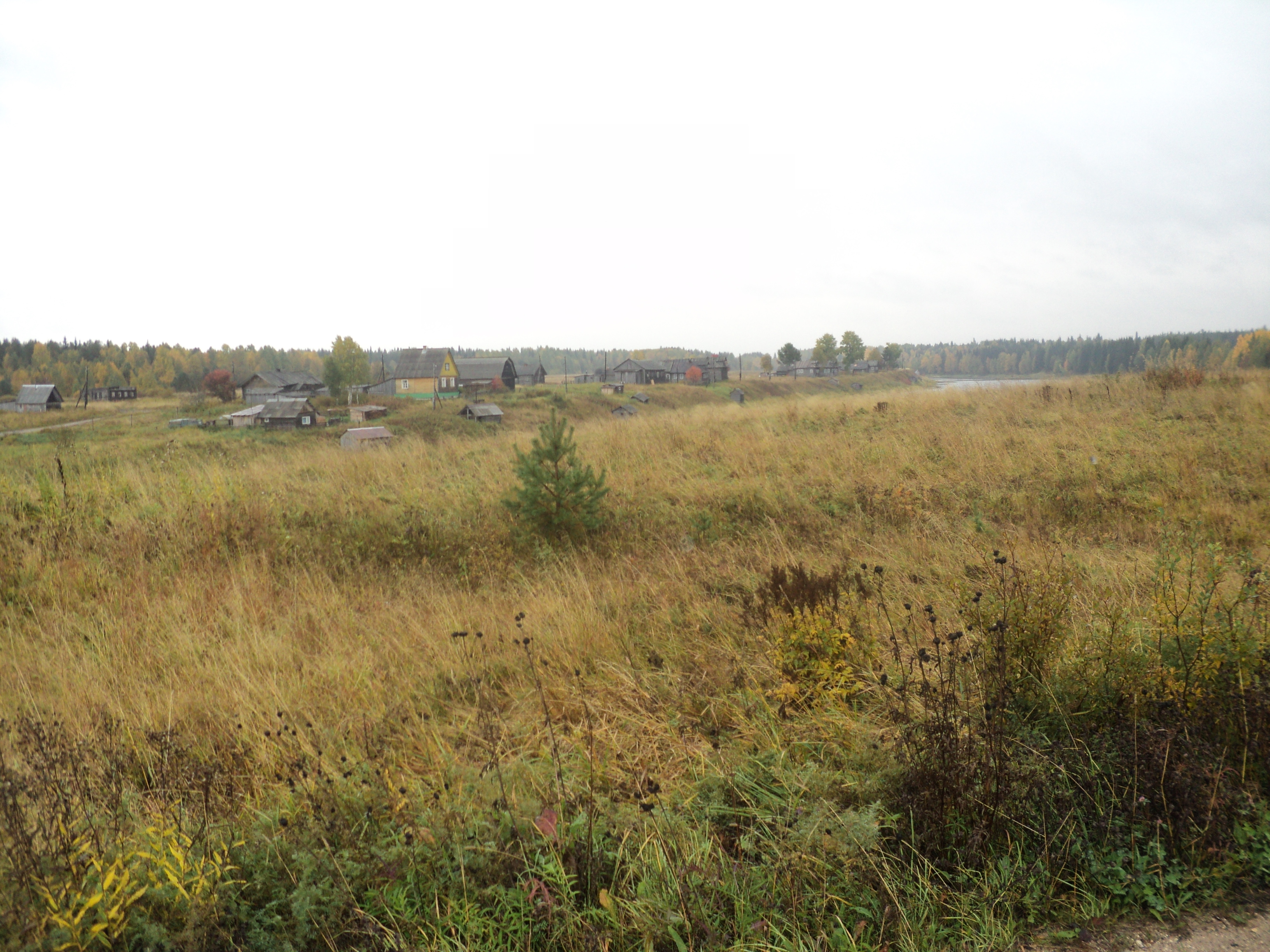
- Shchukozerye

- Location within Arkhangelsk Oblast Location within Russia
- Coordinates: 63°25′N 39°52′E
- Country: Russia
- Region: Arkhangelsk Oblast
- District: Plesetsky District
- Time zone: UTC+3:00

Shchukozerye (Russian: Щукозерье) is a rural locality (a selo) in Obozerskoye Urban Settlement of Plesetsky District, Arkhangelsk Oblast, Russia. The population was 4 as of 2010.

== Geography ==
Shchukozerye is located 127 km north of Plesetsk (the district's administrative centre) by road. Malye Ozerki is the nearest rural locality.
