= Alfred Eugene Bradley =

United States Army general (1864–1922)

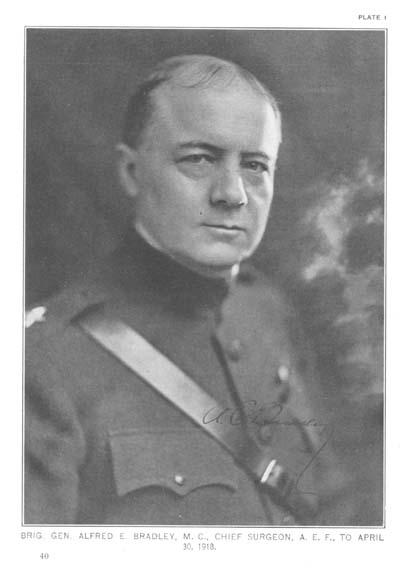
- Born: November 25, 1864; Jamestown, New York, US
- Died: December 17, 1922 (aged 58); Montgomery, Alabama, US
- Burial place: Arlington National Cemetery
- Military career
- Branch: United States Army
- Rank: Brigadier general
- Service number: 0-13408
- Commands: Hospital ship USS Relief, Chief Surgeon at General Headquarters (AEF)

Alfred Eugene Bradley (November 25, 1864 – December 17, 1922) was a career surgeon that served in the United States Army. He commanded the Hospital ship USS Relief and served as Chief Surgeon at General Headquarters for the American Expeditionary Forces during World War I.

== Early life and education ==
Bradley was born in Jamestown, New York. He graduated from Jefferson Medical College, in Philadelphia, in 1887. Bradley interned at Philadelphia Hospital from 1887 to 1888. On October 4, 1887, he married his wife, Letitia Follette.

== Military career ==
Bradley was appointed assistant surgeon, United States Army on October 29, 1888. He took part in the Pine Ridge campaign of 1890 and 1891. Bradley was promoted to captain, assistant surgeon, on October 29, 1893. He served as a major and was a brigade surgeon during the Spanish–American War.

From 1898 to 1899, he commanded the hospital ship USS Relief, which sailed around the world from New York to San Francisco. On November 10, 1899, he was honorably discharged from the volunteer service. Bradley was promoted to a major, medical corps on January 1, 1902.

From 1911 to 1913, he commanded the division hospital in Manila. Bradley was promoted to colonel, Medical Corps, on July 1, 1916, and from May 1916 to July 1917 he was an observer with the British at the American embassy in London. On August 5, 1917, Bradley was promoted to brigadier general and became the acting Chief Surgeon at General Headquarters (AEF), in Chaumont, France. He would receive the Distinguished Service Medal for his service. After developing lung trouble, he was found physically incapacitated, and was discharged from the national army on June 28, 1918. Bradley retired from the United States Army on March 13, 1920.

== Medals ==
Bradley received the Distinguished Service Medal in World War I under this citation "As chief surgeon, A. E. F., he gave his utmost energy and individual devotion to the duty of planning and organizing the work of the Medical Department in France during a period fraught with untold difficulties. To his foresight was largely due the successful operations of that department when it was called upon to meet the demands that were subsequently made upon it. War Department, General Order No. 12, 17 January 1919."

== Death and legacy ==
After retiring from the military, Bradley wrote for medical journals from his home. Bradley died on December 17, 1922, in Montgomery, Alabama, at the age of fifty-eight. He was buried at Arlington National Cemetery.

His papers are held by the Armed Forces Institute of Pathology Association Library, the Library of Congress, and the College of William & Mary.

== Bibliography ==
- Davis, Henry Blaine Jr. Generals in Khaki. Raleigh, NC: Pentland Press, 1998. ISBN 1571970886 OCLC 231779136
- Marquis Who's Who, Inc. Who Was Who in American History, the Military. Chicago: Marquis Who's Who, 1975. ISBN 0837932017 OCLC 657162692
