= Battle of Romanovka =

Battle in the Russian Civil War

- Part of the Allied intervention in the Russian Civil War, Russian Civil War
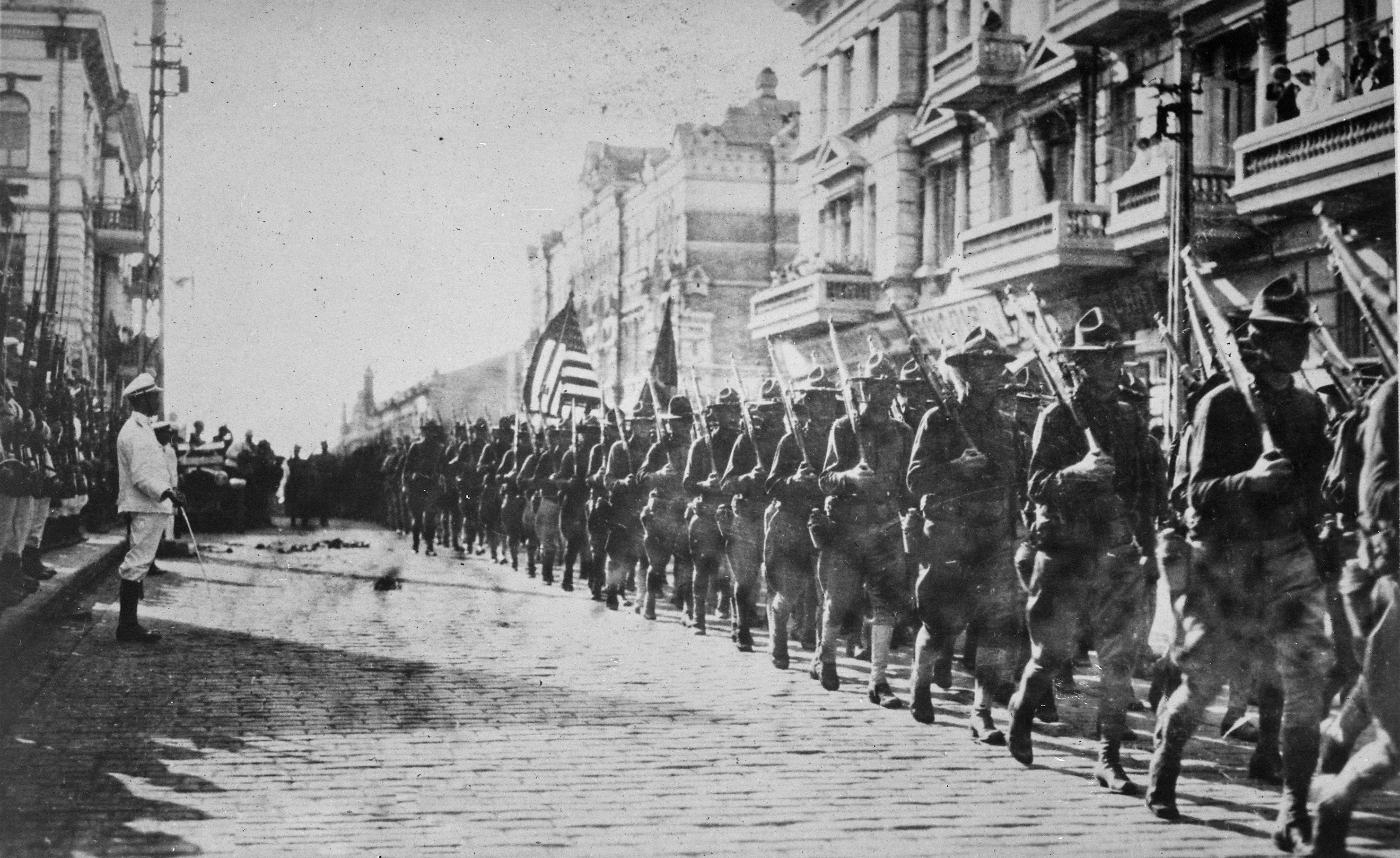
- American troops marching through Vladivostok in 1918, Japanese troops stand at attention on the left
Date	June 25, 1919
Location	Romanovka, Siberia, Russia
Result	American victory

Belligerents
United States	(Russian Soviet Federative Socialist Republic) Russia (Bolshevik)

Commanders and leaders
(United States) Lawrence Butler (WIA) (United States) James Lorimar	(Russian Soviet Federative Socialist Republic) Yakov Tryapitsyn (executed)

Strength
~72, plus a platoon of reinforcements	~400

Casualties and losses
24 killed 25 wounded	41-57 dead or missing Unknown wounded

The Battle of Romanovka was fought in June 1919 during the Russian Civil War. Russian Bolsheviks of Yakov Tryapitsyn launched a surprise attack on an American army camp at Romanovka, near Vladivostok. As a result of the engagement, the attacks were repelled. Romanovka and the Suchan Valley Campaign that followed were the final major engagements of the Russian Civil War involving the United States.

== Battle ==
Lieutenant Lawrence Butler was in command of the American garrison at Romanovka. His seventy-two men of Company A, 31st Infantry, were encamped at the base of a hill within the town limits. On the night of June 24, 1919, Lieutenant Butler placed a sentry at the top of the hill to watch for any approaching enemies. However, at 4:00 am on the following morning, the sun was coming up so the sentry relieved himself to prepare for reveille. Moments later the partisans attacked and because the sentry had abandoned his post, the Russians achieved a surprise attack by gaining control of the hill and firing on the camp below. Most of the American garrison was still asleep when bullets came ripping through their tents. Within the first few minutes nineteen Americans were killed and Lieutenant Butler was wounded, having a portion of his jaw shot away and another bullet wound to one of his legs. With hand signals Butler was able to direct his men to form a firing line. The Bolsheviks, numbering around 400 men, then attempted to surround the American position but the latter retreated, first to a large wood pile and then again to the back of a cabin, all while under heavy fire.

After that Butler sent one man to try to find help from other American units in the area. The messenger was shot while doing this but he managed to flag down a passing supply train guarded by a platoon of American troops under Lieutenant James Lorimar. When Lorimar learned of the situation, he dispatched half of his men to aid Lieutenant Butler in the defense of Romanovka. Lorimar's men found the garrison huddled together with Butler unconscious and lying on the ground near some ammunition crates. For several more moments the two sides skirmished but eventually the Bolsheviks retreated. On the same day, men of the 27th Infantry engaged partisan forces at Kraefski and Shmakovka, resulting in the wounding of six more American soldiers and another Bolshevik retreat.

== See also ==
- Polar Bear Expedition
- Siberian Intervention
- North Russia Campaign
- Battle of Shenkursk
