= Suchan Valley Campaign =

1919 US victory in the Russian Civil War

- Part of the Allied intervention in the Russian Civil War
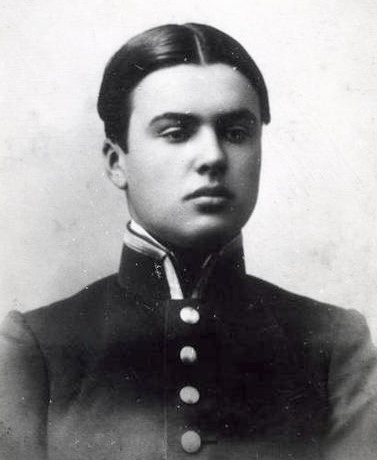
- Sergey Lazo, commander of the Red Partisan squads defending the region during the American offensive.
Date	July – August 1919
Location	Suchan, Primorye, Russia
Result	American victory

Belligerents
United States	(Russian Soviet Federative Socialist Republic) RSFSR

Commanders and leaders
(United States) Robert L. Eichelberger (United States) William S. Graves	(Russian Soviet Federative Socialist Republic) Sergey Lazo (executed)

Strength
3,520; USS Albany; USS New Orleans	4,000–6,000

Casualties and losses
22 killed 33 wounded	500 killed

The Suchan Valley Campaign was the clearing and occupation of the mining region around the Russian town of Suchan (currently Partizansk, Russia) in a climatically-unforgiving region of Russia's Siberia during the Russian Civil War. A relatively clean sweep, the operation inflicted heavy casualties on the Bolsheviks.

== Battle ==
With the failed Russian surprise assault against a numerically-inferior American force during the Battle of Romanovka in June, the Suchan Mines were entirely cut off from Vladivostok. Soviet control of these mines prevented the Americans from fulfilling specified duties in the region, so a three-pronged offensive was launched to clear the valley of armed opposition.

Five companies of the 31st Infantry, U.S. Army, took on the responsibility of clearing the Suchan, while every stretch of captured territory within the valley was handed over to garrison guard forces manned by the U.S. Marines and Navy.
