= List of states and regions involved in the Russian Civil War =

Russian Civil War
- Part of Russian Revolution; Revolutions of 1917–1923; Aftermath of World War I
Date	November 1917 – October 1923 (Note: In some areas of the former empire fighting continued until 1926; see Smele, J. (2016). The "Russian" Civil Wars, 1916–1926: Ten Years That Shook the World. Oxford University Press.)
Location	Former Russian Empire and the Russian Republic
Result	Bolshevik victory
Territorial changes	Establishment of the Soviet Union

List of states and regions involved in the Russian Civil War.

The Russian Civil War (Russian: Гражданская война в России) was fought across the territory of the former Russian Empire from November 1917 until 1923, between the Bolshevik government and the anti-Bolshevik forces known collectively as the White movement, together with a shifting array of peasant insurgents, nationalist governments in the borderlands, and Allied expeditionary forces. (Note: At the outbreak of the war Russia was still using the Old Style Julian calendar, thirteen days behind the Gregorian calendar. A decree of 24 January 1918 (O.S.) made Wednesday 31 January 1918 the last Julian date, followed by Thursday 14 February 1918; dates from that point are New Style only. White and émigré writers frequently continued to use Old Style dates after February 1918, which is the source of many discrepancies in the literature.)

== Overviews ==
- Russian Civil War
- Allied intervention in the Russian Civil War
- Central Powers intervention in the Russian Civil War
- Pro-independence movements in the Russian Civil War

== Russian Empire and borderlands ==
=== Ukraine ===
- 1918 Central Powers occupation of Ukraine
- Ukraine after the Russian Revolution
- Ukrainian People's Republic
- Ukrainian Soviet Socialist Republic
- Ukrainian War of Independence
- Ukrainian–Soviet War

=== Belarus ===
- Belarusian People's Republic
- Belarusian-Soviet conflict
- Byelorussian Soviet Socialist Republic

=== Finland ===
- Finnish Civil War
- Finnish Socialist Workers' Republic
- History of Finland (1917–present)
- Independence of Finland

=== Baltic states ===
- Estonian War of Independence
- Latvian War of Independence
- Lithuanian Wars of Independence
- Soviet westward offensive of 1918–1919

=== Poland ===
- Battle of Warsaw (1920)
- Causes of the Polish–Soviet War
- Polish–Soviet War

=== Caucasus ===
- Armeno-Georgian War
- Azerbaijan Democratic Republic
- Democratic Republic of Georgia
- First Republic of Armenia
- Red Army invasion of Armenia
- Red Army invasion of Azerbaijan
- Red Army invasion of Georgia
- Transcaucasian Democratic Federative Republic
- Transcaucasian Socialist Federative Soviet Republic

=== Central Asia ===
- Alash Autonomy
- Basmachi movement
- Central Asian Front of the Russian Civil War
- Turkestan Autonomy

=== Bessarabia and Moldova ===
- Moldavian Democratic Republic
- Romanian military intervention in Bessarabia
- Union of Bessarabia with Romania

=== Mongolia ===
- Mongolian Revolution of 1921
- Occupation of Mongolia
- Soviet intervention in Mongolia

=== Persia and China ===
- Chinese in the Russian Revolution and in the Russian Civil War
- Persian Socialist Soviet Republic

== Foreign intervention ==
=== Allied and associated powers ===
- American Expeditionary Force, North Russia
- American Expeditionary Force, Siberia
- Australia in the Allied intervention in the Russian Civil War
- British campaign in the Baltic (1918–1919)
- Canadian Siberian Expeditionary Force
- Czechoslovak Legion
- Japanese intervention in Siberia
- North Russia intervention
- Revolt of the Czechoslovak Legion
- Siberian intervention
- Southern Russia intervention
- United States and the Russian Revolution

=== Central Powers ===
- Caucasus campaign
- Central Powers intervention in the Russian Civil War
- Freikorps in the Baltic
- German Caucasus expedition
- Islamic Army of the Caucasus
- West Russian Volunteer Army

== See also ==
- Bibliography of the Russian Revolution and Civil War
- Outline of the Russian Revolution and Civil War
- The "Russian" Civil Wars, 1916–1926: Ten Years That Shook the World
- Russia in Flames: War, Revolution, Civil War, 1914–1921
- Russia in Revolution: An Empire in Crisis, 1890 to 1928
- Russia: Revolution and Civil War, 1917—1921
- The Russian Revolution: A New History
