= United States and the Russian Revolution =

American involvement in the revolution

American involvement in the Russian Revolutions was part of the wider Allied efforts to deter the Bolshevik takeover. The US welcomed the assumption of power by the Russian Provisional Government following the February Revolution, however, following the October Revolution, the relations with the Soviet Russian government quickly deteriorated. The US involvement in the Russian Civil War sought to contain Japanese territorial ambitions in Siberia and secure Allied supply lines, as well providing limited support to the White movement.

== Allied intervention ==
The United States responded to the Russian Revolution of 1917 by participating in the Allied intervention in the Russian Civil War with the Allies of World War I. The United States withheld diplomatic recognition of the Soviet Union until 1933.

Under his aide-mémoire, President Woodrow Wilson officially entered the United States into the Allied intervention in Russia. In his doctrine, Wilson called on several reasons behind his decision to intervene: to facilitate the safe exit of a stranded Czech Legion from Russia, to safeguard allied military stores located in northern Russia, to put pressure on the German Empire with the potential of an eastern front, and to facilitate self-determination with the hope of the creation of a democratic Russia. As Wilsonianism or Wilsonian Idealism was prevalent in Wilson's actions with the Mexican Revolution and the creation of the League of Nations, American intervention consisted of idealistic features as Wilson preferred the creation of a democratic government in Russia. This was seen when American troops, specifically the 339th Infantry Regiment, found themselves in routine engagements with Bolshevik forces in an effort to support Russian revolutionaries.

Following Wilson's decision, the 339th Infantry Regiment was mobilized and sent to Arkhangelsk, with a brief stop in England. Under British leadership, Generals F. C. Poole and Edmund Ironside, the 339th was tasked with operations on a railroad between Arkhangelsk and Lake Onega, including surrounding towns. The allied contingent found little success as fronts were stretched so wide that lines of communications and supply were difficult to procure. Before American forces withdrew from Arkhangelsk on June 7, 1919, 222 soldiers of its 5,000 man force were killed.

== American Relief Administration aid ==
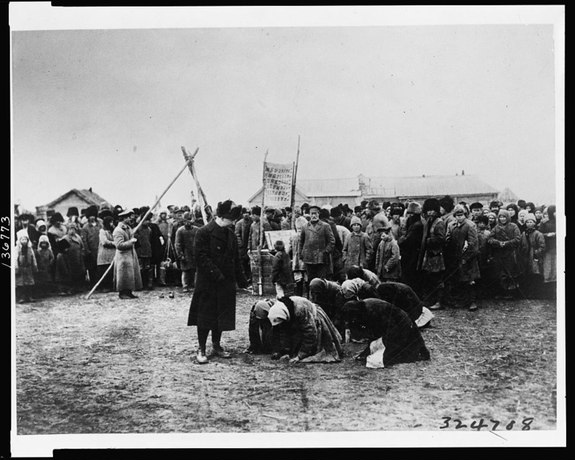
American Relief Administration operations in Russia, 1922

In 1921, to ease the devastating famine in the Russian SFSR that was triggered by the devastating civil war and by the Soviet government's war communism policies, the American Relief Administration's director in Europe, Walter Lyman Brown, began negotiating with the Russian First Deputy People's Commissar for Foreign Affairs, Maxim Litvinov, in Riga, Latvia (at that time not yet annexed by the USSR). An agreement was reached on August 21, 1921, and an additional implementation agreement was signed by Brown and People's Commissar for Foreign Trade Leonid Krasin on December 30, 1921. The U.S. Congress appropriated $20,000,000 for relief under the Russian Famine Relief Act of late 1921.

At its peak, the ARA employed 300 Americans, more than 120,000 Russians and fed 10.5 million people daily. Its Russian operations were headed by Col. William N. Haskell. The Medical Division of the ARA functioned from November 1921 to June 1923 and helped overcome the typhus epidemic then ravaging Russia. The ARA's operations in Russia were shut down on June 15, 1923, after it was discovered that Russia under Lenin renewed the export of grain.

== Domestic response ==
Inevitably, Americans became concerned about Bolshevism in the United States. Many viewed labor unions as the primary method by which radicals acted in American society. Cries for action against such radicals reached their peak after Attorney-General A. Mitchell Palmer's home was bombed and numerous bombs intended for other government officials were intercepted. Terror and outrage, remembered as the Red Scare, swept the country. Riots broke out in cities across the country against the Union of Russian Workers and other organizations that the public believed to be filled with Communist conspirators. In response to these riots, Palmer created the General Intelligence Division in the Justice Department. J. Edgar Hoover was selected as the leader of this new division that would investigate the identities and actions of suspected revolutionaries. Palmer, who was still not convinced of Bolshevik responsibility, was highly criticized for a lack of definitive action. However, once he believed the country to be in danger of a revolution, Palmer acted decisively. After meeting with his advisors, he decided that the most appropriate action was mass arrests and deportation of foreign radicals. It was on this premise that he ordered the first of the Palmer Raids. In these raids, Hoover and his agency orchestrated a series of massive dragnets and the simultaneous arrests of suspected revolutionaries in multiple citie; many suspects were arrested without warrants and suffered from physical injuries incurred from the raiding forces. These abuses of civil liberties were largely overlooked by the public, who enthusiastically backed Palmer and Hoover. They conducted these raids with the mindset that civil liberties like free speech and due process were a necessary sacrifice to preserve the Government of the United States from communist inflitration. Amid these raids, there was still little evidence that the Communists were even involved in the bombings or labor strikes, and many of those arrested were released from lack of evidence.

It was not until men such as Francis Fisher Kane, a member of the Justice Department, and Lewis F. Post, Acting Secretary, exposed the violation of civil liberties that the public began to question the actions of the Palmer Raids. With the economy stable once again and no violent anarchist acts since the bombing of Palmer's home, the public began to criticize Palmer once again for these violations. The Red Scare was coming to an end.

== Cold War implications ==
Once Americans left Arkhangelsk in 1919, distrust grew between communist Russia and capitalist America as the twentieth century developed. At the height of the Cold War, Nikita Khrushchev recalled America's Russian Expedition by saying "We remember the grim days when American soldiers went to our soldiers headed by their generals…Never have any of our soldiers been on American soil, but your soldiers were on Russian soil. These are facts." The creation of the Cold War evolved out of World War II, but American intervention in the Russian Revolution created a sentiment between the United States and the Soviet Union that either communism or capitalism should prevail.

== Results ==
World War II proved to be the high point of Soviet-U.S. relations, which would quickly drop off after the war. Journalist Harry Schwartz sums it up in his article in the July 7, 1963 New York Times: "Soviet-United States relations since the 1917 Bolshevik Revolution have gone through almost all possible phases from warm comradeship in arms to the deepest hostility".

== See also ==
- List of states and regions involved in the Russian Civil War
- Bibliography of the Russian Revolution and Civil War
- Outline of the Russian Revolution and Civil War
