= Legione Redenta =

Italian military formation composed by former Russian-captured POWs

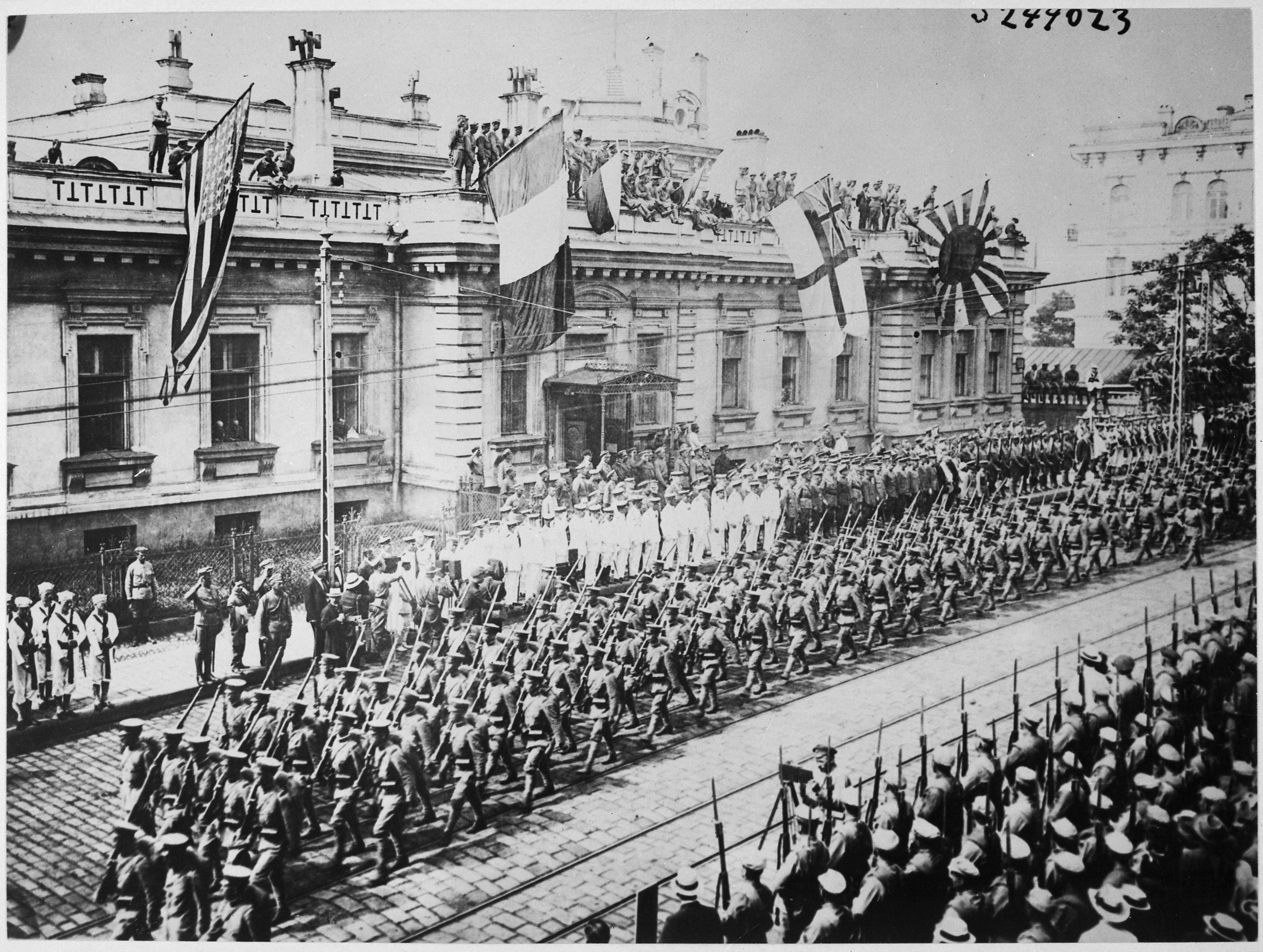
Allied troops parading in Vladivostok, 1918. By September 1918, there were 70,000 Japanese, 5,002 American, 1,400 Italian, 829 British and 107 French troops in and around the city

The Legione Redenta ("Redeemed Legion") was an Italian military formation that participated in the Siberian intervention during the Russian Civil War. It was formed from 2500 prisoners of war who had been captured by the Russians from the Austro-Hungarian Army.

The Legion fought against Bolshevik forces in Siberia and Manchuria, and was instrumental in protecting the Trans-Siberian Railway necessary for the Allied support to the White forces.

== History ==
With the Russian withdrawal from the war in 1918, German and Austro-Hungarian prisoners were allowed to return home as a result of the Treaty of Brest-Litovsk. Many of the Austro-Hungarian prisoners were of various nationalities reflecting the multi-ethnic composition of the empire.

A number of these prisoners were of Italian ethnicity, primarily from Trentino, Istria and Dalmatia (Italian nationalists considered these areas part of the Italia irredenta). The Italian government decided to form units from these prisoners (many of them said they were Italian irredentists). They were allowed to fight for Italy and swore an oath to the King of Italy, Victor Emmanuel III of Italy.

They were placed in a special new military unit called "Legione Redenta": this name was related to the word "redenta" (Italian for "redeemed") as a reference to the fact that the soldiers were "redeemed" from Austrian control and now were Italian legionaries.

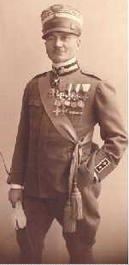
Colonel Cosma Manera

As a result, the "Legione Redenta" was created in the summer of 1918 in China and attached to the "Corpo di Spedizione Italiano in Estremo Oriente" (Italian Expedition in the Far East). Initially they were stationed in the Italian Concession in Tientsin. They were trained in Tientsin by Major Cosma Manera (it), an official of the Italian Carabinieri who chose the name "Redenta" for the unit.

The Italian legionaries played a small but important role during parts of Siberian Intervention, fighting alongside the Czechoslovak Legion.

The main areas of operations were Irkutsk, Harbin and Vladivostok.

The Legione Redenta fought until November 1919 when as part of the general Allied withdrawal from Russia, it returned to Italy, where it was welcomed with military honors.

== Irregular Brigata Savoia ==
The Italian legionaries were divided in 2 groups, one with black collar patches the other with red collar patches.

Those with the red collar patches were recruited initially by Andrea Compatangelo in an irregular Brigata Savoia and after heavy fighting, occupied the important railway hub of Krasnoyarsk for nearly two months before reaching Tientsin in summer 1918.

They fought alongside the Czechoslovak Legion and by using special armoured trains, reached the Italian concession in Tiensin, where they were officially made part of the Corpo di Spedizione Italiano.

== See also ==
- Siberian Intervention
- Allied intervention in the Russian Civil War
- Central Powers intervention in the Russian Civil War
- Concessions in Tianjin

== Bibliography ==
- Mautone, Antonio. Trentini ed Italiani contro l'Armata Rossa. La storia del Corpo di Spedizione in Estremo Oriente e dei Battaglioni Neri. Temi editrice. Trento, 2003
- Rallo, Michele. L'intervento italiano nella prima guerra Mondiale e la Vittoria Mutilata. Settimo Sigillo. Torino, 2007.
- Marie-Noëlle Snider-Giovannone. Les Forces alliées et associées en Extrême-Orient, 1918-1920. Les soldats austro-hongrois. Thèse Histoire moderne et contemporaine. Poitiers : Université de Poitiers, 2015.
- Stevenson, David. World War First - A Global History. Rizzoli. Milano, 2004 ISBN 88-17-00437-5
