= Cosma Manera =

Italian military commander (1876–1958)

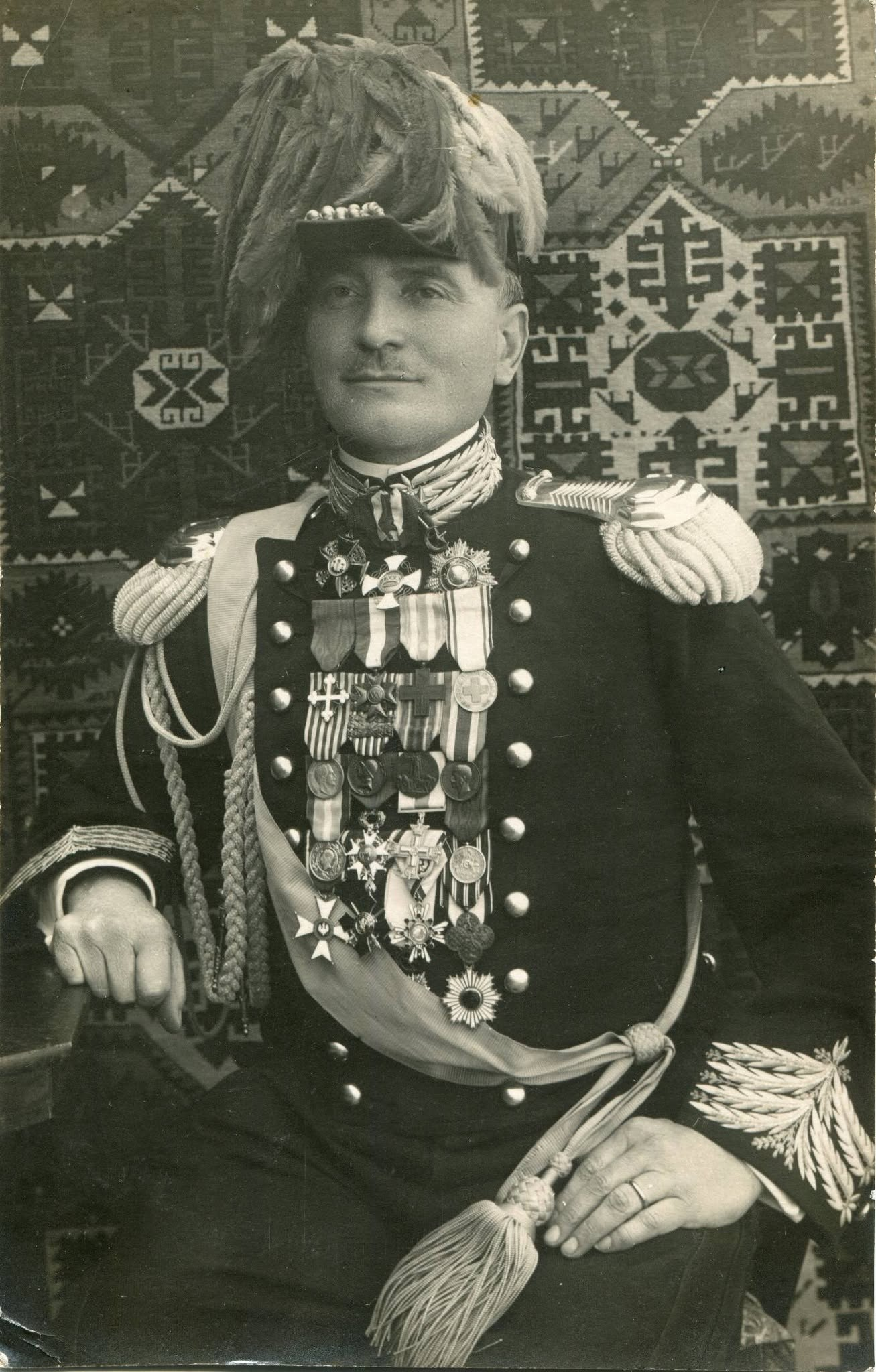
- Manera c. 1928
- Born: 15 June 1876; Asti, Kingdom of Italy
- Died: 25 February 1958 (aged 81); Rivalta di Torino, Republic of Italy
- Education: Military Academy of Modena
- Spouse: Amelia Maria Pozzolo (m. 1923)
- Children: 2
- Military career
- Allegiance: Italy
- Carabinieri: Regio Esercito
- Service years: 1894-1940
- Rank: Divisional General
- Commands: Legione Redenta
- Conflicts: World War I; Russian Civil War; Siberian Intervention

Cosma Manera (15 June 1876 – 25 February 1958) was an Italian military commander and attaché.

From 1916 to 1920, he brought 10,000 Italophone prisoners of war belonging to the Austro-Hungarian Army from the Russian Empire to Italy. With the start of the Russian Civil War and subsequent Allied intervention in the Russian Civil War, he continued this mission with the Legione Redenta. A military formation made up of the aforementioned prisoners.

== Early life ==
Cosma Manera was born in Asti to Delfina Ruggero and Ferdinando Manera, the latter of which was a divisional general of the Carabinieri. At the age of 11, he was sent to the Scuola Militare Teulié. While there, he learned the following foreign languages: English, French, German, Greek, Turkish, Bulgarian, Serbo-Croatian, and Russian. He completed his schooling at the Military Academy of Modena.

== Foreign missions ==
At the age of 18, he arrived in Catania as an infantry sub-lieutenant. Due to his linguistic abilities, he was invited to Crete with the 2nd Battalion of the 93rd infantry division to assess the aftermath of the Greco-Turkish War.

He transferred to the Carabinieri in 1901, and was stationed in Palermo and Verona before being posted to the Ministry of Foreign Affairs. In 1904, he joined an Italian military mission to Macedonia to reorganize Ottoman Gendarmerie as part of the Mürzsteg Agreement. He enlisted 1,400 Albanian, Arvanite, and South Slavic soldiers from both Muslim and Eastern Orthodox faiths.

Despite his attempt to reconcile Macedonia's diverse population, Manera was kidnapped by an Orthodox community and sentenced to death. His linguistic abilities, gentle demeanor, and the community's leader sharing the name Cosma spared him this fate, which allowed him to return to Italy.

His experience in Macedonia resulted in him serving as Italy's representative to the Balkan Committee of London in 1906. On August 5 1908, he returned to his original Carabinieri unit, the Legione Allievii, being promoted to captain in 1911. From February to July 1913 he was invited to a military mission in Independent Albania. This was followed with a trip to Berlin, which Manera undertook to improve his German, then to Russia for his first visit to its imperial court.

== World War I ==
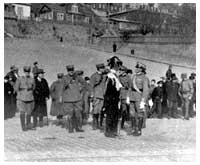
A ceremony for the Italian Military Mission to Siberia held in Kirsanov, 1917

At the start of WWI, Manera returned to Italy. His first mission would be organizing the surveillance of trainlines in the Cadore near the Italian frontline. After a brief mission to Benghazi, he was invited to Russia once again in 1916 to join a mission headed by colonel Achille Bassignano. In which roughly 20,000 Italophone Austro-Hungarian POWs dispersed throughout Siberia and Turkestan were to be repatriated. Arriving in Petrograd by sea, Manera continued along the White Sea, finding 4,000 Trentinese, Friulian, Giulian, and Istrian prisoners along the coast of Dvina Bay in Arkhangelsk. In March 1917, he used a captured Austro-Hungarian steamship to repatriate 1,700 of these Italian prisoners. In July 1917, he arrived in Moscow. Finding 57 officials and 2,600 soldiers in a concentration camp in Kirsanov.

== Russian Civil War ==
Following the October Revolution, the situation for Allied military personnel in Russia became dangerous, prompting Manera and his men to flee towards Siberia. He reached an agreement with the station master of Chelyabinsk to attach a freightcar containing 50 Italians to each train leaving the city. By December 1917, 4,000 of these soldiers reached Krasnoyarsk. There, they would be retrained and reorgainzed into four companies of three platoons each. Due to the support of the Marquess Gemma Guerrieri Gonzaga, supplies for the troops' defense arrived. After arriving at Vladivostok, Manera intended to repatriate these soldiers by sea. This plan was unsuccessful, though he was able to arrange for some trains from Vladivostok to the Italian concession of Tianjin in China. The rest of these soldiers would be stationed in Harbin and Peking.

=== Legione Redenta ===
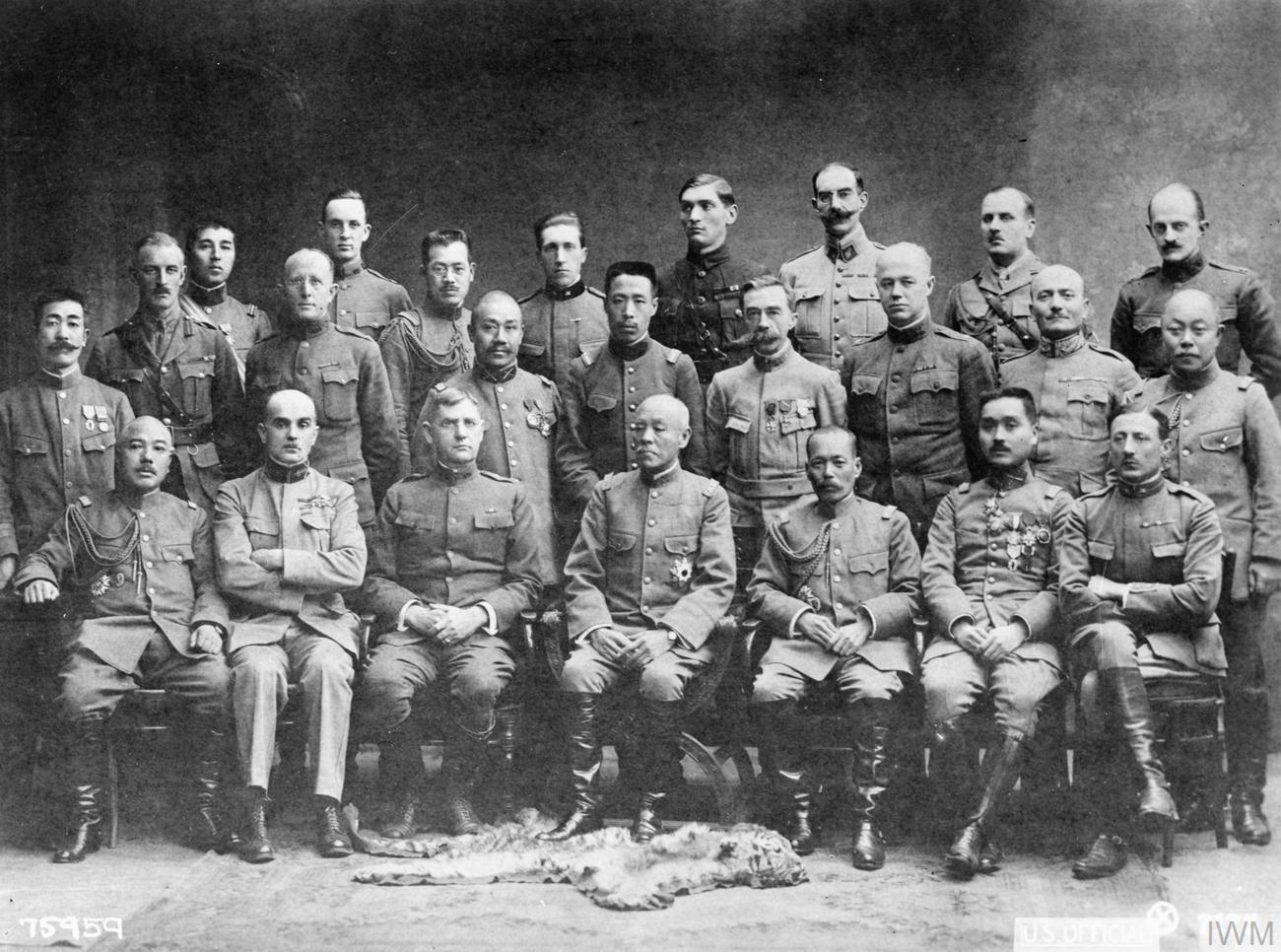
Manera (Second to last in central row) photographed alongside other Allied commanders of the Siberian Intervention in 1918

In February 1918, Cosma Manera came into contact with White Army representatives. One month later, the Legione Redenta was formed in preparation for any potential intervention in the Russian Civil War. Also in March, Manera became the military attaché to the Italian embassy in Tokyo while remaining in Peking.

Following the Treaty of Brest-Litovsk, Manera participated in an interallied landing at the Kola peninsula to prevent any abandoned war materiel from being repurposed by the German military. On September 6 1918, command of the Volunteer Far East Expeditionary Battalion passed from him to Gustavo Fassini-Camossi, whom had left Naples July. Manera left for Tokyo to fulfill his attaché duties. Despite his relocation, he continued to return to Vladivostok to search and rescue operations for Italian prisoners. He found 1,700 at this time, and arranged them into eight companies and a "prisoner of war" unit containing soldiers which had not sworn loyalty to the Kingdom of Italy.

In February 1920, Manera left Vladivostok through American merchant marine vessels. After a stop in Egypt, he arrived in Trieste after two months of traveling. His reputation in Italy as "Father of the Irredenti", spurred his promotion to lieutenant colonel. After a few months, by order of the Prime Minister, he was sent to Batum in Georgia to search for other missing Italians in Hungary, Bulgaria and Romania.

In August 1921, Manera returned to Rome. He was assigned to the mobile battalion of the Carabinieri, later serving with the Salerno, Rome, and Ancona Legions.

== Postwar activities ==
On April 30 1923, Manera married Amelia Maria Pozzolo. He would go on to have two sons with her. Throughout the 1920s, he would partake in military missions to France, Greece, England, Austria Germany, Spain, Portugal, Bulgaria, China, Egypt and the Soviet Union. on the first of April 1927, he was promoted to colonel and commander of the Carabinieri's Rome Legion, before being transferred to the Legion of Milan in 1929.

He was briefly involved with an inquiry into the Italia disaster, though fascist authorities removed him from the investigation. While he thwarted an assassination attempt against Victor Emmanuel III at a Milan trade fair, he was still found culpable for having failed to locate the assassin's bomb which had exploded in a crowd of fairgoers. As a result, he was demoted to command the Livorno and Bologna Legions instead.

At his request, he was placed on auxiliary duty in 1932. One year later, he would be promoted to brigadier general.

In 1940 he was transferred to Italy's reserves and promoted to a divisional general. However, Manera's military career was dormant at the time of his promotion, owing to his distaste for fascism by this time. He instead occupied himself with his family and other personal affairs, while periodically writing articles for newspapers and magazines.

He died at his home in Rivalta di Torino in 1958 at the age of 81 and received a state funeral.

== Awards and honors ==
=== Italian ===
- Order of the Crown of Italy - October 1908
- War Merit Cross
- Commemorative Medal of the Libyan Campaigns - 1913
- Commemorative Medal for the Italo-Austrian War 1915–1918 - 1920
- 1914–1918 Inter-Allied Victory medal - 1920
- Commemorative Medal of the Unity of Italy - 1922
- Order of Saints Maurice and Lazarus - 1923
- Cross for Long Military Service

=== Foreign ===
- Order of the Medjidie (Ottoman Empire)
- Legion of Honour (France)
- Military Cross (United Kingdom)
- Order of San Marino (San Marino)

== Bibliography ==
- "Cosma Manera".
- Giuseppe Ciampaglia: La vita e gli aerei di Roberto Bartini. I.B.N. editore Roma 2010 ISBN 978-88-7565-076-6

== See also ==
- Legione Redenta
- Siberian intervention
