= Murmanians =

Murmańczycy (Murmansk Group or Murmanians) was a common name for Polish military formations which fought against the Bolsheviks in the area of Murmansk and Arkhangelsk, northern Russia, in 1918–1919. They were part of the Allied intervention in the Russian Civil War.

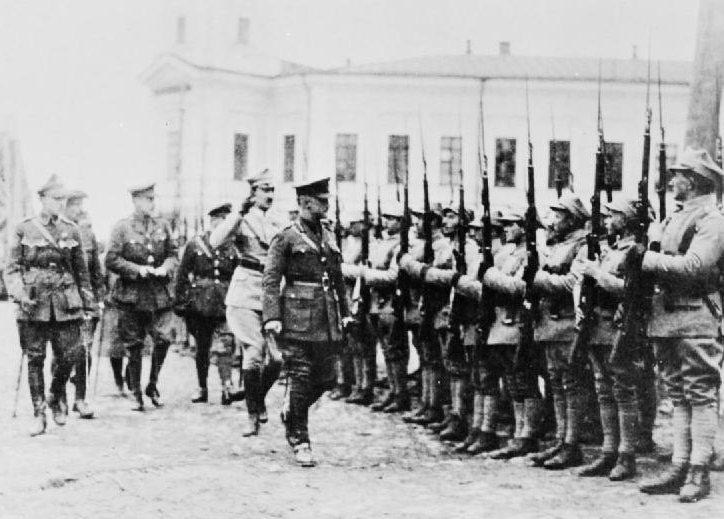
British officers, led by Sir Frederick Poole, conferring decorations for bravery upon Polish soldiers of Murmansk Battalion

== Background ==
In May and June 1918, three Polish Eastern Armed Groups were dissolved (see Polish Armed Forces in the East (1914–20)). Ethnic Polish officers, who had formerly served in the Imperial Russian Army, gathered in Kiev and created the so-called Military Commission, backed by a numerous Polish community, which at that time resided in Moscow. General Józef Haller was named commandant in chief of all forces in the East.

On June 15 Haller signed an agreement with the Western Allies, upon which Polish military units were to be created in northern Russia, in the area of Murmansk and Arkhangelsk, which at that time was under Allied control. Polish soldiers were to be gradually transported from these ports to France, to join the Polish Army which had been created there.

As a result, thousands of ethnic Polish soldiers of the former Imperial Russian Army, as well as Polish prisoners of war who had served in either the German or Austro-Hungarian army, headed northwards. The Bolsheviks, who had found out about the agreement from German ambassador Wilhelm von Mirbach, captured and shot on the spot a number of Poles, and as a result, less than 1000 reached Murmansk.

In June 1918, the Military Commission created a Mobilization Department, headed by Colonel Michal Rola-Zymierski. It was tasked with directing Polish soldiers to the area of Murmansk, where 4th Division of Polish Rifles was created. The Department operated until mid-July 1918, when its activities were hampered by the Bolsheviks, upon order of Lev Trotsky. Under the circumstances, a new center for Polish soldiers was quickly opened in Kuban.

On June 20, 1918, General Haller left Moscow in a French hospital train, and six days later arrived at Murmansk, where he met with General Sir Frederick Cuthbert Poole. As a result of this meeting, Polish soldiers were ordered to gather in the town of Kola, where an office was opened. On July 4, General Haller left Russia and went to Scotland aboard a British Royal Navy destroyer. Before leaving, he named General Lucjan Zeligowski as the new commander of Polish Forces in the East.

Due to an insufficient number of soldiers and officers, as many of the experienced staff members were gradually sent to France in order to reinforce Polish units there, Zeligowski decided not to create a division. Several smaller units were formed instead, with the material support of the British, with whom Poles cooperated against the Bolsheviks. The first Polish unit in northern Russia was created in June 1918 in Kola: it consisted of a company of rifles, together with a platoon of machine guns (altogether some 200 men). The second unit was the so-called Northern Dvina River Detachment (Oddzial Dzwinski), formed of Polish soldiers from Arkhangelsk. When on July 31, 1918, an antibolshevik rebellion broke out in this city, Poles joined the fight.

In October 1918, the Polish Detachment in Kola, which was under British authority, was transferred to Arkhangelsk. Meanwhile, another Polish unit was created in Onega. By mid-January 1919, the number of Murmanczycy was estimated at 22 officers and 286 soldiers.

== Fighting Against the Bolsheviks ==
Despite growing difficulties, all units were equipped and ready to fight. They were involved in the Allied intervention in Russia until mid-September 1919, when all soldiers were evacuated from Arkhangelsk to Poland. Before that, Polish forces engaged the Bolsheviks in the Kola Peninsula, also protecting the rail line from Arkhangelsk to Vologda. General Sir Edmund Ironside, who commanded the Murmanczycy, regarded them as excellent soldiers.

== Further Fate of Murmanczycy ==
All Murmanczycy had returned to Poland by December 1919, but soon afterwards they were drafted into the Polish Army, and once again fought the Bolsheviks, as they were merged with the 64th Grudziądz Infantry Regiment, as its 3rd Battalion.

In 1938, during the Second Polish Republic, and on the initiative of the Association of Murmanczycy, the 64th Infantry Regiment was renamed the 64th Pomeranian Regiment of Murmansk Rifles.

In the interbellum period and after 1990, Polish involvement in northern Russia has been commemorated on the Tomb of the Unknown Soldier, Warsaw, as "MURMAN 1918".

== See also ==
- Polish Armed Forces in the East (1914–20)
- Blue Army (Poland)
- Polish Legions in World War I
- Puławy Legion
