= Topsa =

Topsa Топса
- Village
- Location within Arkhangelsk Oblast Location within Russia
- Coordinates: 62°35′N 43°37′E
- Country: Russia
- Region: Arkhangelsk Oblast
- District: Vinogradovsky District
- Time zone: UTC+3:00

Topsa (Russian: Топса) is a rural locality (a village) in Rochegodskoye Rural Settlement of Vinogradovsky District, Arkhangelsk Oblast, Russia. The population was 288 as of 2010.

== Geography ==
Topsa is located 61 km southeast of Bereznik (the district's administrative centre) by road. Klykovskaya is the nearest rural locality.
