= Annenkovo =

Annenkovo Анненково
- Village
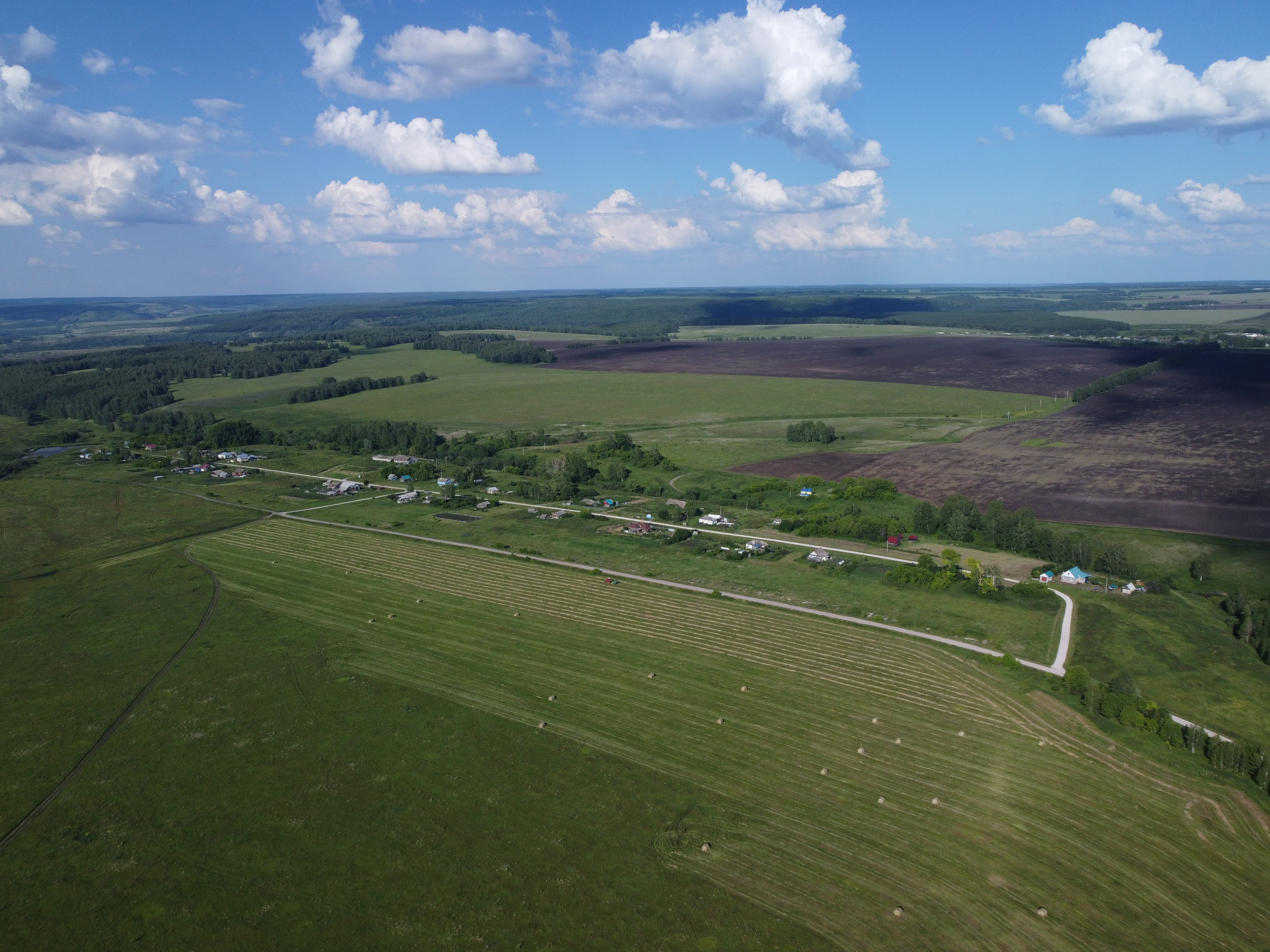
- View of Annenkovo.

- Location within Bashkortostan Location within Russia
- Coordinates: 54°03′N 54°15′E
- Country: Russia
- Region: Bashkortostan
- District: Belebeyevsky District
- Time zone: UTC+5:00

Annenkovo (Russian: Анненково) is a rural locality (a village) in Donskoy Selsoviet, Belebeyevsky District, Bashkortostan, Russia. The population was 23 as of 2010. There is 1 street.

== Geography ==
Annenkovo is located 15 km southeast of Belebey (the district's administrative centre) by road. Pakhar is the nearest rural locality.
