= Outline of the Russian Civil War =

Overview of and topical guide to the Russian Civil War

Russian Civil War
- Part of the Russian Revolution and the Revolutions of 1917–1923
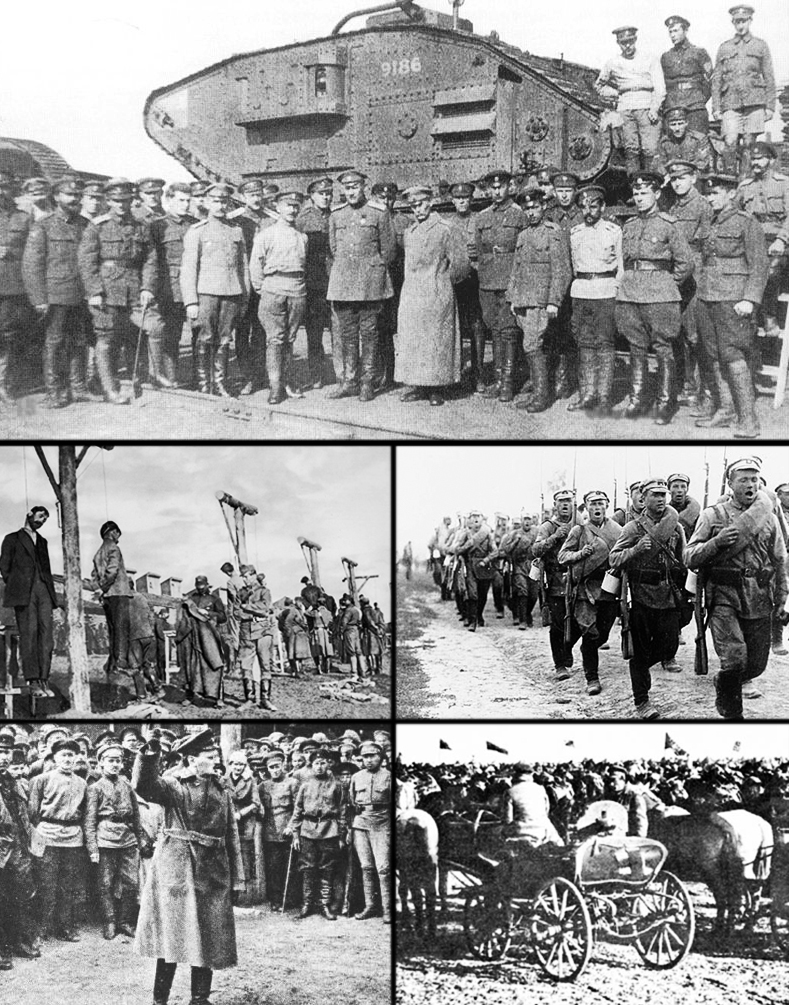
- Scenes of the Russian Civil War
Date	7 November 1917 – 16 June 1923 (Note: In some areas of the former empire fighting continued until 1926; see Smele, J. (2016). The "Russian" Civil Wars, 1916–1926: Ten Years That Shook the World. Oxford University Press.)
Location	Former Russian Empire
Result	Bolshevik victory
Territorial changes	Defeat and dissolution of the White movement and of the independent border states in the Caucasus and Central Asia; Independence of Finland, Estonia, Latvia, Lithuania and Poland confirmed; Establishment of the Soviet Union on 30 December 1922

The following outline is provided as an overview of and topical guide to the Russian Civil War.

The Russian Civil War (Russian: Гражданская война в России) was fought across the territory of the former Russian Empire from November 1917 until 1923, between the Bolshevik government and the anti-Bolshevik forces known collectively as the White movement, together with a shifting array of peasant insurgents, nationalist governments in the borderlands, and Allied expeditionary forces. (Note: At the outbreak of the war Russia was still using the Old Style Julian calendar, thirteen days behind the Gregorian calendar. A decree of 24 January 1918 (O.S.) made Wednesday 31 January 1918 the last Julian date, followed by Thursday 14 February 1918; dates from that point are New Style only. White and émigré writers frequently continued to use Old Style dates after February 1918, which is the source of many discrepancies in the literature.)

== Overview ==
- Russian Civil War – the 1917–1923 war that was triggered by the October Revolution.
  - Central Asian Front of the Russian Civil War – theater in the old imperial provinces of Turkestan, Khiva, Bukhara and Transcaspia; the longest-running theater, opening in 1916, with organized resistance continuing until 1934.
  - Eastern Front of the Russian Civil War – theater against Kolchak's forces and the Czechoslovak Legion, active from May 1918 to June 1923.
  - Eastern Transbaikalian Front – theater in the Transbaikal region, where Soviet partisans fought Semyonov's forces from April 1919 to October 1920.
  - Far Eastern Front in the Russian Civil War – theater in Siberia and the Russian Far East, active from late 1917 to late 1923, fought by a succession of White commanders alongside Japanese and American expeditionary units.
  - Southern Front of the Russian Civil War – theater against the Volunteer Army and Armed Forces of South Russia led by Lavr Kornilov and later Anton Denikin, active from November 1917 to April 1921.

=== Related conflicts ===
- Estonian War of Independence – Estonia's war against Soviet Russia and the Landeswehr.
- Finnish Civil War – war between Reds and Whites in Finland, January–May 1918.
- Latvian War of Independence – Latvia's war against Soviet, German and Bermontian forces.
- Lithuanian Wars of Independence – Lithuania's wars against Soviet, Bermontian and Polish forces.
- Polish–Soviet War – war between the Second Polish Republic and Soviet Russia and Soviet Ukraine, 1919–1921.
- Ukrainian War of Independence – the wars fought over Ukraine, 1917–1921.

== Background ==
- Eastern Front (World War I) – the Russian theater of World War I.
- October Revolution – the second of two revolutions in Russia in 1917, known in Soviet historiography as the Great October Socialist Revolution. It was planned and carried out by the Bolsheviks under the leadership of Vladimir Lenin.
- Russian Revolution – the revolutionary period of 1917, comprising the February Revolution and the October Revolution.
- World War I – major armed conflict between the Allied Powers and the Central Powers. (Note: The principal Allied Powers were the French Third Republic, the British Empire, the Russian Empire, the Kingdom of Italy, the Empire of Japan and the United States. The main Central Powers were the German Empire, Austria-Hungary and the Ottoman Empire.) Russia suffered social upheaval during the war, followed by a political and military collapse in 1917 that led to the abdication of Nicholas II and the revolution.

== Military events ==
=== 1917: seizure of power and armed conflicts ===
==== Campaigns ====
- Civil War on the Don (8 November 1917 – 27 March 1920) – Don Cossacks and the White movement fought Bolshevik forces for the Don Host Oblast.

==== Uprisings ====
- Aleksandrovsk Bolshevik Uprising (25 December 1917 – 2 January 1918) – Workers took up arms against the Central Rada in Oleksandrivsk.
- Dubno Garrison Revolt (3–4 October 1917 [O.S. 20–21 September]) – The garrison of Dubno in Volhynia, just behind the World War I front, mutinied.
- Junker mutiny (11 November 1917 [O.S. 29 October]) – Cadets of the Petrograd military schools rose against the Bolsheviks.
- Kerensky–Krasnov uprising (8–13 November 1917 [O.S. 26–31 October]) – Kerensky's attempt to reverse the October Revolution and take back power.
- Kiev Bolshevik Uprising (8–13 November 1917) – Bolshevik and Central Rada forces drove the Provisional Government's garrison out of Kiev; power in the city passed to the Rada.
- Kiev November uprising (1917) (11–12 December 1917 [O.S. 29–30 November]) – Bolshevik attempt to overthrow the Central Rada in Kiev.
- Moscow Bolshevik Uprising (7–15 November 1917) – Bolshevik rising in Moscow, where the longest fighting of the October Revolution took place.
- October Revolution (7 November 1917 [O.S. 25 October]) – Bolshevik rising in Petrograd under Lenin, which overthrew the Russian Provisional Government.
- Odesa Arsenal November Uprising (11–12 December 1917 [O.S. 30 November – 1 December]) – Bolshevik attempt to overthrow the Odessa council of the Ukrainian People's Republic.
- Semyonov's Rebellion (November–December 1917) – Cossack captain Grigory Semyonov's revolt against Soviet rule in Transbaikal.
- Tashkent rebellion (1917) (September – 13 November 1917) – Fighting in Tashkent between revolutionary forces and troops loyal to the Provisional Government.
- Vinnytsia Bolshevik Uprising (10–12 November 1917 [O.S. 28–30 October]) – Bolshevik rising in Vinnytsia during the October Revolution.

=== Southern Front: Don, Kuban, Ukraine, Crimea ===
==== Campaigns ====
- Advance on Moscow (1919) (3 July – 18 November 1919) – The White drive on Moscow, which Denikin expected to decide the war.
- Donbas-Don operation (8 January – 25 February 1918) – Red forces under Antonov-Ovseyenko attacked Kaledin's Cossacks and Volunteer detachments in the Donbas and on the Don.
- Iași–Don March (11 March – 7 May 1918) – Drozdovsky's volunteers marched from Iași on the Romanian front to the Don to join Kornilov.
- Ice March (22 February – 13 May 1918) – First Kuban Campaign; the Volunteer Army retreated from Rostov into the Kuban, hoping the Kuban Cossacks would join it.
- Katerynoslav March (27 November 1918 – 2 January 1919) – The Ukrainian State's 8th Corps moved from Katerynoslav to Crimea to join Denikin.
- Kuban Offensive (22 June – November 1918) – Second Kuban Campaign; the outnumbered Whites took the Kuban.
- Northern Taurida Operation (6 June – 3 November 1920) – Reds and Wrangel's Whites fought for Northern Taurida, the mainland north of Crimea.
- Steppe March (25 February – 18 May 1918) – Don Cossacks under Ataman Popov withdrew to the river Sal rather than follow the Volunteer Army into the Kuban.

==== Battles and operations ====
- Battle for the Donbas (1919) (12 January – 31 May 1919) – Whites held off Red attacks on the Don Host Oblast and occupied the Donbas after heavy fighting.
- Battle of Dolakovo (February 1919) – Ingush detachments fought Denikin's Volunteer Army at Dolakovo and Kantyshevo as the Whites pushed on Vladikavkaz.
- Battle of Kiev (December 1919) (10–16 December 1919) – The last of the year's battles for Kiev, in which Bolshevik troops drove the Whites out.
- Battle of Obytichnyi Spit (15 September 1920) – Naval battle in the Sea of Azov.
- Battle of Tsaritsyn (July 1918 – January 1920) – Reds and Whites contested Tsaritsyn, a port on the Volga.
- Capture of Kiev by the White Army (30–31 August 1919) – The White Army took Kiev from the Red Army without a fight.
- Cherek Campaign (1919) (February–March 1919) – White counter-insurgency operation in the Cherek Gorge.
- Donbas operation (1919) (18 December 1919 – 6 January 1920) – The Red Southern Front retook the Donbas from the Armed Forces of South Russia.
- Evacuation of Novorossiysk (March 1920) – Whites and refugees were evacuated from Novorossiysk; thousands were left behind and killed by Red Army and Green forces.
- Evacuation of the Crimea (13–16 November 1920) – Wrangel's army and civilians left Crimea by sea, ending the fighting on the Southern Front.
- Kharkiv Operation (December 1919) (24 November – 12 December 1919) – Yegorov's Southern Front attacked Denikin's troops at Kharkiv.
- Kharkiv Operation (June 1919) (20–25 June 1919) – Whites captured Kharkiv, an industrial center, in preparation for the drive on Moscow.
- Khopyor–Don Operation (20 November – 8 December 1919) – Red 9th Army offensive against the Don Army to reach the Don and secure the Southern Front's left wing.
- Manych Operation (1919) (April–May 1919) – Red 10th Army pushed across the Manych at the flank and rear of the Whites holding Rostov-on-Don.
- North Caucasus Operation (1920) (17 January – 7 April 1920) – Caucasian Front offensive that broke White resistance in the North Caucasus, after which the remnants of the Volunteer Army sailed to Crimea.
- Northern Caucasus Operation (1918–1919) (December 1918 – March 1919) – The Whites overran the North Caucasus and the Reds fell back on Astrakhan and the Volga delta.
- Odessa Operation (1919) (20–24 August 1919) – White amphibious landing at Odessa, supported by an anti-Bolshevik rising inside the city.
- Odessa Operation (1920) (11 January – 8 February 1920) – The Reds retook Odessa, capturing many White soldiers despite an evacuation by sea.
- Orel–Kursk operation (11 October – 18 November 1919) – Red offensive around Orel and Kursk which halted the Volunteer Army's drive on Moscow.
- Rostov–Novocherkassk Operation (6–10 January 1920) – Red advance on the Don which split the White army in two.
- Siege of Perekop (1920) (7–17 November 1920) – Red assault through the Perekop and Chongar defenses into Crimea.
- Sinking of ships of the Black Sea Fleet in Tsemes Bay (18 June 1918) – Warships were scuttled in Tsemes Bay off Novorossiysk rather than handed to Germany.
- Southern Front counteroffensive (14 August – 12 September 1919) – Red August counteroffensive against Denikin.
- Ulagay's Landing (14 August – 7 September 1920) – Wrangel's seaborne raid into the Kuban under Sergei Ulagay.
- Voronezh–Kastornoye operation (1919) (13 October – 16 November 1919) – Red offensive by the 8th and 13th Armies on the left wing of the Southern Front.
- Voronezh–Povorino Operation (January 1919) – Fighting between Reds and Whites around Voronezh and the railway station at Povorino.

==== Uprisings ====
- Vyoshenskaya Uprising (11 March – 8 June 1919) – Upper Don Cossacks rose against the Bolsheviks under Pavel Kudinov, centered on the village of Vyoshenskaya.

=== Eastern Front: Volga, Urals, Siberia, Far East ===
==== Campaigns ====
- Eastern Front counteroffensive (28 April – July 1919) – Red counterattack that turned Kolchak back permanently.
- Great Siberian Ice March (14 November 1919 – March 1920) – 2,000 km (1,200 mi) winter retreat of Kolchak's army from Omsk to Chita.
- Khabarovsk Campaign (November 1921 – March 1922) – Molchanov's White advance on Khabarovsk and its reversal.
- Spring offensive of the White Army (4 March – 29 April 1919) – Kolchak's drive west toward the Volga.
- Starving March (winter 1919–1920) – Dutov's Orenburg Army retreated across Kazakhstan toward the Chinese border.

==== Battles and operations ====
- Battle of Barnaul (1918) (13–15 June 1918) – Three days of fighting between Siberian factions for Barnaul.
- Battle of Lake Baikal (16 August 1918) – Naval action fought by Czechoslovak forces on Lake Baikal.
- Battle of Lipyagi (4 June 1918) – Čeček's legionaries beat Bolshevik troops at a Volga railway station.
- Battle of Makanchi (28 July – 2 August 1918) – White and Red fighting near Makanchi in eastern Kazakhstan.
- Battle of Volochayevka (5–14 February 1922) – Red victory at Volochayevka station that decided the Far Eastern Front.
- Capture of Kazan by the White Army (1–7 August 1918) – Whites and the Legion took Kazan on the Volga.
- Chita Operations (10 April – 31 October 1920) – Far Eastern Republic attacks to clear the White hold on Chita in Transbaikal.
- Kazan Operation (5–10 September 1918) – Red counter-offensive that retook Kazan from the Legion and Komuch.
- Perm Operation (1918–19) (29 November 1918 – 28 January 1919) – Kolchak's capture of Perm, known to the Reds as the Perm catastrophe.
- Simbirsk Operation (September 1918) – Red offensive against Kappel's People's Army and the Legion at Simbirsk.
- Spassk operation (7–9 October 1922) – Storming of Spassk, part of the last major operation of the war.
- Syzran–Samara Operation (14 September – 9 October 1918) – Red offensive that broke the People's Army of Komuch.

==== Uprisings ====
- 1918 Yakut revolt (28 February – 1 July 1918) – Yakut rejection of Bolshevik rule and a short-lived Yakut republic.
- 1921 Yakut revolt (2 September 1921 – 16 June 1923) – Final set of military engagements of the Russian Civil War.
- Arsk uprising (25 October – 15 November 1918) – Tatar peasant rising in Kazan Governorate against grain requisitioning.
- Chapan rebellion (3 March – April 1919) – One of the largest peasant risings against the Bolsheviks on the middle Volga.
- Izhevsk–Votkinsk Uprising (8 August – 12 November 1918) – Armed workers of the Izhevsk and Votkinsk plants rose against the Bolsheviks.
- Minusinsk Uprising (9 November – 7 December 1918) – Siberian peasants near Minusinsk rose against White requisitioning and conscription.
- Peasant rebellion of Sorokino (early 1921) – Rising against war communism in Altai Krai and the Kuzbass.
- Pitchfork Uprising (4 February – mid-March 1920) – Peasant rising against war communism in what is now Tatarstan and Bashkortostan.
- Revolt of the Czechoslovak Legion (14 May – October 1918) – The Legion seized the Trans-Siberian Railway and opened full-scale war in the east.
- West Siberian rebellion (31 January 1921 – December 1922) – Largest of the peasant risings, broken by the Red Army and famine.

=== Central Russia and the upper Volga ===
==== Uprisings ====
- Left SR uprising (6–7 July 1918) – Left Socialist Revolutionaries rebelled against their Bolshevik partners in Moscow.
- Livny Uprising (August 1918) – Among the first peasant revolts against grain requisitioning, with 10,000 to 12,000 taking part.
- Rybinsk Uprising (8 July 1918) – Savinkov's Union for the Defense of the Motherland and Freedom launched an anti-Bolshevik revolt at Rybinsk.
- Sheksna uprising (1–4 December 1918) – Rebels seized Sheksna station and cut the Cherepovets to Vologda railway.
- Tambov Rebellion (19 August 1920 – mid-1922) – One of the largest peasant revolts against the Bolshevik government, centered on Tambov.
- Yaroslavl Uprising (6–21 July 1918) – Savinkov's organization and townspeople held Yaroslavl against the Bolsheviks for two weeks.

=== North-west, the Baltics and Belarus ===
- Estonian War of Independence – War between Estonia and Soviet Russia, and later the pro-German Landeswehr.
- Finnish Civil War (January – May 1918) – War for control of newly independent Finland between Reds and Whites.
- Latvian War of Independence – Series of conflicts in Latvia between Latvian, Soviet, German and Bermontian forces.
- Lithuanian Wars of Independence – Three wars fought by Lithuania against Soviet, Bermontian and Polish forces.

==== Campaigns ====
- Soviet westward offensive of 1918–1919 (18 November 1918 – March 1919) – Red advance into areas left by German Ober Ost garrisons withdrawing to Germany.

==== Battles and operations ====
- Battle of Petrograd (28 September – 14 November 1919) – White campaign to take Petrograd, led by Yudenich's Northwestern Army.
- Ice Cruise of the Baltic Fleet (February–April 1918) – Ships of the Baltic Fleet moved from Reval and Helsinki to Kronstadt through the ice.

==== Uprisings ====
- East Karelian uprising (6 November 1921 – 21 March 1922) – East Karelian rebels, backed from Finland, fought to break away from Soviet Russia.
- Krasnaya Gorka mutiny (13–16 June 1919) – Anti-Bolshevik mutiny at coastal forts west of Petrograd, suppressed in four days.
- Kronstadt rebellion (1–18 March 1921) – Sailors, naval infantry and civilians at Kronstadt rose against the Bolshevik government.
- Nieśwież uprising (14–19 March 1919) – Pro-Polish rising by residents of Nieśwież in Belarus, put down within a week.
- Revolt of the Ingrian Finns (January 1919 – 5 December 1920) – Ingrian Finns revolted against Soviet rule in Ingria, ending with the collapse of the Kirjasalo republic.
- Slutsk uprising (27 November – 31 December 1920) – Belarusian forces near Slutsk fought without success for independence from Soviet rule.

=== Ukraine ===
==== Campaigns ====
- First Winter Campaign (6 December 1919 – 6 May 1920) – UNR army guerrilla campaign behind Red lines to keep a Ukrainian force in the field.
- Second Winter Campaign (October–November 1921) – Final UNR raid into Soviet Ukraine, defeated by Bolshevik forces.
- Ukrainian anti-Soviet campaign (1919) (July–September 1919) – Joint UNR and Galician offensive against Soviet forces, aimed at Kiev and Odessa.

==== Battles and operations ====
- 1919 Soviet invasion of Ukraine (2 January – 31 August 1919) – Offensive by the Red Ukrainian Front against the Ukrainian People's Republic.
- Battle of Dibrivka (30 September 1918) – Makhno's insurgents and local peasants defeated Central Powers occupation troops in southern Ukraine.
- Battle of Kiev (1918) (February 1918) – Red Guard formations from Petrograd and Moscow stormed and took Kiev.
- Battle of Kruty (29 or 30 January 1918) – Ukrainian cadets and army units delayed the Bolshevik advance on Kiev at Kruty station.
- Battle of Motovilivka (18 November 1918) – Directorate forces defeated the Ukrainian State's army.
- Battle of Peregonovka (26 September 1919) – Makhno's Insurgent Army turned after a long retreat and routed the Volunteer Army.
- Battle of Zhmerynka (December 1917 – March 1918) – Fight for the Zhmerynka junction between Ukrainian, Austro-Hungarian and Red forces.
- Proskuriv offensive (1 June – 16 July 1919) – UNR army operation that took much of western Podolia from Bolshevik forces.
- Soviet occupation of Kharkiv (19 December 1917 – 10 January 1918) – First episode of the Ukrainian–Soviet War, in which Red Guards seized Kharkiv and installed Soviet power.
- Soviet occupation of Poltava (19–20 January 1918) – Bolshevik troops took the railway junction city of Poltava.

==== Uprisings ====
- Anti-Hetman Uprising (14 November – 15 December 1918) – Rising and brief civil war that overthrew Skoropadsky's Ukrainian State.
- Bolshevik–Makhnovist conflict (9 January – 2 October 1920; 26 November 1920 – 28 August 1921) – Fighting between Soviet forces and the Makhnovshchina for control of southern Ukraine.
- Chornyy Lis Republic (1919–1922) – Short-lived insurgent territory in central Ukraine.
- Ekaterinoslav Bolshevik uprising (9–11 January 1918) – Bolshevik-led rising in Ekaterinoslav, later backed by Red Guards from Russia.
- Hryhoriv Uprising (7 May – 27 July 1919) – Otaman Hryhoriv led his peasant partisans in revolt against Bolshevik rule in Ukraine.
- Kholodny Yar Republic (1919–1922) – Self-proclaimed partisan state near Chyhyryn loyal to the Ukrainian People's Republic.
- Khotyn Uprising (7 January – 1 February 1919) – Ukrainian-led insurrection in far-northern Bessarabia against Romanian rule.
- Kiev Arsenal January Uprising (29 January – 4 February 1918) – Bolshevik-organized workers' revolt at the Arsenal factory in Kiev, put down by Ukrainian forces.
- Medvyn rebellion (1919–1922) – Anti-Bolshevik rising of villagers around Medvyn in the Boguslav region.
- Odessa Bolshevik uprising (27–30 January 1918) – Workers and sailors rose in Odessa, supported by Red Guards arriving from Soviet Russia.
- Trypillian Incident (28 June – 25 July 1919) – Clash between Ukrainian anti-Bolshevik insurgents and the Bolshevik Kiev garrison.
- Yampil-Babchyntsi rebellion (3–10 February 1921) – Peasant rising under the slogan "For Soviet power without communists".

=== Caucasus, Transcaspia and Central Asia ===
==== Campaigns ====
- Dagestan Campaign (1918) (1 August – 20 September 1918) – Ottoman troops occupied Derbent and Port-Petrovsk after their victory at Baku.
- Kolesov's Campaign (March 1918) – Failed Bolshevik and Young Bukharan attempt to take power in the Emirate of Bukhara.

==== Battles and operations ====
- Abkhazia operation (11 May – 11 June 1918) – Georgian forces drove local Bolshevik units out of Abkhazia.
- Battle of Gagra (1919) (16–19 April 1919) – Georgian troops defeated the White Army at Gagra.
- Battle of Yalama (28 April 1920) – Azerbaijani garrison troops fought the invading 11th Army at Yalama.
- Battles for Dushanbe (1922) (December 1921 – 4 August 1922) – Repeated fighting for the Tajik capital Dushanbe, ending when Enver Pasha was killed.
- Bukhara operation (1920) (28 August – 2 September 1920) – Red Army forces and Young Bukharans defeated the Emirate of Bukhara.
- Siege of Dushanbe (8–14 February 1922) – Basmachi fighters under Enver Pasha took Dushanbe from its Soviet garrison.
- Siege of Petro-Aleksandrovsk (1918) (24 November – 5 December 1918) – Junaid Khan's Khivan troops failed to take the Bolshevik-held town.
- Sochi conflict (29 June 1918 – 24 May 1919) – Whites, Reds and Georgia fought for control of the Black Sea town of Sochi.
- Soviet intervention in Mongolia (1 May – 31 August 1921) – Soviet troops removed Baron Ungern's White government and occupied Mongolia.
- Soviet invasion of Armenia (29 November – 4 December 1920) – 11th Army installed a Soviet government in the First Republic of Armenia amid Kemalist attacks.
- Red Army invasion of Azerbaijan (27 April – 12 May 1920) – 11th Army overthrew the Azerbaijan Democratic Republic and installed a Soviet government.
- Soviet invasion of Georgia (12 February – 17 March 1921) – Red Army campaign that overthrew the Menshevik government of the Democratic Republic of Georgia.

==== Uprisings ====
- Abkhazia conflict (1918) (16 February – September 1918) – Bolshevik risings and an Ottoman landing in Abkhazia, both defeated by Georgian forces.
- Basmachi movement (1916–1934) – Muslim insurgency across Central Asia against Imperial Russian and later Soviet rule.
- Bukharan Revolution (1917–1925) – Overthrow of the Emirate of Bukhara and creation of the Bukharan People's Soviet Republic.
- Dagestan uprising (September 1920 – 15 March 1921) – Mountaineer revolt led by the Naqshbandi brotherhood against Bolshevik rule in Dagestan.
- Enver Pasha's Rebellion (November 1921 – 4 August 1922) – The former Ottoman war minister led Basmachi forces against Soviet rule until his death.
- February Uprising (February–April 1921) – Anti-Bolshevik revolt by the Armenian Revolutionary Federation, put down in early April.
- Georgian–Ossetian conflict (1918–1920) – Ossetian uprisings against Georgian rule in what is now South Ossetia.
- Khivan Revolution (1917–1924) – Overthrow of the Khanate of Khiva and creation of the Khorezm People's Soviet Republic.
- Mughan clashes (March 1918 – August 1919) – Whites, Bolsheviks and Azerbaijani forces fought over the Mughan steppe.
- Rebellion in Tskhinvali (19–22 March 1918) – Failed Ossetian rising against the Georgian republic at Tskhinvali.

== Foreign military operations: the Allied intervention ==
=== Foreign military groups ===
- American Expeditionary Force, Siberia – the United States force at Vladivostok under Graves.
- Czechoslovak Legion – Czech and Slovak volunteers whose revolt opened the eastern front.
- Dunsterforce – Allied officers and NCOs sent to northern Persia and the South Caucasus.
- Malleson mission – British Indian troops in Transcaspia.
- West Russian Volunteer Army – Bermondt-Avalov's pro-German White Russian force in Latvia and Lithuania.

=== Theater-level campaigns and expeditionary forces ===
- Allied intervention in the Russian Civil War (4 March 1918 – 15 May 1925) – Multi-national expeditions sent to secure Allied supplies, then to back the Whites against the Bolsheviks.
- British campaign in the Baltic (1918–1919) (28 November 1918 – 4 November 1919) – Royal Navy campaign, codenamed Operation Red Trek, aimed at containing Bolshevik expansion and supporting Estonia and Latvia.
- Canadian Siberian Expeditionary Force (August 1918 – June 1919) – Canadian force of 4,192 men sent to Vladivostok to bolster the Allied presence and oppose the Bolsheviks.
- Dunsterforce (formed December 1917; in action to September 1918) – Fewer than 350 Allied officers and NCOs sent through Persia to the South Caucasus under Lionel Dunsterville.
- Far Eastern Front in the Russian Civil War (1917–1923) – Fighting between Soviet Russia and the remnants of the Russian State across eastern Siberia, Mongolia and Outer Manchuria.
- Japanese intervention in Siberia (1918–1922) – Japanese invasion of the Russian Maritime Provinces in support of the White forces.
- Japanese occupation of northern Sakhalin (21 April 1920 – 15 May 1925) – Japan held northern Sakhalin following the Nikolayevsk incident.
- Malleson mission (11 August 1918 – 5 April 1919) – Small force of British Indian troops under Wilfrid Malleson acting against the Bolsheviks in Transcaspia.
- North Russia intervention (4 March 1918 – 12 October 1919) – Foreign troops brought into the war on the side of the Whites, around Archangel and Murmansk.
- Polar Bear Expedition (United States) – the United States contingent of about 5,000 troops landed at Archangel.
- Siberian intervention (August 1918 – July 1920; Japanese withdrawal October 1922) – Entente troops sent to the Maritime Provinces to support the Whites against Soviet Russia.
- Southern Russia intervention (18 December 1918 – 30 April 1919) – French-led landings on the Black Sea coast of present-day Ukraine on the side of the Whites; the force withdrew in April 1919.

=== North Russia ===
==== Battles and operations ====
- Battle of Bolshie Ozerki (31 March – 2 April 1919) – British, American, Polish and White Russian troops repelled Red partisan regiments at Bolshie Ozerki.
- Battle of Shenkursk (19–25 January 1919) – Red Army offensive that forced the Allied garrison to retreat from Shenkursk on the Vaga.
- Battle of Tulgas (11–14 November 1918) – Allied and Bolshevik troops fought on the Northern Dvina on Armistice Day.
- Battle of Ust-Padenga (19 January 1919) – American outpost overrun; the defenders fell back toward Shenkursk.
- Battle of Vystavka (27 January – early March 1919) – Allied defense of Vystavka and neighboring villages against repeated Red Army attacks.
- Vaga River front – Front where the Red Army and Allied forces met along the Vaga.

=== Siberia and the Far East ===
==== Campaigns ====
- Suchan Valley Campaign (July – August 1919) – American clearing and occupation of the mining region around Suchan.

==== Battles and operations ====
- Battle of Bogdat (25 September – 19 October 1919) – Reckoned the largest clash in Transbaikal between Soviet partisans and White and Japanese forces.
- Battle of Novo Litovoskaya (7 August 1919) – Two small patrols ran into each other in the town; the Red patrol was overrun.
- Battle of Posolskeya (10 January 1920) – Last engagement of the intervention to involve American forces, after Cossacks surprised US troops.
- Battle of Romanovka (25 June 1919) – Bolshevik partisans under Tryapitsyn made a surprise attack on an American camp near Vladivostok.
- Chita Operations (10 April – 31 October 1920) – Far Eastern Republic operations against the White position at Chita in eastern Transbaikal.
- Evgenevka incident (August 1919) – Armed standoff between the American 27th Infantry Regiment and Japanese troops in Siberia.
- Nikolayevsk incident (12 March – 3 June 1920) – Killing of thousands of people at Nikolayevsk-on-Amur by forces under Yakov Tryapitsyn, followed by the destruction of the town.

=== South Russia, Black Sea and the Baltic ===
==== Campaigns ====
- Romanian military intervention in Bessarabia (19 January – 8 March 1918) – Romanian and other anti-Bolshevik forces took Bessarabia from Bolshevik control; Bessarabia was joined to Romania later that year.

==== Battles and operations ====
- Action of 3 May 1920 (3 May 1920) – Short single-ship action between the French Navy and Soviet Russia.
- Action of 9 January 1921 (9 January 1921) – Short naval battle between the French Navy and Soviet Russia.
- Raid on Kronstadt (18 August 1919) – Royal Navy motor boats and RAF aircraft attacked the Baltic Fleet at its home base.

==== Uprisings ====
- Bender Uprising (27 May 1919) – Rising organized by local Bolshevik groups at Bender against Romanian control of Bessarabia.
- Black Sea mutiny (16–19 April 1919) – Mutiny aboard French Navy ships sent to the Black Sea, against the policy of intervention.

=== Transcaucasia, Transcaspia and Persia ===
==== Battles and operations ====
- 1920 Royal Navy mission to Enzeli (1920) – Party of thirty-one Royal Navy officers and men sent to Enzeli in north Persia to take charge of interned White ships, later detained in Baku.
- Anzali Operation (18 May 1920) – Naval and amphibious action by the Soviet Caspian Flotilla against White and British forces at Anzali.
- Battle of Alexandrovsky Fort (20–21 May 1919) – Naval battle in the Caspian at the base of Fort Alexandrovsky.
- Battle of Baku (26 August – 14 September 1918) – Ottoman and Azerbaijani forces under Nuri Pasha took Baku from Bolshevik and Armenian forces, then from British, Armenian and White Russian troops under Dunsterville.
- Battle of Dushak (October 1918) – British Indian troops under Malleson engaged the Red Army near Dushak.

=== Finnish expeditions on Russian soil ===
==== Battles and operations ====
- Aunus expedition (21 April – 18 September 1919) – Finnish volunteers attempted to occupy part of East Karelia.
- Petsamo expeditions (May 1918; April 1920) – Two expeditions by Finnish civilian volunteers to annex Petsamo from Soviet Russia.
- Viena expedition (21 March – 2 October 1918) – Finnish volunteers attempted to annex White Karelia from Russia; the attempt failed.

== Border state wars ==
=== Baltic states ===
==== Campaigns ====
- Estonian War of Independence (28 November 1918 – 2 February 1920) – Campaign of the Estonian army and its allies against the Soviet westward offensive and the Landeswehr.
- Latvian War of Independence (5 December 1918 – 11 August 1920) – Fighting in Latvia between the newly proclaimed republic and Soviet Russia, ended by the Riga peace treaty.
- Lithuanian Wars of Independence (December 1918 – November 1920) – The three wars Lithuania fought for its independence: against Bolshevik forces, the Bermontians and Poland.
- Lithuanian–Bermontian War (July–December 1919) – Lithuania against the West Russian Volunteer Army.
- Lithuanian–Soviet War (12 December 1918 – 31 August 1919) – Newly independent Lithuania against Soviet Russia.

==== Battles and operations ====
- Battle of Cēsis (1919) (19–23 June 1919) – An Estonian force with Latvian units repelled Baltic German attacks near Cēsis.
- Battle of Jelgava (1919) (15–21 November 1919) – Latvian army operation against the West Russian Volunteer Army at Jelgava.
- Battle of Jieznas (10–13 February 1919) – One of the first battles of the recreated Lithuanian army against the Red Army.
- Battle of Narva (1918) (28 November 1918) – Troops of the Estonian provisional government met the Russian Red Army at Narva.
- Battle of Paju (31 January 1919) – The Tartu–Valga group of the Estonian army pushed the Red Latvian Riflemen out of Paju manor near Valga.
- Battle of Radviliškis (21–22 November 1919) – Lithuanian army action against the West Russian Volunteer Army near Radviliškis.
- Battle of Riga (1919) (22–23 May 1919) – Von der Goltz's German troops took Riga from Soviet Latvia.
- Battle of Vilnius (January 1919) (31 December 1918 – 5 January 1919) – Pro-Polish self-defence units fought German and Bolshevik forces for Vilnius.

=== Finland ===
==== Campaigns ====
- Finnish Civil War (27 January – 15 May 1918) – War for the control of newly independent Finland between White Finland and the Finnish Socialist Workers' Republic (Red Finland).
- Heimosodat (21 March 1918 – 21 March 1922) – Expeditions in which Finnish volunteers tried to bring areas of related Finnic peoples under Finnish control or help them break from Soviet Russia.
- Invasion of Åland (15 February – September 1918) – Swedish and then German troops landed on Åland, still held by Soviet Russian troops.

==== Battles and operations ====
- Battle of Hämeenlinna (26 April 1918) – German troops and Finnish Whites captured Hämeenlinna.
- Battle of Helsinki (12–13 April 1918) – German troops and Finnish Whites took Helsinki from the Reds.
- Battle of Lahti (19 April – 1 May 1918) – German troops and Finnish Whites seized Lahti, cutting off the Red retreat eastward.
- Battle of Rautu (21 February – 5 April 1918) – Long fight at the Rautu railway station between the Finnish Whites and the Reds, who were supported by Russian Bolsheviks.
- Battle of Syrjäntaka (28–29 April 1918) – The German Baltic Sea Division met the Red Guards at Syrjäntaka in Tuulos.

=== Poland, Ukraine and Belarus ===
==== Campaigns ====
- Belarusian-Soviet conflict (December 1917 – 1918) – Political and military confrontation between units supporting the Belarusian Rada and the Bolshevik Red Guards.
- Kiev offensive (1920) (25 April – July 1920) – Polish and allied Ukrainian advance into present-day Ukraine that briefly took Kiev.
- Polish–Lithuanian War (May 1919 – 29 November 1920) – Undeclared war between Lithuania and Poland, fought mainly in the Vilnius and Suwałki regions.
- Polish–Soviet War (14 February 1919 – 18 March 1921) – Poland against Soviet Russia in the aftermath of the First World War and the Russian Revolution.
- Polish–Ukrainian War (1 November 1918 – 18 July 1919) – Poland against the Ukrainian forces of the West Ukrainian People's Republic and the Ukrainian People's Republic.
- Vilna offensive (April 1919) – Polish attack that cleared the Red Army out of Vilna after street fighting.

==== Battles and operations ====
- Battle of Bereza Kartuska (14 February 1919; 21–26 July 1920) – Polish and Soviet forces clashed twice around Bereza Kartuska; the 1919 clash is sometimes counted as the war's first engagement.
- Battle of Bobruysk (1918) (2 February – 11 March 1918) – Polish I Corps under Dowbor-Muśnicki fought the Red Army for Bobruysk.
- Battle of Daugavpils (3–5 January 1920) – Joint Polish and Latvian attack on the Red Army garrison of Daugavpils.
- Battle of Lemberg (1918) (1 November 1918 – 22 May 1919) – The West Ukrainian People's Republic and Polish forces in Lviv contested the city and eastern Galicia; the Polish army joined later.
- Battle of Lwów (1920) (July–September 1920) – Red Army attack on Lwów under Yegorov, held off by Polish and Ukrainian divisions.
- Battle of Sejny (2–23 September 1920) – Polish and Lithuanian troops clashed in the Suwałki Region.
- Battle of the Niemen River (15–25 September 1920) – Second-largest battle of the Polish–Soviet War, fought near the Niemen.
- Battle of Warsaw (1920) (12–25 August 1920) – Series of battles outside Warsaw that ended in a Polish victory and broke the Red Army advance.
- Chortkiv offensive (7–28 June 1919) – Ukrainian Galician Army counteroffensive that made early gains but failed for want of ammunition.
- Żeligowski's Mutiny (8 October – 29 November 1920) – Polish operation, staged as a mutiny by Żeligowski, that secured Vilnius for Poland and set up the Republic of Central Lithuania.

==== Uprisings ====
- November Uprising (Lviv, 1918) (1 November 1918) – Ukrainian rising that took Lemberg and claimed the city for a Ukrainian state.

=== Transcaucasia and Central Asia ===
==== Campaigns ====
- Armenian–Azerbaijani war (1918–1920) (30 March 1918 – 28 November 1920) – Conflict in the South Caucasus in regions of mixed Armenian and Azerbaijani population.
- Turkish invasion of Armenia (24 September – 2 December 1920) – The First Republic of Armenia against the Turkish National Movement, after the Treaty of Sèvres.
- Turkish invasion of Georgia (23 February – 20 March 1921) – Turkish nationalist advance into the Democratic Republic of Georgia from the east, alongside the Soviet move on the country.

==== Battles and operations ====
- Battle of Binagadi (26–31 August 1918) – Ottoman and Azerbaijani forces under Nuri Pasha fought British, Armenian and White Russian forces under Dunsterville; part of the Battle of Baku.
- Battle of Goychay (27 June – 1 July 1918) – Clashes between Ottoman and Azerbaijani forces and the Soviet 11th Army with Armenian Dashnak units, which ended Soviet and Armenian control around Goychay.
- Battle of Kurdamir (7–10 July 1918) – Ottoman and Azerbaijani troops fought the forces of the Baku Council of People's Commissars for Kurdamir.
- Battle of Nakhchivan (mid-June 1919) – Action of the Aras War at Nakhchivan, between the First Republic of Armenia and the Republic of Aras.
- Lankaran operation (August 1919) – Azerbaijani operation that took Lankaran and the south of the country.
- Zangezur Expedition (3–9 November 1919) – Azerbaijani incursion from Karabakh into Zangezur, a region contested with Armenia.

==== Uprisings ====
- Muslim uprisings in Kars and Sharur–Nakhichevan (1 July 1919 – 28 July 1920) – Insurgencies by local Muslims against the administration of the First Republic of Armenia in Kars and Sharur–Nakhchivan.
- Basmachi movement – rising against Imperial Russian and Soviet rule in Central Asia, 1916–1934.
- Chapan rebellion – rising of Simbirsk and Samara peasants against requisitioning and conscription, March 1919.
- Pitchfork Uprising – peasant rising against war communism in eastern Tatarstan and western Bashkortostan, February 1920.
- Tambov Rebellion – among the largest and best-organized peasant risings against the Bolshevik government, 1920–1922.
- West Siberian rebellion – the largest peasant rising against the new Bolshevik state, 1921–1922.

== Non-military events ==
=== Famines ===
- 1921–1922 famine in Tatarstan – Drought and mass starvation in the Tatar ASSR. Between 500,000 and 2,000,000 peasants died.
- 1921–1923 famine in Ukraine – Famine in the southern steppe of Ukraine. The dead are put at 200,000–1,000,000, though no systematic records were kept.
- Kazakh famine of 1919–1922 – Drought and mass starvation in the Kirghiz and Turkestan ASSRs, part of the wider Russian famine. 400,000–750,000 died.
- Prodrazverstka – Confiscation of grain and other produce from peasants at fixed prices against set quotas. Introduced across Soviet Russia in January 1919 and replaced by a food tax in March 1921.
- Russian famine of 1921–1922 – Famine in the Volga and Ural regions of Soviet Russia, brought on by drought and the failures of war communism. About 5 million people died.

=== Terror, famine, and repression ===
- Anti-religious campaign during the Russian Civil War (1917–1921) – Bolshevik campaign against the Russian Orthodox Church. Its assets were seized and antireligious legislation removed its capacity to function.
- Cheka – The first Soviet secret police, set up in December 1917 under Felix Dzerzhinsky. It was the main instrument of the Red Terror; its internal-defense troops numbered at least 200,000 by 1921.
- De-Cossackization (from January 1919) – Bolshevik policy of repression intended to end the Cossacks as a distinct group, directed above all at the Don and Kuban hosts.
- Lenin's hanging order (11 August 1918) – Lenin's telegram to Penza ordering that no fewer than 100 kulaks be hanged in public. It was not carried out as such, and the name comes from the US Library of Congress.
- Red Terror (September 1918 – 1922) – Bolshevik campaign of political repression and execution, carried out mainly by the Cheka. Estimates of executions run from 50,000 to 200,000, and a further 400,000 deaths are attributed to prisons and to the suppression of local revolts.
  - Outline of the Red Terror (Russia)
- Tagantsev conspiracy (1921) – Largely fabricated monarchist plot in Petrograd. More than 800 people were arrested and 98 shot, among them the poet Nikolay Gumilev.
- White Terror (Russia) (1917–1923) – Violence and mass killing by the White armies and governments. Death tolls given vary from 20,000 to more than 500,000, excluding pogroms.

==== Famine ====
- Russian famine of 1921–1922 - also known as the Povolzhye famine (Russian: Голод в Поволжье, lit. 'Volga region famine'), was a period of human induced mass starvation, exacerbated by drought, in the Russian Soviet Federative Socialist Republic that began early in the spring of 1921 and lasted until 1922. The famine killed an estimated five million people and primarily affected the Volga and Ural River regions.
- Kazakh famine of 1919–1922 - also referred to as the Turkestan famine of 1919–1922 was a period of human induced mass starvation, exacerbated by drought, that took place in the Kirghiz Autonomous Socialist Soviet Republic (1920–25) (in present-day Kazakhstan) and Turkestan Autonomous Soviet Socialist Republic in which 400,000 to 750,000 peasants died.
- 1921–1922 famine in Tatarstan - was a period of human induced mass starvation, exacerbated by drought, that took place in the Tatar Autonomous Soviet Socialist Republic in which between 500,000 to 2,000,000 peasants died.
- 1921–1923 famine in Ukraine - was a period of human induced mass starvation, exacerbated by drought, that took place in the southern steppe region of Ukraine in which between 200,000 and 1,000,000 peasants died.
- Pomgol - the name of two organizations created in the Russian SFSR during the Russian famine of 1921.
- Prodrazverstka - policy of coercive food confiscation and redistribution in the early Soviet Union.

==== Pogroms ====
- Fastov massacre (23–26 September 1919) – Volunteer Army troops, mainly Terek Cossacks, killed Jews at Fastov over four days. Figures for the dead vary from 1,000 to 1,500.
- Kiev pogroms (1919) – Pogroms in and around Kiev by White Volunteer Army troops and other anti-Bolshevik forces.
- Pogroms during the Russian Civil War (1918–1920) – Some 1,500 pogroms in more than 1,300 localities, mostly in Ukraine, with 35,000–250,000 dead.
- Proskurov pogrom (15 February 1919) – Ukrainian People's Republic soldiers under Ivan Semesenko killed at least 1,500 Jews at Proskurov in about three and a half hours; other estimates give up to 1,700.

=== Massacres ===
- Agulis massacre (24–25 December 1919) – Azerbaijani authorities and local irregulars destroyed Agulis and killed much of its Armenian population. Armenian government figures give up to 400 dead in Lower Agulis and up to 1,000 in Upper Agulis.
- Eichenfeld massacre (8 November 1919) – Makhnovist insurgents killed 75 Mennonite colonists at Eichenfeld and 61 more nearby, in reprisals against settlers seen as having backed the Central Powers and the Whites.
- Khaibalikend massacre (5–7 June 1919) – Azerbaijani soldiers and irregulars killed 600–700 Armenian civilians in four villages near Shusha.
- March Days (30 March – 2 April 1918) – Inter-ethnic fighting in Baku, set off by the disarming of a ship's Muslim crew, in which Bolshevik and Dashnak forces killed Musavat fighters and Muslim civilians. Estimates of Azerbaijani and other Muslim dead range from about 3,000 to 12,000; one estimate gives over 10,000 Azerbaijanis killed and nearly 2,500 Armenians.
- Massacres of Azerbaijanis in Armenia (1917–1921) – Killings and expulsions of the Muslim population of Armenia, including the destruction of Azerbaijani settlements in Zangezur, during the mutual Armenian–Azerbaijani massacres of these years. The total killed is unknown.
- Murder of the Romanov family (16–17 July 1918) – Bolsheviks under Yakov Yurovsky shot and stabbed Nicholas II, his wife and their five children at Yekaterinburg, on the orders of the Ural Regional Soviet.
- Nikolayevsk incident (12 March – 3 June 1920) – Red partisans under Yakov Tryapitsyn killed thousands of civilians and prisoners at Nikolayevsk-on-Amur. Official documents and the trial verdicts put the dead at about half the town's population, most of them Russians.
- September Days (September 1918) – The Ottoman Army of Islam and its Azerbaijani allies killed Armenians in Baku after taking the city. Most estimates give about 10,000 dead, some as many as 30,000.
- Shamkhor massacre (22–25 January 1918) – Azerbaijani armed groups attacked Russian soldiers returning from the Caucasus front near Shamkhor to take their weapons. Figures run from several hundred to over 2,000 dead, and the higher ones are disputed.
- Shusha massacre (22–26 March 1920) – Azerbaijani troops and militia killed Armenians in Shusha and burned the Armenian quarter. Estimates of the dead run from several hundred to 20,000.

== Military forces ==
=== Red forces ===
- Red Army (formed January 1918) – the army of the Bolshevik government, organized by Leon Trotsky as War Commissar.
  - 1st Cavalry Army – Budyonny's cavalry army, formed in November 1919.
  - Baltic Fleet – the navy's Baltic Sea fleet; its sailors were early supporters of the regime and later rebelled at Kronstadt.
  - Latvian Riflemen – infantry raised in 1915 for the Imperial Russian Army, later the government's shock troops and guard.
  - Red Guards – Bolshevik volunteer detachments from which the Red Army grew.

=== White forces ===
- White Army – a collective name for the armed forces of the White movement.
  - Armed Forces of South Russia (formed January 1919; disbanded April 1920) – the unified White forces in southern Russia.
    - Army of Wrangel (formed March 1920; disbanded November 1920) – Wrangel's command, officially titled the Russian Army.
    - People's Army of Komuch (formed June 1918; disbanded October 1918) – anti-Bolshevik army in the Volga region.
    - Volunteer Army (formed December 1917; merged March 1920) – also known as the Southern White Army.
  - Don Army (formed April 1918; disbanded March 1920) – the army of the Don Republic, based at Novocherkassk.
  - Far Eastern Army (formed February 1920; disbanded September 1921) – Cossack and White units in the Far East, formed by Semyonov.
  - Kuban Cossacks – Cossack host of the Kuban region.
  - Northern Army (formed November 1918; disbanded February 1920) – White army on the Northern Front.
  - Northwestern Army (formed June 1919; disbanded January 1920) – White army in Estonia and Latvia, commanded by Yudenich.
  - Orenburg Cossacks – Cossack host of Orenburg Governorate under Dutov.
  - Siberian Army (formed June 1918; reorganized July 1919) – anti-Bolshevik army in Siberia and the Urals.
  - West Russian Volunteer Army (formed November 1918; disbanded December 1919) – pro-German White formation in Latvia and Lithuania, also known as the Bermontians after its commander, Pavel Bermondt-Avalov.
  - Zemskaya Rat – Diterikhs's command in Primorye, the last White army in the field.

=== Green and insurgent forces ===
- Green armies (active 1918–1922) – armed peasant groups that fought the Bolsheviks, the Whites and the foreign interventionists alike.
- Revolutionary Insurgent Army of Ukraine (active 1918–1921), also known as the Makhnovtsi (Ukrainian: Махновці) – an anarchist army of Ukrainian peasants and workers led by Nestor Makhno.

=== Foreign forces ===
- American Expeditionary Force, North Russia (formed September 1918; withdrawn August 1919) – United States Army contingent of about 5,000 men, known as the Polar Bear Expedition, which fought the Red Army around Arkhangelsk.
- American Expeditionary Force, Siberia (formed August 1918; withdrawn April 1920) – United States Army force at Vladivostok.
- Baltische Landeswehr (formed December 1918; disbanded July 1919) – the armed forces of the nobility of Courland and Livonia.
- Canadian Siberian Expeditionary Force (formed August 1918; disbanded June 1919) – Canadian force sent to Vladivostok.
- Czechoslovak Legion (formed 1914; disbanded 1920) – volunteer force of Czechs and Slovaks that fought for the Allies in the First World War and with the Whites in Russia.
- Dunsterforce (formed December 1917; disbanded September 1918) – fewer than 350 Allied officers and NCOs sent through Persia to the South Caucasus under Lionel Dunsterville.
- Legione Redenta (raised 1918; withdrawn November 1919) – Italian force of 2,500 prisoners of war taken from the Austro-Hungarian Army, which joined the Siberian intervention.
- Malleson mission (11 August 1918 – 5 April 1919) – small force of British Indian troops under Wilfrid Malleson acting against the Bolsheviks in Transcaspia.
- Polish 5th Siberian Rifle Division (formed July 1918; surrendered January 1920) – Polish unit in Siberia that fought alongside White forces.

== Organizations ==
- Russian Provisional Government – the government of Russia between the February and October revolutions of 1917.
- Russian Constituent Assembly – assembly elected in November 1917 and dissolved in January 1918.

=== Red organizations ===
- Bolsheviks – faction of the Russian Social Democratic Labour Party and ruling party of Soviet Russia.
- Council of People's Commissars – the government of the Russian SFSR, 1917–1946.
- All-Russian Central Executive Committee – supreme governing body of the Russian SFSR, 1917–1937.
- Petrograd Soviet – council of workers' and soldiers' deputies, 1917–1924.
- Cheka – the first Soviet secret police, 1917–1922.
- Revolutionary tribunals – Soviet courts for counter-revolutionary offences, established in 1917.
- Revolutionary committees (revkomy) – provisional Soviet administrations in territories taken by the Red Army, 1918–1920.
- Siberian Revolutionary Committee – the Sibrevkom, which governed Siberia from 1919 to 1925.
- All-Ukrainian Revolutionary Committee – supreme Soviet body in Ukraine, December 1919 to February 1920.
- Committees of Poor Peasants – the kombedy, village bodies for grain requisitioning, from 1918.
- Military Opposition – Bolshevik faction of 1918–1919 opposed to Trotsky's use of former Tsarist officers.
- Pomgol – Soviet organizations for relief of the starving, 1921.
- Posledgol – successor commission, for the after-effects of the famine.

=== White organizations ===
- Committee of Members of the Constituent Assembly – the Komuch, anti-Bolshevik government at Samara from June 1918.
- West Siberian Commissariat – Socialist Revolutionary (SR) government in western Siberia, May to June 1918.
- Provisional Siberian Government (Omsk) – its successor at Omsk, June to November 1918.
- Provisional Siberian Government (Vladivostok) – rival Siberian government at Vladivostok, 1918.
- Provisional Regional Government of the Urals – government at Yekaterinburg, August to October 1918.
- Provisional All-Russian Government – the Ufa Directory, September to November 1918.
- Russian Government – Kolchak's government at Omsk, November 1918 to January 1920.
- Supreme Administration of the Northern Region – government at Arkhangelsk, August to September 1918.
- Provisional Government of the Northern Region – its successor at Arkhangelsk, 1918–1920.
- Regional Government of Northwest Russia – government behind the Northern Corps and the 1919 advance on Petrograd.
- Provisional Priamurye Government – the last White-held enclave, in the Russian Far East, 1921–1923.
- Eastern Okraina – Semyonov's government at Chita, 1920.
- Kuban Rada – assembly of the Kuban Cossacks, which proclaimed the Kuban People's Republic in 1918.
- Union for the Defense of the Motherland and Freedom – Savinkov's anti-Bolshevik underground, founded March 1918.
- Russian All-Military Union – White veterans' organization founded in exile in 1924.
- Russian Imperial Union-Order – Russian monarchist organization associated with the White movement.

=== Green organizations ===
- Makhnovshchina – anarchist movement in southern Ukraine led by Nestor Makhno.
- Regional Congress of Peasants, Workers and Insurgents – the Makhnovshchina's highest deliberative body.
- Free soviets – the Makhnovist form of local self-government.
- Nabat – Confederation of Anarchist Organizations of Ukraine, 1918–1920.

=== Other organizations ===
==== Menshevik organizations ====
- Mensheviks – moderate faction of the Russian Social Democratic Labour Party, separate from the Bolsheviks since 1903.
- Russian Social Democratic Labour Party (Mensheviks) – the Menshevik party, later renamed the Russian Social Democratic Labour Party (United).
- Menshevik-Internationalists – anti-war left wing of the Mensheviks, led by Julius Martov.
- Social Democratic Party of Georgia – the Georgian Mensheviks, governing party of the Democratic Republic of Georgia.

==== Socialist Revolutionary organizations ====
- Socialist Revolutionary Party – agrarian socialist party, 1902–1921.
- Left Socialist-Revolutionaries – SR breakaway allied to the Bolsheviks until July 1918.
- Ukrainian Socialist-Revolutionary Party – the Ukrainian SRs, founded in 1917.
- Borotbists – left-nationalist party in Ukraine, 1918–1920.
- Borbysts – the Ukrainian Party of Left Socialist Revolutionaries.

==== Miscellaneous organizations ====
- General Jewish Labour Bund – Jewish socialist party, 1897–1921.
- Yedinstvo – Plekhanov's social-democratic group, 1917–1918.
- Soviet anarchism – anarchists who backed the Soviet state against the Whites.
- Central Committee of the Black Sea Fleet – the Black Sea Tsentroflot, 1917–1918.
- Security Council of the Northern Caucasus and Dagestan – Dagestani government resisting the Whites, 1919–1920.
- Karakorum Government – republic in the Altai, 1918–1922.
- Pro-independence movements in the Russian Civil War – national movements seeking statehood after the collapse of the empire.
- Atamanshchina – rule by local warlords, or atamans, in Ukraine and parts of Russia.
- American Relief Administration – American relief mission directed by Herbert Hoover, in Russia 1921–1923.
- Hands Off Russia (1919–1924) – campaign launched by British socialists against Allied intervention; in May 1920 East London dockers refused to load arms for Poland aboard the Jolly George.
- Smenovekhovtsy – émigré movement urging reconciliation with Soviet power, from 1921.

== People ==
- Nicholas II (1868–1918) – the last emperor of Russia, murdered with his family at Yekaterinburg in July 1918.
- Maxim Gorky (1868–1936) – Russian and Soviet writer, active in relief work during the famine of 1921–1922.
- Fanny Kaplan (1890–1918) – Socialist Revolutionary who attempted to assassinate Lenin in August 1918, and was executed by the Cheka.
- John Reed (1887–1920) – American journalist and communist activist who reported the October Revolution.
- Larissa Reissner (1895–1926) – Russian writer and revolutionary who held leadership roles on the Bolshevik side in the war.
- Viktor Shklovsky (1893–1984) – Russian writer and literary theorist, involved in a Socialist Revolutionary plot against the Bolsheviks and later a Red Army soldier.
- Alexandra Feodorovna (1872–1918) – the last empress of Russia, consort of Nicholas II, murdered with him at Yekaterinburg.
- Grand Duke Michael Alexandrovich (1878–1918) – youngest brother of Nicholas II, proclaimed emperor in 1917 but declined to take power.
- Eugene Botkin (1865–1918) – court physician to Nicholas II and Alexandra from 1908, killed with the family.
- Patriarch Tikhon (1865–1925) – Patriarch of Moscow and All Russia from 1917 until his death.
- Benjamin of Petrograd (1873–1922) – Metropolitan of Petrograd and Gdov, 1917–1922, executed after a show trial.
- Andrei Shingarev (1869–1918) – physician, Duma deputy and a leader of the Kadets, murdered in January 1918.
- Nikolai Gumilev (1886–1921) – Russian poet, co-founder of the Acmeist movement, executed by the Cheka in 1921.
- Yekaterina Kuskova (1869–1958) – economist and journalist who opposed the Bolsheviks.
- Tatiana Solomakha (1892–1918) – Bolshevik of Cossack origin, killed by White forces in the Kuban, a victim of the White Terror.
- Ferdynand Ossendowski (1876–1945) – Polish writer and explorer who took part in the war and wrote about it.
- Roman Gul (1896–1986) – Russian émigré writer, critical of the White movement.
- Ivan Bunin (1870–1953) – Russian writer who left Odessa for exile in 1920; the first Russian Nobel laureate in literature.
- Clayton Kratz (1896 – presumed 1920) – American Mennonite relief worker who disappeared at Molotschna in 1920.

=== Political leaders ===
==== Red leaders ====
- Vladimir Lenin (1870–1924) – founder of the Bolsheviks and head of the Soviet government from 1917.
- Leon Trotsky (1879–1940) – war commissar who built the Red Army and led it to victory in the war.
- Joseph Stalin (1878–1953) – Bolshevik leader, later general secretary of the party.
- Yakov Sverdlov (1885–1919) – chairman of the All-Russian Central Executive Committee and of the party secretariat until his death in 1919.
- Grigory Zinoviev (1883–1936) – Bolshevik leader, chairman of the Petrograd Soviet from 1917 and of the Communist International from 1919.
- Lev Kamenev (1883–1936) – Old Bolshevik and chairman of the Moscow Soviet from 1918.
- Nikolai Bukharin (1888–1938) – Bolshevik politician and Marxist theorist, editor of Pravda from 1918.
- Georgy Chicherin (1872–1936) – People's Commissar for Foreign Affairs, 1918–1930.
- Anatoly Lunacharsky (1875–1933) – first People's Commissar of Education, 1917–1929.
- Alexandra Kollontai (1872–1952) – Bolshevik revolutionary and Marxist theoretician, first People's Commissar of Social Welfare.
- Yevgenia Bosch (1879–1925) – Ukrainian Bolshevik and a member of the Soviet government in Ukraine.

===== Cheka =====
- Felix Dzerzhinsky (1877–1926) – Bolshevik of Polish origin, head of the Cheka, the Soviet secret police.
- Jēkabs Peterss (1886–1938) – Latvian revolutionary, with Dzerzhinsky a founder of the Cheka and its acting chairman in 1918.
- Ivan Ksenofontov (1884–1926) – a founder of the Cheka and its first deputy chairman, and chairman of the Supreme Revolutionary Tribunal.
- Iosif Unshlikht (1879–1938) – Polish and Russian revolutionary, a founder of the Cheka and its deputy head from 1921.
- Martin Latsis (1888–1938) – Latvian Bolshevik and senior Cheka officer.
- Moisei Uritsky (1873–1918) – head of the Petrograd Cheka, assassinated in August 1918.
- Gleb Bokii (1879–1937) – leading member of the Cheka, who succeeded Uritsky at Petrograd in 1918.
- Mikhail Kedrov (1878–1941) – Old Bolshevik and head of the military section of the Cheka.
- Georgi Atarbekov (1891–1925) – Armenian Bolshevik and Soviet security police official.
- Vasiliy Mantsev (1889–1938) – high-ranking Cheka official.
- Yefim Yevdokimov (1891–1940) – Cheka and OGPU officer, a key figure in the Red Terror.
- Varvara Yakovleva (1884–1941) – Bolshevik party member and Cheka officer.
- Yakov Blumkin (1900–1929) – Left Socialist Revolutionary, later a Bolshevik and an agent of the Cheka.

===== Regicides =====
- Yakov Yurovsky (1878–1938) – Chekist, chief executioner of Nicholas II, his family and four of their servants.
- Peter Ermakov (1884–1952) – Bolshevik revolutionary, one of those who carried out the murder of the Romanov family.
- Grigory Nikulin (1895–1965) – Bolshevik revolutionary who took part in the execution of the imperial family.
- Pavel Medvedev (1888–1919) – head of the external guard of the Ipatiev House and a direct participant in the murder.
- Mikhail Medvedev-Kudrin (1891–1964) – Chekist and a direct participant in the murder.
- Pyotr Voykov (1888–1927) – Ukrainian Bolshevik and Soviet diplomat, a participant in the decision to murder the imperial family.

==== White leaders ====
- Anton Denikin (1872–1947) – lieutenant general, commander-in-chief of the Armed Forces of South Russia, 1919–1920.
- Alexander Kolchak (1874–1920) – naval officer and polar explorer, Supreme Ruler of the Russian State from 1918, based at Omsk.
- Pyotr Wrangel (1878–1928) – last commander of the White forces in southern Russia, based in Crimea in 1920.
- Pyotr Vologodsky (1863–1925) – last chairman of the Provisional Siberian Government and first head of Kolchak's Council of Ministers.
- Viktor Pepelyayev (1885–1920) – chairman of the Council of Ministers of the Russian State under Kolchak, 1919–1920.
- Nikolai Tchaikovsky (1851–1926) – Russian revolutionary who led the Provisional Government of the Northern Region after the Arkhangelsk coup of August 1918.
- Spiridon Merkulov (1870–1957) – head of the Provisional Priamurye Government, 1921–1922.
- Peter Struve (1870–1944) – political economist and philosopher, foreign minister in Wrangel's government in 1920.
- Alexander Krivoshein (1857–1921) – monarchist politician, minister of agriculture 1908–1915, later head of Wrangel's government in Crimea.
- Ivan Mikhailov (1891–1946) – economist and minister of finance under Kolchak.
- Alexander Guchkov (1862–1936) – chairman of the Third Duma and war minister in the Russian Provisional Government in 1917.
- Vladimir Kokovtsov (1853–1943) – prime minister of Russia, 1911–1914.
- Vasily Shulgin (1878–1976) – conservative politician and monarchist, a member of the White movement.
- Vladimir Purishkevich (1870–1920) – monarchist and ultra-nationalist politician who helped lead the Black Hundreds and founded the Union of the Archangel Michael.
- Sergei Melgunov (1879–1956) – historian and opponent of the Soviet government, author of Red Terror in Russia (1924).

===== White Terror =====
- Grigory Semyonov (1890–1946) – Japanese-backed leader of the White movement in Transbaikal and ataman of the Baikal Cossacks.
- Boris Annenkov (1889–1927) – ataman of the Siberian Cossacks and commander of the Seven Rivers Army, whose troops committed numerous crimes against civilians.
- Ivan Kalmykov (1890–1920) – ataman of the Ussuri Cossacks in the Russian Far East.
- Alexander Dutov (1879–1921) – Cossack ataman and lieutenant general who led the Orenburg Cossacks against the Bolsheviks.
- Pyotr Krasnov (1869–1947) – ataman of the Don Cossack Host, 1918–1919, and a writer; later a Nazi collaborator, hanged in Moscow in 1947.
- Andrei Shkuro (1887–1947) – Kuban Cossack cavalry commander and lieutenant general of the White Army; later a Nazi collaborator, hanged in 1947.
- Viktor Pokrovsky (1889–1922) – lieutenant general and one of the leaders of the White Army.
- Yakov Slashchov (1885–1929) – White general who defended Crimea in 1919–1920, and who returned to Soviet Russia in 1921.
- Roman von Ungern-Sternberg (1886–1921) – monarchist warlord who intervened in Mongolia against China.
- Sergey Rozanov (1869–1937) – lieutenant general and a leader of the White movement.
- Georgy Matsievsky (1880–1941) – Baikal Cossack and lieutenant general, active in the White movement in Transbaikal.
- Alexander Kutepov (1882–1930) – Volunteer Army officer, later chairman of the Russian All-Military Union, 1928–1930.
- Pavel Bermondt-Avalov (1877–1973) – commander of the West Russian Volunteer Army in Latvia and Lithuania in 1919.
- Fyodor Funtikov (1875/1876–1926) – Socialist Revolutionary head of the Transcaspian government, held responsible for the execution of the 26 Baku Commissars.

==== Green leaders ====
- Alexander Antonov (1889–1922) – Socialist Revolutionary, a leader of the Tambov Rebellion.
- Danylo Terpylo (1886–1919) – known as the Green Ataman, a commander of the Green armies in Ukraine against the Whites, the Red Army and the Ukrainian People's Republic.

==== Other leaders ====
===== Mensheviks =====
- Julius Martov (1873–1923) – Marxist theorist and a leader of the Mensheviks.
- Fyodor Dan (1871–1947) – political activist and journalist who helped found the Menshevik faction.
- Pavel Axelrod (1850–1928) – Marxist theorist and a leader of the Mensheviks.
- Irakli Tsereteli (1881–1959) – Georgian politician, a leading spokesman of the Social Democratic Party of Georgia and later of the RSDLP.
- Noe Zhordania (1868–1953) – Georgian Menshevik, head of the government of the Democratic Republic of Georgia, 1918–1921.

===== Socialist Revolutionaries =====
- Viktor Chernov (1873–1952) – founder and chief theorist of the Socialist Revolutionary Party, and president of the Constituent Assembly in January 1918.
- Nikolai Avksentiev (1878–1943) – chairman of the Provisional All-Russian Government, September to November 1918.
- Abram Gots (1882–1940) – Socialist Revolutionary leader.
- Vladimir Zenzinov (1880–1953) – Socialist Revolutionary and author.
- Maria Spiridonova (1884–1941) – leading Left Socialist Revolutionary, released from prison after the February Revolution of 1917.
- Boris Savinkov (1879–1925) – Socialist Revolutionary who founded the Union for the Defense of the Motherland and Freedom in 1918.

===== Anarchists =====
- Nestor Makhno (1888–1934) – Ukrainian anarchist and commander of the Makhnovshchina.
- Volin (1882–1945) – Russian anarchist intellectual who helped establish the Nabat and chaired the Makhnovshchina's military revolutionary council.
- Peter Arshinov (1887 – c. 1937) – Russian anarchist revolutionary and historian of the Makhnovshchina.
- Aron Baron (1891–1937) – Ukrainian anarchist, a leading figure in the Nabat and the Makhnovshchina.
- Maria Nikiforova (1885–1919) – Ukrainian anarchist partisan leader who commanded the Black Guards.
- Halyna Kuzmenko (1897–1978) – Ukrainian teacher and anarchist, a prominent figure in the Makhnovshchina.
- Olga Taratuta (1876–1938) – Ukrainian anarchist and a founder of the Anarchist Black Cross.

===== Foreign leaders =====
- Woodrow Wilson (1856–1924) – president of the United States, 1913–1921.
- Winston Churchill (1874–1965) – British Secretary of State for War, 1919–1921, under Lloyd George.
- Herbert Hoover (1874–1964) – director of the American Relief Administration, later president of the United States.
- Fridtjof Nansen (1861–1930) – Norwegian explorer, League of Nations High Commissioner for Refugees from 1921, active in Russian famine relief.
- Jacques Sadoul (1881–1956) – French army captain in Russia who became a communist and helped found the Communist International.

===== Foreign agents and observers =====
- R. H. Bruce Lockhart (1887–1970) – British diplomat and secret agent, the first British envoy to Bolshevik Russia in 1918.
- Sidney Reilly (c. 1873 – 1925) – Russian-born agent of the British Secret Service Bureau, involved in the 1918 plot against Lenin's government.
- Paul Dukes (1889–1967) – British intelligence officer in Bolshevik Russia, knighted in 1920 for his espionage.
- Arthur Ransome (1884–1967) – English author, journalist and intelligence agent.
- Robert Wilton (1868–1925) – British journalist, The Times correspondent in Russia, whose 1920 book on the Romanov murders made antisemitic ritual-murder claims.

===== National and independence leaders =====
- Mykhailo Hrushevsky (1866–1934) – Ukrainian historian and head of the Central Rada, 1917–1918.
- Volodymyr Vynnychenko (1880–1951) – Ukrainian writer and first prime minister of the Ukrainian People's Republic.
- Symon Petliura (1879–1926) – supreme commander of the Ukrainian People's Army and leader of the republic during the Ukrainian War of Independence.
- Pavlo Skoropadsky (1873–1945) – hetman of the Ukrainian State, April to December 1918.
- Mykola Mikhnovsky (1873–1924) – Ukrainian independence activist, lawyer and journalist.
- Noman Chelebidjikhan (1885–1918) – Crimean Tatar mufti and president of the Crimean People's Republic, killed by Bolshevik forces in 1918.
- Pshemakho Kotsev (1884–1962) – Circassian politician, second prime minister of the Mountainous Republic of the Northern Caucasus.
- Najmuddin of Gotzo (1859–1925) – mufti of the Mountainous Republic, who led uprisings against the Bolsheviks.
- Uzun-Hajji (1848–1920) – Sufi sheikh and emir of the North Caucasian Emirate.
- Said Shamil (1901–1981) – monarch of the North Caucasian Emirate during the Dagestan uprising of 1920–1921.
- Mustafa Shokay (1890–1941) – Kazakh activist, minister-president and ideologue of the Turkestan Autonomy.
- Zeki Velidi Togan (1890–1970) – historian and leader of the Bashkir revolutionary and liberation movement.
- Alexander Krasnoshchyokov (1880–1937) – Soviet politician, first leader of the Far Eastern Republic.
- Ivan Yermachenka (1894–1970) – Belarusian politician and diplomat, an officer in the White Army and adjutant to Wrangel.

== Places ==
- Arkhangelsk – White Sea port where the anti-Bolshevik Northern Region government was set up in August 1918.
- Ayan – Okhotsk coast settlement where the fighting ended in June 1923.
- Baku – oil city contested by Ottoman, British and Bolshevik forces in 1918 and taken by the Red Army in 1920.
- Chita – capital of the Far Eastern Republic from October 1920.
- Huliaipole – Makhno's birthplace and the capital of the Makhnovshchina.
- Irkutsk – city where Kolchak was handed over and shot in February 1920.
- Kazan – city taken in August 1918 by the Czechoslovak Legion and Komuch's People's Army, along with the imperial gold reserve.
- Moscow – Soviet capital from March 1918 and the objective of Denikin's 1919 offensive.
- Murmansk – ice-free northern port and site of the first British landing of the northern intervention in March 1918.
- Novocherkassk – Don Cossack capital where the Volunteer Army was formed in late 1917.
- Novorossiysk – port of the March 1920 evacuation of Denikin's forces.
- Omsk – seat of Kolchak's government until the city fell in November 1919.
- Perekop – isthmus fortified by Wrangel and stormed by the Red Army in November 1920.
- Petrograd – former imperial capital, held against Yudenich in 1919; strikes there in 1921 helped set off the Kronstadt rebellion.
- Rostov-on-Don – city the Volunteer Army left in February 1918 at the start of the Ice March.
- Sevastopol – Black Sea Fleet base and one of the ports of the November 1920 evacuation.
- Tashkent – capital of the Turkestan ASSR and seat of Soviet power in Turkestan.
- Tsaritsyn – Volga city attacked four times by the Whites, who held it from June 1919 to January 1920.
- Vladivostok – Pacific port, base of the Allied intervention in Siberia and the last major city taken, in October 1922.
- Yekaterinburg – Urals city where the imperial family was shot in July 1918.
- Yekaterinodar – Kuban city outside which Kornilov was killed in April 1918.

== Culture and society ==
=== Works about the Russian Civil War ===
==== Books ====
===== Fiction =====
- And Quiet Flows the Don (1928–1940) – Sholokhov's four-volume novel of the Don Cossacks; its hero, Grigory Melekhov, changes sides repeatedly.
- Byzantium Endures (1981) – Moorcock's novel narrated by an unreliable Russian émigré who recalls the revolution and civil war.
- Coup de Grâce (1939) – Yourcenar's triangle drama, set among German forces fighting the Bolsheviks in Courland.
- Doctor Zhivago (1957) – Pasternak's novel of a physician-poet, first published in Italy after being refused publication at home.
- How the Steel Was Tempered (1932–1934) – Ostrovsky's socialist realist novel of a young Bolshevik fighter, a fictionalised autobiography.
- R.V.S. (1926) – Gaidar's short novel of two boys in a Ukrainian village who shelter a wounded Red Army officer.
- The Road to Calvary (1918–1941) – Aleksey Tolstoy's trilogy on the fate of the Russian intelligentsia before, during and after the revolution of 1917.
- The Samovar Girl (1921) – Frederick Ferdinand Moore's romance-adventure novel set at Chita in eastern Siberia, drawing on his service there as a US Army intelligence officer during the Allied intervention.
- The White Guard (1925) – Bulgakov's novel of the Turbin family in Kiev from late 1918, as rival armies fight over the city.
- The Winter Road
- Odessa Stories
- Red Cavalry
- The Winter Road (2015) – Yuzefovich's documentary novel about the Yakut revolt and its opposing commanders, Pepelyayev and Strod.

===== Non-fiction =====
- 1905 (book)
- A People's Tragedy
- Belorussia under Soviet Rule, 1917–1957
- Leon Trotsky: A Revolutionary's Life
- Russia in Flames
- Russia in Revolution
- The House of Government
- The Russian Revolution: A New History
- Trotsky: A Biography

===== Memoirs and diaries =====
- Cursed Days (1936) – Bunin's diaries kept in Moscow and Odessa in 1918–1920; banned in the Soviet Union until the late 1980s.
- Siberia To-day
- Ten Days That Shook the World

===== Other works =====
- Adventures of a Postmodern Historian: Living and Writing the Past
- Sociology of Revolution

===== Propaganda =====
- History of the Russian Revolution
- New Course (Trotsky book)
- Lessons of October
- Terrorism and Communism
- The Dictatorship of the Proletariat (pamphlet)
- The Permanent Revolution and Results and Prospects
- The Revolution Betrayed
- The Mass Strike, the Political Party and the Trade Unions
- Their Morals and Ours: The class foundations of moral practice
- Towards Socialism or Capitalism?

==== Films ====
===== Fiction =====
- On the Red Front (1920) – Kuleshov's silent film in which a Red Army courier chases the Polish spy who has stolen his dispatch.
- The Forty-First (1927) – Protazanov's adaptation of Lavrenyov, in which a Red sharpshooter shoots her White-officer lover.
- Storm over Asia (1928) – Pudovkin's film of a Mongol trapper set up as a puppet ruler by an occupying British force, an episode with no basis in the historical record.
- Arsenal (1929) – Dovzhenko's account of the Kiev Arsenal January Uprising; the director had fought in the war on the side of the Central Rada.
- Chapaev (1934) – The Vasilyev brothers' fictionalised biography of the Red Army commander Chapayev, seen by 30 million people in its first year.
- Knight Without Armour (1937) – British film by Feyder in which a British agent (Donat) helps a countess (Dietrich) escape the country.
- Shchors (1939) – Dovzhenko and Solntseva's biography of the Bolshevik partisan Shchors, commissioned by Stalin and made during the Great Purge.
- Lenin in 1918 (1939) – Romm's film of Lenin amid famine, a conspiracy against the government and Kaplan's assassination attempt.
- Kotovsky (1942) – Faintsimmer's propaganda biopic of the Red Army commander Kotovsky.
- The Forty-First (1956) – Chukhrai's remake, which won the Special Jury Prize at the 1957 Cannes Film Festival.
- And Quiet Flows the Don (1957–1958) – Gerasimov's three-part adaptation of Sholokhov's novel.
- Optimistic Tragedy (1963) – Samsonov's adaptation of Vishnevsky's play, in which a woman commissar reorganizes anarchist sailors into a Red regiment.
- Doctor Zhivago (1965) – Lean's adaptation of Pasternak, winner of five Academy Awards.
- The Elusive Avengers (1967) – Ostern in which four youngsters fight an ataman's Cossack band; followed by two sequels.
- The Red and the White (1967) – Jancsó's Soviet–Hungarian film of Hungarian volunteers fighting for the Reds near the Volga in 1919.
- Commissar (1967) – Askoldov's film of a pregnant commissar billeted on a Jewish family at Berdichev; banned for twenty years.
- White Sun of the Desert (1970) – A Red Army soldier east of the Caspian Sea is left guarding the harem of a Basmachi leader; one of the most popular Soviet films.
- Bumbarash (1971) – Musical comedy after Gaidar, in which a returning prisoner of war is pulled between Reds, Whites and bandits.
- A Slave of Love (1976) – Mikhalkov's film of a silent-film company at work in Odessa, whose cameraman secretly films White atrocities.
- Coup de Grâce (1976) – Schlöndorff's West German adaptation of Yourcenar, set among Freikorps soldiers near Riga in 1919.
- The Chekist (1992) – The head of a Cheka tribunal breaks down under the Red Terror.
- Captain Conan (1996) – Tavernier's film of French raiders sent from the Macedonian front to the Dniester as part of the Allied intervention.
- Admiral (2008) – Biographical drama of Kolchak and his affair with Timiryova, criticized for its historical inaccuracy.
- Sunstroke (2014) – Mikhalkov's film of captured White officers in the Crimea after the evacuation of November 1920, from Bunin's story and Cursed Days.

==== Poetry ====
- Land of Scoundrels (completed 1923) – Yesenin's poem, set in the Urals in 1919, on the clash between the rebel Nomakh and the commissar Rassvetov.

== Treaties and documents ==
- Starobilsk agreement – Political and military alliance between Soviet Ukraine and the Makhnovists, signed 15 October 1920.
- Treaty of Brest-Litovsk – Separate peace between Russia and the Central Powers, 3 March 1918.
- Treaty of Riga – Peace between Poland, Soviet Russia and Soviet Ukraine, 18 March 1921, ending the Polish–Soviet War.
- Treaty of Tartu – Peace between Estonia and Soviet Russia, 2 February 1920.
- Treaty on the Creation of the USSR – Founding treaty of the Soviet Union, approved 30 December 1922.

== Economy ==
- New Economic Policy – Partial return to market trading, adopted at the Tenth Party Congress in March 1921.
- Supreme Soviet of the National Economy – VSNKh or Vesenkha, the supreme body for managing the economy, and chiefly industry, from December 1917.
- War communism – The economic and political system of Soviet Russia during the war, 1918–1921.

== Aftermath ==
- Basmachi movement – Insurgency in Central Asia, which lasted until 1934.
- Kremlin Wall Necropolis – Soviet national cemetery on Red Square, holding the dead of the 1917 Moscow uprising and later Soviet figures.
- Order of the Red Banner – The first Soviet military decoration, established 16 September 1918.
- Russian All-Military Union – Veterans' organization founded by Wrangel in emigration in September 1924.
- Soviet Union – State formed on 30 December 1922 by the Russian, Ukrainian, Byelorussian and Transcaucasian republics.
- White émigré – Russians who left the former empire in opposition to Bolshevik rule, estimated at 900,000 to 2 million people.

== Miscellaneous ==
- American Jewish anti-Bolshevism during the Russian Revolution – Anti-Bolshevik propaganda and organizing by affluent American Jews, among them Louis Marshall and Cyrus Adler.
- Berlin Conference (March 26-27, 1917) (26–27 March 1917) – German and Austro-Hungarian foreign ministers, chaired by Chancellor Bethmann Hollweg, drew up a protocol dividing prospective conquests in the east.
- Berlin Conference (November 2–6, 1917) (2–6 November 1917) – Meetings of German and Prussian ministers, then of German and Austro-Hungarian representatives, which divided civilian from military leaders over outright annexation.
- Bocci-Bocci – Italian corruption of "Bolshevism", meaning "break everything", used in Florence and Tuscany during the Biennio Rosso.
- Bolshevism on Trial (April 1919) – American silent propaganda film, made by Mayflower Photoplay and distributed by Select Pictures.
- First Red Scare – American fear of Bolshevism and anarchism, at its height in 1919–1920.
- Grimm–Hoffmann affair (May–June 1917) – Swiss scandal over Robert Grimm's secret attempt to broker a separate Russo-German peace, which forced Arthur Hoffmann's resignation.
- Interallied Mission to Poland (July 1920) – British and French mission sent to influence Polish policy, weeks before the Battle of Warsaw.
- Jewish Bolshevism – Antisemitic and anti-communist conspiracy theory holding that Jews were behind the revolution and controlled communism.
- Leeds Convention (3 June 1917) – British socialist convention that hailed the revolution and called for councils of workmen's and soldiers' delegates.
- Overman Committee (September 1918 – June 1919) – United States Senate subcommittee on German propaganda, extended in February 1919 to Bolshevik activity in America.
- Palmer raids (November 1919 and January 1920) – Mass arrests of suspected radicals by the US Justice Department; some 6,000 people were arrested and 556 deported.
- Philosophers' ships (1922) – The expulsion of intellectuals from Soviet Russia.
- Red Flag riots (1918–1919) – Attacks in Brisbane by returned Australian soldiers on socialists and the Russian community.
- Red Summer (1919) – White supremacist attacks on African Americans in more than three dozen US cities and one rural Arkansas county.
- Storm on the Stock Exchange (11 February 1918) – Attack on the Copenhagen stock exchange by unemployed Danish syndicalists.
- United States and the Russian Revolution – American responses to the revolution, from intervention in the civil war to recognition of the Soviet Union in 1933.

== Bibliography ==
The works below all cover the Russian Civil War and carry extensive bibliographies for further research.

- Smith, S. A. (2017). Russia in Revolution: An Empire in Crisis, 1890 to 1928. New York: Oxford University Press.
- Engelstein, L. (2017). Russia in Flames: War, Revolution, Civil War, 1914–1921. New York: Oxford University Press.
- Figes, O. (1996). A People's Tragedy: A History of the Russian Revolution. New York: Viking.
- McMeekin, S. (2017). The Russian Revolution: A New History. New York: Basic Books.
- Smele, J. (2016). The "Russian" Civil Wars, 1916–1926: Ten Years That Shook the World. New York: Oxford University Press. (Note: Contains an extensive 46-page bibliography of English and non-English works on the "Russian" Civil Wars.)

== See also ==
- Category:Russian Civil War
- Index of articles related to the Russian Revolution and Civil War
