= Ukraine after the Russian Revolution =

Period from 1917 to 1921 in Ukraine

Various factions fought over Ukrainian territory after the collapse of the Russian Empire following the Russian Revolution of 1917 and after World War I ended in 1918, resulting in the collapse of Austria-Hungary, which had ruled Ukrainian Galicia. The crumbling of the empires had a great effect on the Ukrainian nationalist movement, and in a short period of four years a number of Ukrainian governments sprang up. This period was characterized by optimism and by nation-building, as well as by chaos and civil war. Matters stabilized somewhat in 1921 with the territory of modern-day Ukraine divided between Soviet Ukraine (which would become a constituent republic of the Soviet Union in 1922) and Poland, and with small ethnic Ukrainian regions belonging to Czechoslovakia and to Romania.

== Political events ==
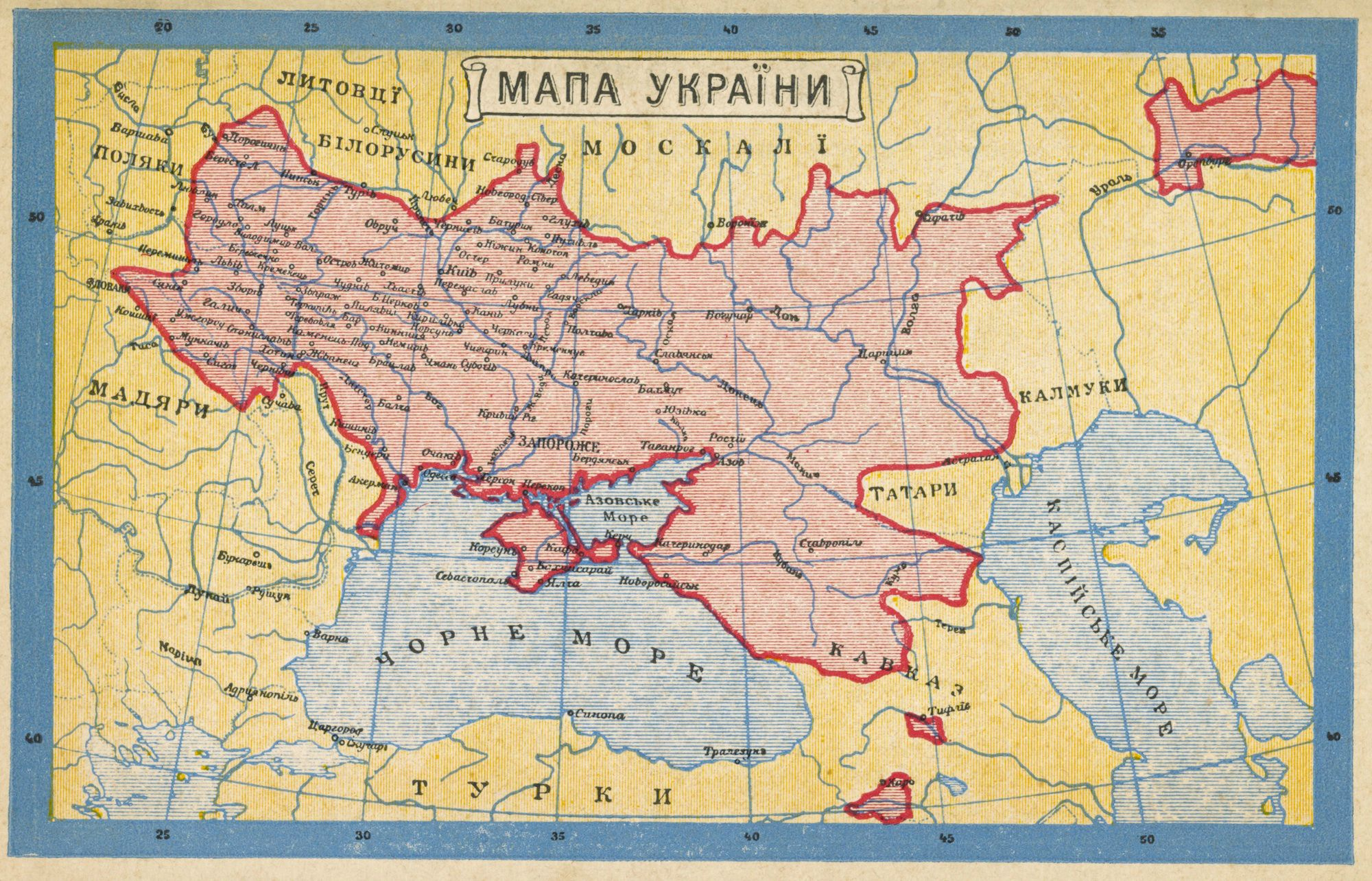
Ukraine according to an old postal stamp from 1919.

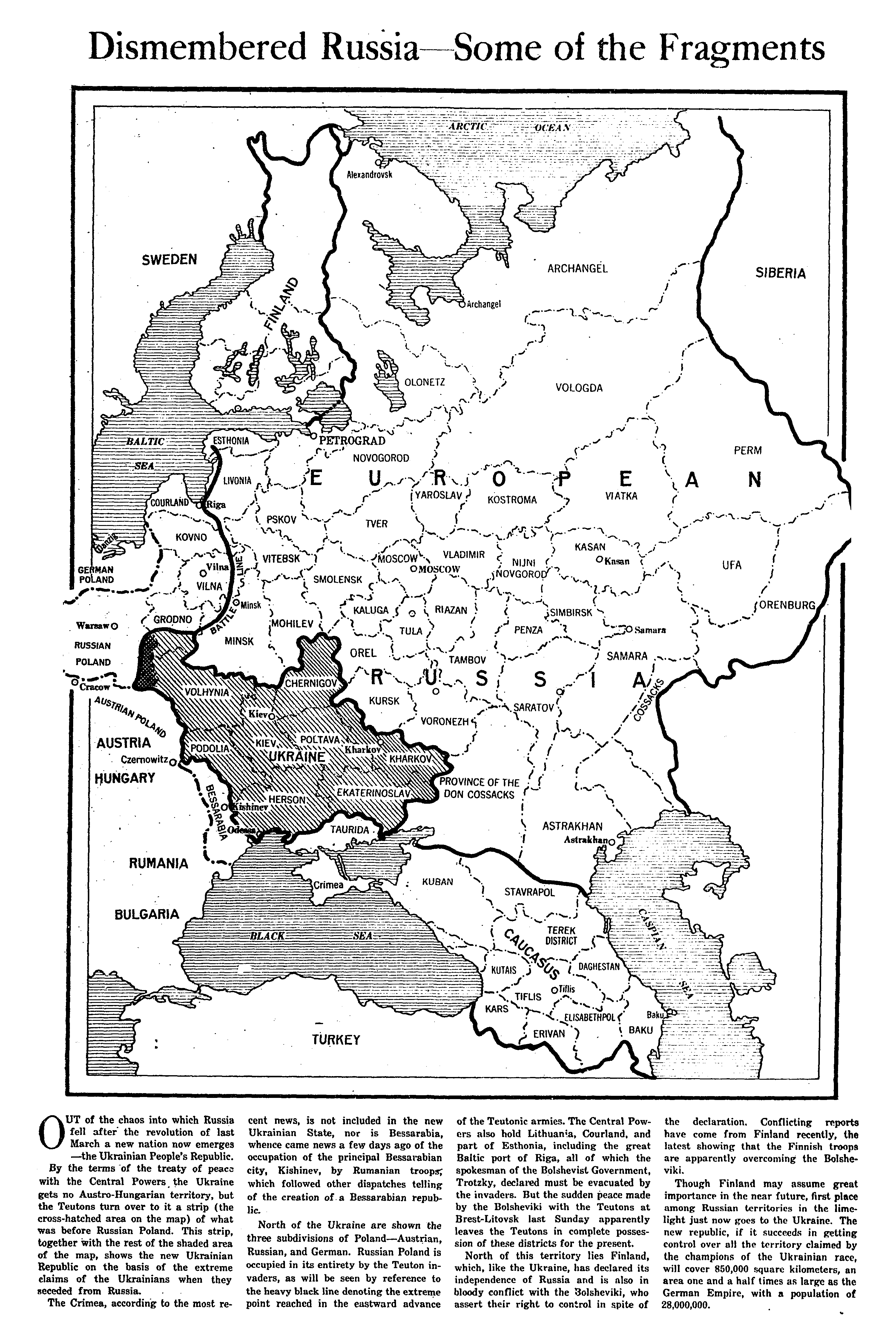
February 1918 article from The New York Times showing a map of the Imperial Russian territories claimed by Ukrainian People's Republic at the time, before the annexation of the Austro-Hungarian lands of the West Ukrainian People's Republic. Ukraine as depicted on this map is a state that the German led armies of the Central Powers had removed from Russian domination just before the 3 March 1918, signing of the Treaty of Brest-Litovsk granting Ukraine independence from Russia. On 29 April 1918, the Ukrainian People's Republic was dissolved.

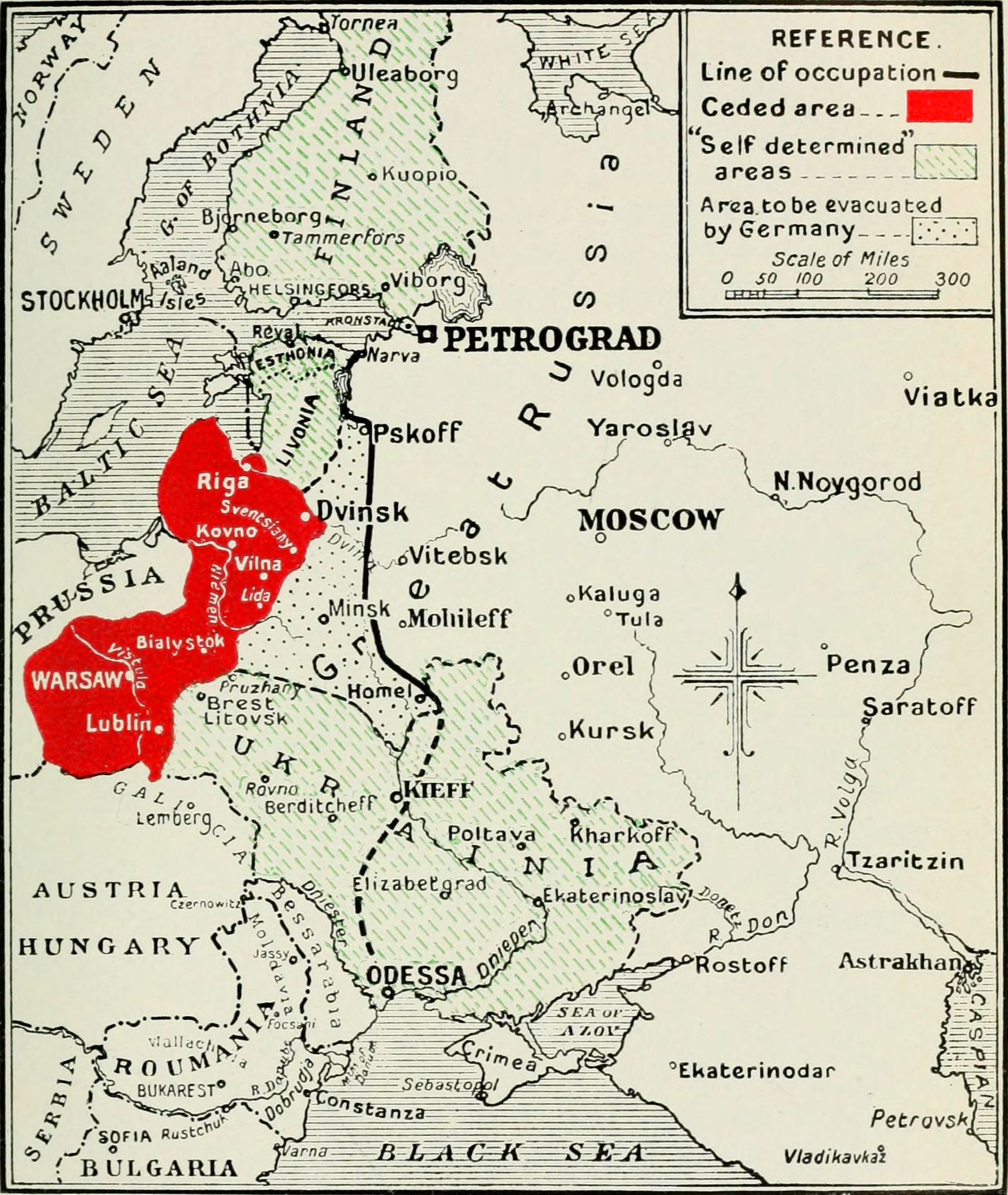
Ukraine's borders drawn up at Brest-Litovsk.

After the abdication of Tsar Nicholas II, Ukrainian community leaders were able finally to organize the Central Rada in Kyiv (Tsentral'na rada), headed by Mykhailo Hrushevsky. They sought an approval of the Russian Provisional Government in Petrograd (Saint Petersburg) to establish a regional government. The Central Rada consisted of various political parties such as Ukrainian Party of Socialist Revolutionary, Ukrainian Social Democratic Labour Party, Russian Social Democratic Labour Party, General Jewish Labor Bund, Polish national party, representatives of Army, peasantry, workers, and others. It quickly gained the support of elements of the Imperial Army in Ukraine. On 23 June 1917, the Central Rada issued its First Universal, declaring Ukrainian autonomy within a Russian federation, which was enthusiastically supported by the First All-Ukrainian Peasant Congress on 28 June.

Shortly after the early-November Bolshevik coup in Petrograd and a similar event in Kyiv, the Central Rada issued the Third Universal on 20 November 1917, declaring a Ukrainian People's Republic (UNR) in Kyiv and condemning the Bolsheviks initiated disorder in Petrograd as politically illegal. Because the legal government in Petrograd was dissolved, the Central Rada had no other choice but to declare its autonomy with its own regional government that was previously approved by the Russian Provisional Government. (Note: In December 1917, the Central Rada issued Ukrainian currency.) The UNR refused to recognize the newly installed Soviet government, which in turn caused a tension within the Central Rada. The Bolshevik government demanded an all-Russian union. The Bolsheviks faction convened an All-Ukrainian Congress of Workers', Soldiers', and Peasants' Soviets in Kyiv in December demanding recognition of Sovnarkom from the Central Rada. Finding themselves to be a small minority at the congress of 2,500 delegates, the 100 Bolsheviks and a few others left to join a congress of local deputies in Kharkiv which they renamed the All-Ukrainian Congress of Workers', Soldiers', and Peasants' Soviets. They declared the Bolshevik government of Ukraine (Respublyka Rad Ukrayiny) with Christian Rakovksy as its head on December 25, 1917 and claimed that the government of the Ukrainian People's Republic were outlaws.

Upon taking over the government in Petrograd, the Bolsheviks immediately sued for peace with the Central Powers. After more than two months of negotiations, the Soviet delegation led by Joffe (Note: Trotsky, People's Commissar for Foreign Affairs, appointed Joffe, but Trotsky resigned his post prior to the signing of the Treaty of Brest-Litovsk. Joffe accompanied the signatory team under protest as a consultant. Grigori Yakovlovich Sokolnikov led the signatory team and signed for the Bolsheviks.) signed the Treaty of Brest-Litovsk, a peace treaty between Russia and the Central Powers, on 3 March 1918. (Note: The Bolsheviks agreed to the terms of the treaty because if they did not, the German-led armies of the Central Powers would push into Petrograd and Moscow and remove the Bolsheviks from power.) (Note: On 7 March 1918, the Bolsheviks proclaimed Moscow their capital. The Treaty of Brest-Litovsk placed the independent Baltic countries under German suzerainty. The Bolsheviks were concerned that with the Baltics under German suzerainty, the Germans could easily move a German army into the Winter Palace and overthrow the Bolshevik government located in Petrograd. Lenin commented that if the Germans armies were to occupy both Petrograd and Moscow, the Bolsheviks could retreat to the substantial resources of the Ural-Kuznets region.) This treaty recognized a pro-German Ukrainian government. An independent Ukraine was not a popular notion among Russians as well as many Ukrainians. An independent Ukraine coupled with the 1918 Russian great hunger (Note: The Central Powers occupation of Ukraine in the spring of 1918 caused a reduction of available foodstuffs in Russia.) greatly weakened the leadership of Lenin and the Bolsheviks in Russia. Ukraine continued to gain territory after the treaty was signed because the armies of the Central Powers pushed deeper into Eastern Ukraine by late spring 1918, Ukraine with support from the Central Powers had gained control of Rostov on Don and began to receive oil shipments from Baku through the Don ports of Rostov. (Note: In the 27 August supplement to the Treaty of Brest-Litovsk, Germany would grant financial credits to the Bolshevik government in Moscow in return for 25% of the oil from Baku. This oil was shipped across the Caspian and up the lower Volga to Ukraine.) During May to October 1918, peace negotiations were held between Russia and Ukraine. The Cossacks fiercely abhorred Bolshevism. After the 6 July 1918 assassination of the German Ambassador to Russia Count Mirbach in Moscow, many Bolsheviks who resented the terms of the peace treaty began guerrilla warfare and terror with support from Felix Dzerzhinsky, the head of the Cheka.

In late 1917 to early 1918, the UNR for couple of months lost Kyiv to the Bolsheviks, but the UNR with Central Powers support controlled of much of Ukraine, pushed the Bolsheviks out of Kyiv on 1 March 1918, and forced the Bolsheviks to convene their government in Taganrog, on the coast of the Sea of Azov. The Congress of Free Hubb'andmen on 29 April 1918 (with the great support of Austrian-German occupants), elected tsarist general Pavlo Skoropadsky as Hetman of Ukraine. He proclaimed the overthrow of the Central Rada Government thus suspending the UNR and also outlawed the Communist Party in Ukraine. After the socialist Directorate of Ukraine overthrew the Hetman's government (Note: With the end of World War I in November 1918 and the defeat of the Central Powers, the Austrian-German support of the Hetman's government evaporated.) and then reestablished the UNR on 13–14 November 1918, the forces of the exiled Ukrainian Soviet Republic re-entered Ukraine. The Ukrainian government declared a war on 16 January 1919. The Bolsheviks amid fluid alliances with various anarchists would eventually defeat the Ukrainian army that was fighting on several fronts simultaneously.

Meanwhile, the Western Ukrainian People's Republic (ZUNR) was declared in Lviv on 19 October 1918. Within the ZUNR were the largest oil reserves in Europe. The ZUNR formally (and largely symbolically) joined the UNR in hope to gain some support in the war against Poland. A UNR delegation sent to Paris could not gain recognition at the Treaty of Versailles at the end of the World War. UNR forces fared poorly during the Polish–Soviet War and a late alliance with Poland was not enough to secure the republic. After the Treaty of Riga, Ukrainian territory found itself split among the Ukrainian SSR in the center, Poland in the west, and Crimea, Kuban, and the former Cossacks lands became southern Russia in the east. Carpathian Ruthenia found itself in Czechoslovakia, and Bukovina in Romania.

In December 1922, with Bolsheviks secure in their power over its territory, Soviet Ukraine joined the Russian, Byelorussian, and Transcaucasian republics to form the Union of Soviet Socialist Republics.

== International involvements ==
The West Ukrainian People's Republic in 1919

The chaotic conditions in Ukraine attracted attention from the major powers. Canadian scholar Orest Subtelny provides a context from the long span of European history:

In 1919 total chaos engulfed Ukraine. Indeed, in the modern history of Europe no country experienced such complete anarchy, bitter civil strife, and total collapse of authority as did Ukraine at this time. Six different armies-– those of the Ukrainians, the Bolsheviks, the Whites, the Entente [French], the Poles and the anarchists – operated on its territory. Kyiv changed hands five times in less than a year. Cities and regions were cut off from each other by the numerous fronts. Communications with the outside world broke down almost completely. The starving cities emptied as people moved into the countryside in their search for food.

Outside powers acted on entirely different visions for Ukraine. The British ridiculed the pretensions of the new nation. White Russians, united only by their opposition to Bolshevism, wanted to restore Ukraine as a Russian province. Russian Bolsheviks did not believe in nationalism and twice invaded Ukraine and failed efforts to seize control and collectivize the farms; they succeeded the third time in 1920. Americans were outraged at the large-scale massacres of Jews in 1919. Germany supported Ukrainian nationalism as a foil to Russia, but its chief goal was to obtain urgently needed food supplies. Ukraine was too poorly organized to fulfill the promised food shipments. Poland wanted Ukraine in order to build a population that could stand up against Germany. France wanted Poland as a strong anti-German ally and therefore supported Polish ambitions. Poland did seize Western Ukraine in 1919, but was driven out from all other regions in the Polish–Soviet War.

== Ukrainian Nationalist government (1917–1920) ==
- General Secretariat and Council of People's Ministers of Central Rada of the Ukrainian People's Republic: 17 March 1917 – 29 April 1918.
- Council of Ministers of the Hetmanate (Ukrainian State): 29 April 1918 – 14 December 1918.
- State Secretariat of Ukrainian National Council of the West Ukrainian People's Republic: 18 October 1918 – 22 January 1919 (de facto independent until July 1919).
- Directorate of the Ukrainian People's Republic: 14 November 1918 – 1920.

== Ukrainian Soviet governments ==
- Ukrainian People's Republic of Soviets: 25 December 1917 – March 1918.
- Second Ukrainian Soviet government: 20 November 1918 – August 1919.
- All-Ukrainian Revolutionary Committee: April 1919 – July 1919.
- Third Ukrainian Soviet government: 21 December 1919 – 1991.
- Galician Revkom: 8 July 1920 – 21 September 1920

== See also ==
- Bibliography of Ukrainian history
- Bibliography of the Russian Revolution and Civil War
- Outline of Ukrainian history
- Outline of the Russian Revolution and Civil War
- Outline of the Russian Civil War
- Index of articles related to the Russian Revolution and Civil War
- List of states and regions involved in the Russian Civil War
- Bibliography of the Russian Revolution and Civil War
- The "Russian" Civil Wars, 1916–1926: Ten Years That Shook the World
- Russia in Flames: War, Revolution, Civil War, 1914–1921
- Russia in Revolution: An Empire in Crisis, 1890 to 1928
- Russia: Revolution and Civil War, 1917—1921
- The Russian Revolution: A New History
- Ukrainian War of Independence

== Sources ==
- Magocsi, Paul Robert (1996). A History of Ukraine. Toronto: University of Toronto Press. ISBN 978-0-8020-0830-5.
- Subtelny, Orest (1988). Ukraine: A History, 1st edition, Toronto: University of Toronto Press. ISBN 978-0-8020-8390-6.
- Velychenko, Stephen (2010). Statebuilding in Revolutionary Ukraine. A Comparative Study of Governments and Bureaucrats 1917-1922 (Toronto 2012) ISBN 978-1-4426-4132-7
- Velychenko, Stephen, Painting Imperialism and Nationalism Red. The Ukrainian Marxist Critique of Russian Communist Rule in Ukraine (1918–1925) (Toronto, 2015) ISBN 978-1-4426-4851-7
