= Belorussia under Soviet Rule, 1917–1957 =

1972 book by Ivan S. Lubachko

- Book cover
- Author: Ivan S. Lubachko
- Language: English
- Subject: Eastern Europe, History of Belarus, History of the Soviet Union
- Genre: Non-fiction, history
- Publisher: University Press of Kentucky
- Publication date: 1972
- Pages: 219
- ISBN: 978-0813112633
- Website: University Press of Kentucky

Belorussia under Soviet Rule, 1917–1957 is a book by Ivan S. Lubachko published in 1972, (Note: Reprinted in 2014 in paperback and ebook format.) by University Press of Kentucky. The work is a history of the Byelorussian Soviet Socialist Republic, from the Russian Revolution in 1917 to the beginning of the Khrushchev era in 1957.

== Academic journal reviews ==
- Armstrong, John A. (1973). "Reviewed work: Belorussia under Soviet Rule, 1917-1957., Ivan S. Lubachko". Slavic Review. 32 (2): 390–391. doi:10.2307/2495988. JSTOR 2495988.
- Bertsch, Gary K. (1973). "National Self-Determination and Proletarian Internationalism". Journal of International Affairs. 27 (1): 129–132. JSTOR 24356616.
- Dingley, James (1973). "Reviewed work: Belorussia under Soviet Rule, 1917-1957, Ivan S. Lubachko". The Slavonic and East European Review. 51 (125): 610–611. JSTOR 4206805.
- Frederiksen, Oliver J. (1973). "Reviewed work: Belorussia Under Soviet Rule, 1917-1957, Ivan S. Lubachko". Osteuropa. 23 (7): 557–558. JSTOR 44904082.
- Pollard, Alan P. (1973). "Reviewed work: Belorussia under Soviet Rule, 1917-1957, Ivan S. Lubachko". The Historian. 35 (4): 660–661. JSTOR 24443214.
- Reshetar, John S. (1973). "Reviewed work: Belorussia under Soviet Rule, 1917-1957, Ivan S. Lubachko". The American Historical Review. 78 (5): 1502. doi:10.2307/1854188. JSTOR 1854188.
- Sadouski, J. (1974). "Reviewed work: Belorussia under Soviet Rule, 1917-1957, IVAN S. LUBACHKO". Canadian Slavonic Papers / Revue Canadienne des Slavistes. 16 (3): 474–475. JSTOR 40866765.
- Sukiennicki, Wiktor (1973). "Reviewed work: Belorussia under Soviet Rule, 1917-1957, Ivan S. Lubachko". The Russian Review. 32 (2): 210. doi:10.2307/127695. JSTOR 127695.
- Warzeski, Walter C. (1973). "Reviewed work: Belorussia Under Soviet Rule, 1917-1957, Ivan S. Lubachko". Journal of Baltic Studies. 4 (4): 403–404. JSTOR 43210524.

== About the author ==
Ivan S. Lubachko is an author and professor of history at Murray State University.

== See also ==
- The Russian Revolution: A New History
- Russia: Revolution and Civil War, 1917—1921
- The Whisperers: Private Life in Stalin's Russia
- Russia in Revolution: An Empire in Crisis, 1890 to 1928
