= Chapan rebellion =

Peasant Rebellion (1919)

- Part of the Russian Civil War
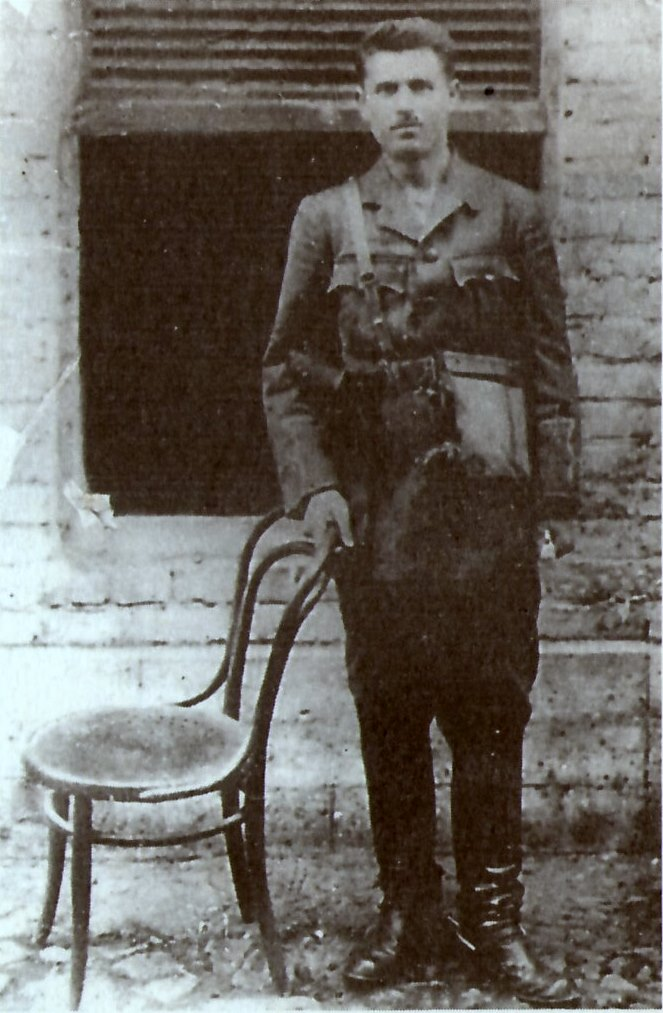
- Aleksey Dolinin, leader of the Chapan Rebellion
Date	3 March – April 1919
Location	Samara Governorate and Simbirsk Governorate, Russian SFSR
Result	Bolshevik victory

Belligerents
Russian SFSR: 4th Army; Cheka	Rebel peasants

Commanders and leaders
Mikhail Frunze	Aleksey Dolinin

Strength
13,000	30,000 – 150,000

Casualties and losses
Unknown	10,000 deaths

The Chapan rebellion (Russian: Чапанная война, romanized: Chapannaya voyna, lit. 'Chapan War') was one of the largest peasant uprisings against the Bolsheviks during the Russian Civil War from March to April 1919. Peasants in the Simbirsk Governorate and Samara Governorate formed Green armies that rebelled against the Bolsheviks due to forced requisitions and conscription. Rebels led by Aleksey Dolinin captured the city of Stavropol, killed Bolshevik officials, and gained control of most of the Stavropol-Syzran area. The main rebellion was defeated by the Red Army a week later and remnants were defeated by April.

== Background ==
By the turn of 1919, the Russian Civil War was raging in the upper Volga region, which was under the control of the Russian Soviet Federative Socialist Republic (RSFSR) of the Bolsheviks. At that time, the White Army was preparing their advance from the Urals into the cities of Ufa, Izhevsk and Votkinsk, so the Bolsheviks required all available food and manpower for the upcoming defense of the region. Peasants were subjected to the extremely unpopular policy of prodrazvyorstka (forced requisitions) which led to the confiscation of their grain and produce, and the forced conscription of young male villagers into the Red Army. By February, over 3 million pudy of grain had been confiscated by the Bolsheviks in Simbirsk Governorate alone. These requisitions often exceeded the surplus, and turned into little more than robberies where Bolshevik soldiers took even products not subject to collection. Many peasants and their communities were effectively condemned to hunger, as there was not enough produce left to feed themselves. Young men were also conscripted into the Red Army using all possible means, including torture. Provincial Bolshevik authorities began to warn central authorities of the agitation caused by these abuses, but they were not listened to.

== Rebellion ==
On 3 March 1919, the inhabitants of Novodeviche, a village in the uyezd of Senguilei in the Samara Governorate, attacked a Bolshevik squad in charge of requisitioning their harvest. Apparently, the Bolsheviks allowed the gathering of the village in a carnival while doing the requisitions, taking more grain than usually required by the orders, which gave the outraged peasants the opportunity to organize and demand responsibilities. When the villagers learned that the Bolsheviks were calling for reinforcements, the soldiers were disarmed and the officials deposed.

The first Bolshevik soldiers sent to quell the movement went over to their side and shot their officers. They soon established a headquarters and the neighboring villages were added. They then set about persecuting the Bolsheviks and members of the Poor Peasant Committees (bodies through which they were governed), leaving the region in charge of Soviets without Bolshevik representation. On the afternoon of 5 March, when the authorities in Simbirsk found out about the events in Novodeviche, they ordered the immediate end of the movement and promised to send a committee to study the situation. Two days later, a delegation from the local Cheka issued an ultimatum demanding submission under penalty of harsh punishment.

On 7 March, despite their poor weapons and little training, the rebels captured Stavropol with the proclamation "All power to the workers! Down with the rule of the Bolsheviks!" and with hardly any fighting. They named Aleksey Dolinin, a veteran lieutenant of World War I, as their leader,. The rebels published appeals, news and orders in the local newspaper, removed all Bolshevik iconography from public places, and began to make plans to seize the governorates of Samara and Simbirsk. That same day Valerian Kuybyshev, the commander of the 4th Red Army, was put in charge of suppressing the revolt. Their plans were simple, to recover Stavropol, where the peasant leaders were, without fighting major battles. It was decided to send the komandarm Mikhail Frunze with 13,000 soldiers to crush the movement. They consisted of units withdrawn from the front line, the 1st Samara Workers' Regiment and the 2nd International Company, formed by Hungarians, both units were armed with modern rifles and machine guns. They were reinforced with units of the 4th Army.

On 9 March, however, the region was restless and the reserve regiment stationed in Samara mutinied. The following day, there was a state of siege in Syzran as peasants in the area rose up, destroying volost offices, burning documents and property, and every Bolshevik or sympathizer in the region was hunted down. Captured Red Army soldiers began to be tortured by submerging them in the icy waters of the Volga. Within two weeks, the movement spread through both Samara and Simbirsk governorates, and soon much of the Volga basin was in their hands. It was the first vosstaniye, or great peasant rebellion, that mobilized huge Green armies, conquered cities, and had a coherent political program. The rebels demanded the abolition of requisitions, the free election of the soviets, and the end of the "Bolshevik commissarocracy". They came to have an army of at least 30,000 men, although some historians raise the figure to 100,000 or 150,000.

== Suppression ==
On 13 March, the Syzransky Revolutionary Committee decreed the execution of all those involved in the insurrection. That same day, units of the local Cheka and special units attacked Stavropol relying on cavalry and two machine guns, but were repulsed and many civilians fled to Syzran. A military detachment and members of the Komsomol led by Alexandra Smirnitskaya were also dispatched to take the village of Usinskoye, but were annihilated. Smirnitskaya, who was acting as a medical assistant, was killed when she was beaten severely with a club and a stake driven through the throat. In the vicinity of the village of Eremkino, the rebels were commanded by Irina Felichkina, a veteran of a battalion of defenders of Petrograd, mounted and with a whip giving orders until she was captured and shot.

The next day, the Red Army surrounded Stavropol and assaulted it, meeting little resistance because the rebels were poorly organized and dispersed. A few managed to break through the encirclement and flee to the town of Yagodnoye; the rest fell to enemy fire and others were captured. The officers were summarily shot or hanged. Novodeviche fell on 15 March.

By early April, the revolt had been defeated, but the rebels were able to briefly seize the Bazarnaya train station, destroying the rails. The fighting ended by the middle of the month.

== Consequences ==
Villages in the region were burned, there were mass arrests of peasants, a policy of executing one in ten prisoners was implemented, there were summary trials in Syzran, near which a concentration camp was built that was soon overcrowded, so they shot the remaining prisoners. In Samara, Frunze dedicated himself to looking for spies and traitors, and the leaders of the uprising who were fleeing the persecution. Dolinin managed to hide in the forest until he turned to join the Red Army, fighting against the forces of Anton Denikin and being captured in Rostov-on-Don but escaped. Dolinin then participated in the Polish-Soviet war where he was wounded and in hospital wrote a letter requesting forgiveness from the Central Executive Committee, which granted it, returned to his native village and although he spent several years in prison during the 1930s, he was released and died naturally.

The Chapan rebellion favored Alexander Kolchak's White Army in their advance westward, in fact, his movement agents were officially blamed, and strengthened the military measures led by Leon Trotsky. It is estimated that it cost the lives of 10,000 peasants. It got its name from the clothes of the rebels: the chapan - a winter coat, made of sheepskin, a special robe belted with a sash, a popular clothing among the peasants of the region during cold weather. The uprising was brutally suppressed, and its participants, mostly peasants, were subjected to terror and mass repression.

A new uprising broke out years later, on 24 January 1921. In the parish of Chuvasko-Sormin (uyezd of Yadrinskii, in neighboring Chuvash Autonomous Soviet Socialist Republic) between five and seven thousand peasants rose up against the requisitions, attacking the local police; but their uprising was crushed just three days later. The participants of these revolts were not rehabilitated until 1996 by decree of the Russian president Boris Yeltsin.

== See also ==
- Tambov rebellion
- Kronstadt rebellion

== Bibliography ==
- Artemov, Andréi (5 March 2014). "Бунт, который был. 95 лет Чапанной войне". Другой город (in Russian).
- Efimov, L.A. (2009). Аликовская энциклопедия (in Russian). Cheboksary: Чувашское книжное изд-во. ISBN 978-5-7670-1630-3.
- Gilley, Christopher (2014). "Peasant Uprisings/Tambovshina". In Ute Daniel; Peter Gatrell; Oliver Janz; Heather Jones; Jennifer Keene; Alan Kramer; Bill Nasson (eds.). 1914-1918-online. International Encyclopedia of the First World War. Berlin: Freie Universität Berlin.
- Powell, Jim (2007). Wilson's War: How Woodrow Wilson's Great Blunder Led to Hitler, Lenin, Stalin, and World War II. New York: Crown Publishing Group. ISBN 9780307422712.
- Werth, Nicolas (1999). "1. A State against its People: violence, repression, and terror in the Soviet Union". In Stéphane Courtois (ed.). The Black Book of Communism. Cambridge: Harvard University Press. ISBN 978-0-674-07608-2. OCLC 949773841.
- Seleiev, Serguéi (15 April 2017). "Восставшие "чапаны"". Kommersant (in Russian).
