= Cherek Campaign (1919) =

White counterinsurgency campaign against Bolshevik partisans

Cherek Gorge Campaign
- Part of the Southern Front of the Russian Civil War
| Date | February–March 1919 |
| Location | Cherek Gorge, Nalchiksky Okrug, Mountain ASSR (present-day Kabardino-Balkaria, Russia) |
| Result | White-Circassian victory |

Belligerents
| Russian State; Kabardians | Russian SFSR; Balkars |

Commanders and leaders
| (Circassia) Zaour-Bek Daoutokov-Serebryakov | Unknown |

Units involved
| 2nd Kabardian Cavalry Regiment; Mounted Division of Rittmeister Khetagurov; Detachment of Colonel Anufriev | Unknown |

Strength
| Unknown | Unknown |

Casualties and losses
| Unknown | Heavy (estimated) |

Cherek Gorge Campaign was a White Army counter-insurgency operation conducted during the Russian Civil War in February–March 1919 in the Cherek Gorge.

== History ==
In early 1919, during the Russian Civil War, White forces led by Colonel Zaour-Bek Daoutokov-Serebryakov conducted a campaign in the Cherek Gorge to suppress Bolshevik partisan activity. The expedition included Kabardian cavalry units, a mounted division, and additional detachments. Utilizing local knowledge and disciplined tactics, the White forces operated in difficult mountainous terrain.

The campaign concluded with a White victory, effectively dismantling the partisan resistance and restoring control over the area.

== See also ==
- Bibliography of the Russian Revolution and Civil War
- Outline of the Russian Revolution and Civil War
- Index of articles related to the Russian Revolution and Civil War
- The "Russian" Civil Wars, 1916–1926: Ten Years That Shook the World
- Russia in Flames: War, Revolution, Civil War, 1914–1921
- Russia in Revolution: An Empire in Crisis, 1890 to 1928
- Russia: Revolution and Civil War, 1917—1921
- The Russian Revolution: A New History
