= Rebellion in Tskhinvali =

1918 military uprising by Ossetians

- Part of Georgian–Ossetian conflict (1918–1920)
Date	19–22 March, 1918
Location	Tskhinvali, Georgia
Result	Georgian victory

Belligerents
Georgia	Ossetian insurgents

Commanders and leaders
Valiko Jugheli; Kosta Kaziev	Unknown

The Rebellion in Tskhinvali was military uprising by Ossetians against the Democratic Republic of Georgia in the city of Tskhinvali in March 1918. The uprising ended with failure.

== Background ==
After the 1917 February Revolution that resulted in the abdication of Tsar Nicholas II of Russia, the Ossetians set up a National Council of Ossetians which convened in Java in June 1917 and advocated the creation of organs of self-rule in Ossetian-inhabited areas on both sides of the Caucasus. The Council was internally divided along the ideological lines and soon became dominated by the Bolsheviks who called for the unification of North and South Ossetias and the incorporation of South Ossetia into Soviet Russia. Already in February 1918, there were numerous outbreaks of disobedience among the Ossetian peasants who refused to pay taxes to the Tiflis-based Transcaucasian government.

== Uprising ==
On 15 March 1918, the Ossetian peasants rose in rebellion and managed to hold off an offensive by a Georgian People's Guard punitive detachment commanded by an ethnic Ossetian officer, Kosta Kaziev. The fighting culminated in the town of Tskhinvali which was occupied by the rebels on 19 March 1918. The Georgian People's Guard regained the control of Tskhinvali on 22 March. The uprising was finally suppressed and harsh repressive measures established in the region, generating resentment against the Mensheviks, being now equated, in the eyes of the Ossetians, with Georgians.

This also opened the way for strong pro-Bolshevik sentiments among the Ossetians.

Valiko Jugheli spoke about the Ossetians saying, "Our worst and most relentless enemies" and "These traitors should be cruelly punished. There is no other way".

== Second Rebbelion of Ossetians in Georgia ==
In October 1919, revolts against the Mensheviks broke out again in several areas. On 23 October, rebels in the Roki area proclaimed the establishment of Soviet power and began advancing toward Tskhinvali, but suffered defeat and retreated to the Soviet-controlled Terek district.

The year 1919 also saw a series of fruitless discussions concerning the status and governance of the region. Ossetians demanded a degree of autonomy comparable with the one granted to the Abkhazians and Muslim Georgians in Adjara. However, no final decision was made, and the Georgian government outlawed the National Council of South Ossetia, a Bolshevik-dominated body, and refused any grant of autonomy. Bolsheviks fully exploited the tensions and the Menshevik mistakes to further strengthen their influence among the Ossetians.
