= Krasnaya Gorka mutiny =

1919 anti-Bolshevik mutiny at a Petrograd coastal fort

- Part of the Russian Civil War (Petrograd front)
Date	13-16 June 1919
Location	Fort Krasnaya Gorka, southern shore of the Gulf of Finland
Result	Mutiny suppressed by the Red Army and the Red Baltic Fleet

Belligerents
Russian SFSR	Mutinous garrison of forts Krasnaya Gorka, Seraya Loshad and Obruchev

Commanders and leaders
Joseph Stalin (political coordinator)	Nikolai Neklyudov

Strength
7th Red Army units, Red Baltic Fleet including battleships Petropavlovsk and Andrei Pervozvanny	c. 1,500

Casualties and losses
unknown	c. 600 mutineers executed after the fall of the fort

The Krasnaya Gorka mutiny broke out at a Russian coastal fort west of Petrograd on the night of 13 June 1919 and was put down by Bolshevik naval and ground forces four days later. The mutineers held Fort Krasnaya Gorka and two neighbouring forts on the Gulf of Finland. Their plan was to turn the heavy guns against the Red defences of Petrograd and Kronstadt and to clear a path for Nikolai Yudenich's Northwestern Army into the city.

On the night of 12-13 June the fort commander, Nikolai Neklyudov, arrested the Bolshevik commissars in the garrison and shot them. The neighbouring forts of Seraya Loshad ("Grey Horse") and Obruchev joined in over the next day. Neklyudov radioed Walter Cowan's British Royal Navy squadron in the Gulf of Finland for help, and opened fire on the Red ships and on Kronstadt with the fort's 12-inch guns.

The Bolshevik response was fast. Joseph Stalin happened to be in Petrograd already, sent by Moscow that May to steady the front. He pulled in the Red Baltic Fleet. For two days the battleships Petropavlovsk and Andrei Pervozvanny shelled the fort with more than 600 twelve-inch rounds. The 7th Army pushed infantry up the coast. On 16 June Red soldiers walked into an empty Krasnaya Gorka. The British squadron, with no orders to land men on Russian soil, never moved. Most mutineers slipped across the Finnish border or into Yudenich's lines. Around 600 of those caught were shot.

From the late 1920s Soviet historians turned the episode into one of the founding myths of the Stalin cult. Mikheil Chiaureli's 1951 film The Unforgettable Year 1919 put the fictional version on screen. Post-Soviet writers have toned Stalin's part down and given more weight to Grigory Zinoviev, the Petrograd Soviet apparatus, and the Baltic Fleet command.

== Background ==
By the spring of 1919 the Russian Civil War had reached Petrograd's outer approaches. Yudenich's Northwestern Army was based in Estonia and backed by Estonian, Finnish and British troops. Its first offensive opened in May 1919, aimed at the former imperial capital. In the Gulf of Finland, Walter Cowan's Royal Navy squadron supported the move, and Lieutenant Augustus Agar's Coastal Motor Boats ran raids against the Red Baltic Fleet's bases.

The fort itself dated from 1914. The Tsarist navy had built it to cover the seaward approach to Petrograd from the south. Four 12-inch guns and several 8-inch pieces sat on the position. Across the Gulf, Fort Obruchev mirrored it. Fort Seraya Loshad sat next door on the same shore. Between the three forts, any ship steering for Petrograd or Kronstadt came under fire. The 1919 garrison was a mix of former imperial gunners, sailors and reservists. A Bolshevik commissar staff handled political loyalty. Food was short by June, and Yudenich's troops were close.

== The mutiny ==
The mutiny began on the night of 12-13 June. A group of officers led by the fort commander, Nikolai Neklyudov, seized control and arrested the senior Communists in the garrison. The commissar and the others were shot the following morning. Neklyudov sent two radio messages, one to Cowan's squadron at sea and one to Yudenich's headquarters in Estonia. The fort had risen against Soviet power and was asking for help.

The revolt spread along the coast inside a day. Fort Seraya Loshad joined within hours. Fort Obruchev declared for the mutineers on 14 June. The fort's guns then opened fire on Red Baltic Fleet ships off Kronstadt and on the harbour itself.

Cowan's squadron received Neklyudov's radio call but had no orders to land men on Russian soil. Yudenich's headquarters did not learn of the mutiny until 15 June. By then the Bolshevik counter-attack was already in motion.

== Suppression ==
Stalin had reached Petrograd in mid-May 1919. The Central Committee had sent him in to steady the front. His weeks there ran on coordination with Zinoviev at the Petrograd Soviet and with the Baltic Fleet command. The mutiny news caught him on 13 June. By the same evening he had wired Vladimir Lenin for authority to crush it by any means.

The plan paired naval bombardment with a land assault. The two battleships fired through 14 and 15 June, putting more than 600 twelve-inch rounds onto the fort. From the east, the 7th Army worked infantry up along the coast. By dawn on 16 June the garrison had given up the position and was heading overland for the Finnish border. Red Army troops walked in to find the fort empty later that day.

Most of the active mutineers got out, either across the Finnish border or into Yudenich's lines. Of those captured, several hundred were tried summarily and shot. Modern estimates put the number of executions at around 600.

Stalin's telegram to Lenin on 16 June declared that "the swift capture of Krasnaya Gorka and the impending capture of Seraya Loshad" had been the work of a combined operation of the Baltic Fleet and the 7th Army.

== Aftermath ==
With the forts back in Bolshevik hands the immediate threat to Kronstadt was gone. Yudenich's first offensive lost momentum within days. By the end of June 1919 the Northwestern Army had been pushed back to its starting line on the Estonian frontier. A second, bigger offensive in October 1919 reached the suburbs of Petrograd before it was beaten.

The handling of the mutiny set the pattern for later anti-Soviet revolts inside Red Army units. The Kronstadt rebellion of March 1921 at the neighbouring fortress was suppressed with the same combination of naval bombardment and overland assault. In the weeks after Krasnaya Gorka, several thousand officers and former imperial officers in the Petrograd garrison were arrested as part of a wider purge.

== Memory and historiography ==
Official Soviet historiography from the late 1920s gave Stalin almost all the credit for the suppression. Robert Service has called the Krasnaya Gorka episode one of the foundation stories of the Stalin cult. School textbooks, party histories and authorised biographies used it to cast the future general secretary as the saviour of Petrograd. The 1951 socialist-realist film The Unforgettable Year 1919 by Mikheil Chiaureli put a fictional Stalin (played by Mikheil Gelovani) on the bridge of the battleship directing the bombardment in person.

Post-Soviet scholarship has reset the balance. Evan Mawdsley and Jonathan Smele credit the operational decisions to the Baltic Fleet command and the 7th Army staff. Richard Pipes has stressed the role of Zinoviev's Petrograd Soviet apparatus. Nikolai Kornatovsky's classic 1929 study The Struggle for Red Petrograd remains the standard reference for the operational detail, despite the political frame it was written in.

== See also ==
- Bibliography of the Russian Revolution and Civil War
- Outline of the Russian Revolution and Civil War
- Index of articles related to the Russian Revolution and Civil War
- The "Russian" Civil Wars, 1916–1926: Ten Years That Shook the World
- Russia in Flames: War, Revolution, Civil War, 1914–1921
- Russia in Revolution: An Empire in Crisis, 1890 to 1928
- Russia: Revolution and Civil War, 1917—1921
- The Russian Revolution: A New History
- Russian Civil War
- Northwestern Army (Russia)
- Kronstadt rebellion
- British campaign in the Baltic (1918–1919)
- Yaroslavl Uprising
- Krasnaya Gorka fort
