= Katerynoslav March =

Campaign 1918–19 in the Ukrainian War of Independence

- Part of Anti-Hetman Uprising, Ukrainian War of Independence and Southern Front of the Russian Civil War
Date	27 November 1918 – 2 January 1919
Location	Katerynoslav and Taurida, Ukraine
Result	Successful transfer of Ukrainian State Armed Forces from Katerynoslav to Crimea: Armed Forces of Ukrainian State integrated into the Volunteer Army.

Belligerents
(South Russia (1919–1920)) White movement Ukrainian State	Ukrainian People's Republic Makhnovshchina

Commanders and leaders
(South Russia (1919–1920)) Ignatiy Vasilchenko	Symon Petliura; Nykyfor Hryhoriv (Makhnovshchina) Nestor Makhno

Units involved
8th Katerynoslav Corps: 850 infantry; 170 cavalry; 4 armored cars	(Ukrainian People's Republic) Ukrainian People's Army (Makhnovshchina) Revolutionary Insurgent Army of Ukraine

The Katerynoslav March (27 November 1918 – 2 January 1919) was a campaign to transfer the 8th Corps of the Armed Forces of the Ukrainian State from Katerynoslav to Crimea, in order to join the Volunteer Army of Anton Denikin.

== History ==
=== Beginnings ===
In the days of Pavlo Skoropadskyi's fall from power, the 8th Hetman Corps resolved to join the Volunteer Army. On 23 November 1918, armed clashes between the corps and units of Petliura's Ukrainian People's Army (UPA) took place, as a result of which Katerynoslav remained in the hands of volunteers. However, the situation around the city continued to remain unsafe for the troops defending it. The corps leadership decided to flee south to the Crimea in order to join with the rest of Denikin's army. On the night of 27–28 November 1918, a detachment ventured south from Katerynoslav, led by General Ignatiy Vasilchenko, and his chief of staff, Colonel I.G. Konovalov. Petliura's forces, in turn, occupied the city. On 22 December 1918, UPA troops dissolved the Katerynoslav councils, then on 26 December they disarmed the Bolshevik military revolutionary headquarters and attacked the local Bolshevik detachments.

The nascent Ukrainian People's Republic subsequently proposed an alliance with the Makhnovshchina, which was rejected due to the "bourgeois nationalist" character of the Directorate.

The volunteer detachment, when leaving Katerynoslav, held over a thousand people in its ranks. It was based on the 43rd and 44th Infantry Regiments (300-400 people), the Katerynoslav volunteer squad (about 250 people), as well as the 7th Cavalry Novorossiysk Regiment (about 150-170 sabers). In addition, the detachment included an armored section of 4 vehicles, artillery, a radio station, an engineering platoon and an infirmary. Most of the participants in the campaign were officers.

=== The march ===
For 34 days, the detachment fought over about 500 kilometres. Due to the impossibility of moving through the impassable autumn mud, as well as due to the lack of fuel, part of the armored vehicles was blown up at the very beginning of the campaign. Due to the impossibility of moving directly to Rostov-on-Don to the locations of the main forces of the Volunteer Army, due to the deployment on the route of the Makhnovist and Petliura troops, the detachment decided to move along the right bank of the Dnieper in the direction of Perekop. Breaking through the encirclement, the detachment fought a battle with the Petliurists on 29 November near the German colony of Noienburg (Malyshivka), followed by bloody battles with the Makhnovists on 10 December in the Marinka and Novovorontsovka raions, and on 11 December near Dudchyne. On 13 December, near Beryslav, a large battle took place with the formations of Nykyfor Hryhoriv over control of the Dnieper crossing. One of the leaders of the Katerynoslav campaign, General P. G. Kyslyi, was wounded in the battle.

On 27 December 1918, under the disguise of a commuter train, Nestor Makhno's Revolutionary Insurgent Army of Ukraine launched an attack on Katerynoslav, capturing it from the Petliurist forces, who retook the city only a few days later.

=== Results ===
In the last days of December 1918, the Katerynoslav detachment, led by General H. M. Vasylchenko, having lost some of its personnel during the fighting, arrived in Perekop. In early January 1919, the Katerynoslav volunteers were sent to Dzhankoi, and then on to Simferopol.

On the basis of the detachment from Katerynoslav, the command of the Volunteer Army formed the 4th Infantry Division of General Korvin-Krukovsky, the 34th Artillery Brigade and the Novorossiysk Cavalry Regiment. The headquarters of General Vasylchenko became part of the headquarters of the Crimean-Azov army of General Aleksandr. A. Borovsky. On 6 June 1920, a special insignia was established for the participants of the campaign. The Katerynoslav campaign by its nature has much in common with the Drozdov campaign in the spring of 1918 and the Starobilsk campaign of the same time.

== See also ==
- Bibliography of the Russian Revolution and Civil War
- Outline of the Russian Revolution and Civil War
- Index of articles related to the Russian Revolution and Civil War
- The "Russian" Civil Wars, 1916–1926: Ten Years That Shook the World
- Russia in Flames: War, Revolution, Civil War, 1914–1921
- Russia in Revolution: An Empire in Crisis, 1890 to 1928
- Russia: Revolution and Civil War, 1917—1921
- The Russian Revolution: A New History

== Bibliography ==
- Omelyanovich-Pavlenko, M. (2007). Спогади командарма (1917-1920) (in Ukrainian). Kyiv: Tempora.
- Gureev, A. (1964). Екатеринославский поход (in Russian). Sentry.
- К 80-летию Екатеринославского похода (in Russian). Vol. 12. Dvoryanskiy Vestnik. 1998. p. 2.
- Volkov, Sergey Vladimirovich (2004). Энциклопедия Гражданской войны (in Russian). Moscow.
