= Battle of Barnaul (1918) =

Russian Civil War from 13 to 15, June 1918

Coordinates: 53°21′57.61″N 83°45′00.30″E

- Part of the Eastern Front of the Russian Civil War
Date	June 13–15, 1918
Location	Barnaul
Result	White victory

Belligerents
(Russian Soviet Federative Socialist Republic) Red Guards; Hungarians	Siberian Army; Czechoslovaks

Commanders and leaders
(Russian Soviet Federative Socialist Republic) Ivan Prisyagin (Russian Soviet Federative Socialist Republic) Matvey Tsaplin (Russian Soviet Federative Socialist Republic) Nikolay Malyukov	Sergeev; Travin; Karel Gusarek

Strength
(Russian Soviet Federative Socialist Republic) 2,000; 200	1,000; 400; Armoured train

Casualties and losses
160	50

The Battle of Barnaul was a series of engagements from 13 June to 15 June 1918, during the Russian Civil War. The battle involved several; different factions in the Siberian region. The Red Guards and White movement were the main combatants.

== Background ==
After the outbreak of the October Revolution of 1917, the Czechoslovak Legion launched their own uprising. This Czechoslovak army, under the leadership of Radola Gajda, aimed to capture the Trans-Siberian Railway to secure safe passage in their goal of seizing Russian territories along the railway from the Volga to the Pacific. As the Czechoslovaks moved in, the Russian officers' organizations also overthrew the Bolsheviks in Petropavlovsk and Omsk. These factions joined forces with the White movement.

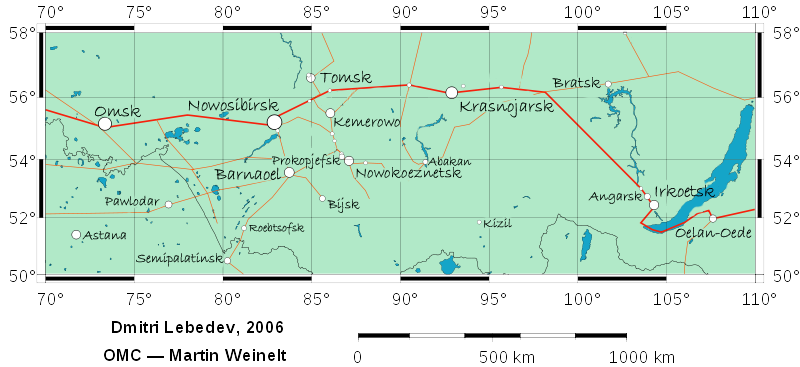
Novonikolaevsk changed its name to "Novosibirsk" at 1926

A crucial target of the White's campaign was the city of Novonikolaevsk, which was a node where Altai Railway (part of future Turkestan–Siberia Railway) connected to the Trans-Siberian Railway. The Whites captured Novonikolaevsk during the night of May, 25–26. The following day civilians, former soldiers, and officers began to organize anti-Bolsheviks detachments.

News of the revolt reached the Red Guards stationed in the city of Barnaul and an offensive was organized to recapture the city. They imposed martial law on the whole Altai Railway line, made Altayskaya station its capital, and proceeded to meet attackers near the Cherepanovo.

In response, the White Army - through the Provisional Government of Autonomous Siberia - created on June 1 a Siberian Army composed of volunteers and former officers. Their mission was the recapture Altai Railway. Three days later, the White forces left Novonikolaevsk and began to move south.

On June 5, the Red Guards' train left Cherepanovo and began to move north. The two trains carrying the opposing forces met near the Evsino station. After some shots, the Reds began to flee, destroying roads and bridges as they retreated.

On June 8, the Whites tried to cross the Chumysh River, but had to retreat under the fire of the Reds. The Whites decided to cross the river by nightfall under the cloak of darkness to cover the Red Guards' escape routes since the plan was to strike them from the front and rear.

On June 9, the Reds received information about the Whites in their rear area. In the evening, a team of the Reds stealthily attacked the Whites' column, which was in the process of encircling the Reds' position. At first the Reds' attack was successful, but as the Whites counterattacked, they suffered losses and had to retreat to the Altayskaya station.

On June 10, members of Barnaul Revolution Committee came to the Altayskaya. They organized a meeting with the local population and explained the necessity of keeping such an important railway station. The Red Guards with the help of the local population began to dig tranches near the bridge over the Chesnokovka River.

The Whites, however, were able to instigate a revolt within Barnaul so that, on June 11, the Red Guards had to leave the trenches and return to the city to suppress it. Whites from the Novonikolaevsk captured Altayskaya without a fight on June 12. There they found a map of Barnaul and its surroundings. By this time, the army received word that a reinforcement of 200 men on a ship that sailed from Novonikolaevsk was underway under the command of colonel A.A.Budkevich.

== The Battle at Barnaul ==
Reds fortified the bridge over the Ob River, which connected Barnaul and the railway station. To do this, they had to destroy a part of the bridge near the station and placed a barricade with machine gun on the other end. The Red Guards took their position on the right bank of the Ob river (where Barnaul is located) due to its elevation. Whites decided not to storm the bridge and began to use cannons instead. The army's commanders then decided to cross the river in another location. During the night of June, 13–14, a company of soldiers crossed the Ob river at 20 km north-west of Barnaul near the Gonba village. They then joined Budkevich's reinforcent as well as the detachment of Barnaul rebels, who retreated from the city to the Vlasikha village. On the evening of June 14, Barnaul was attacked from the all directions. The Reds did not have enough ammunition, hence they decided to leave the city and evacuated to Aleysk.

== Aftermath ==
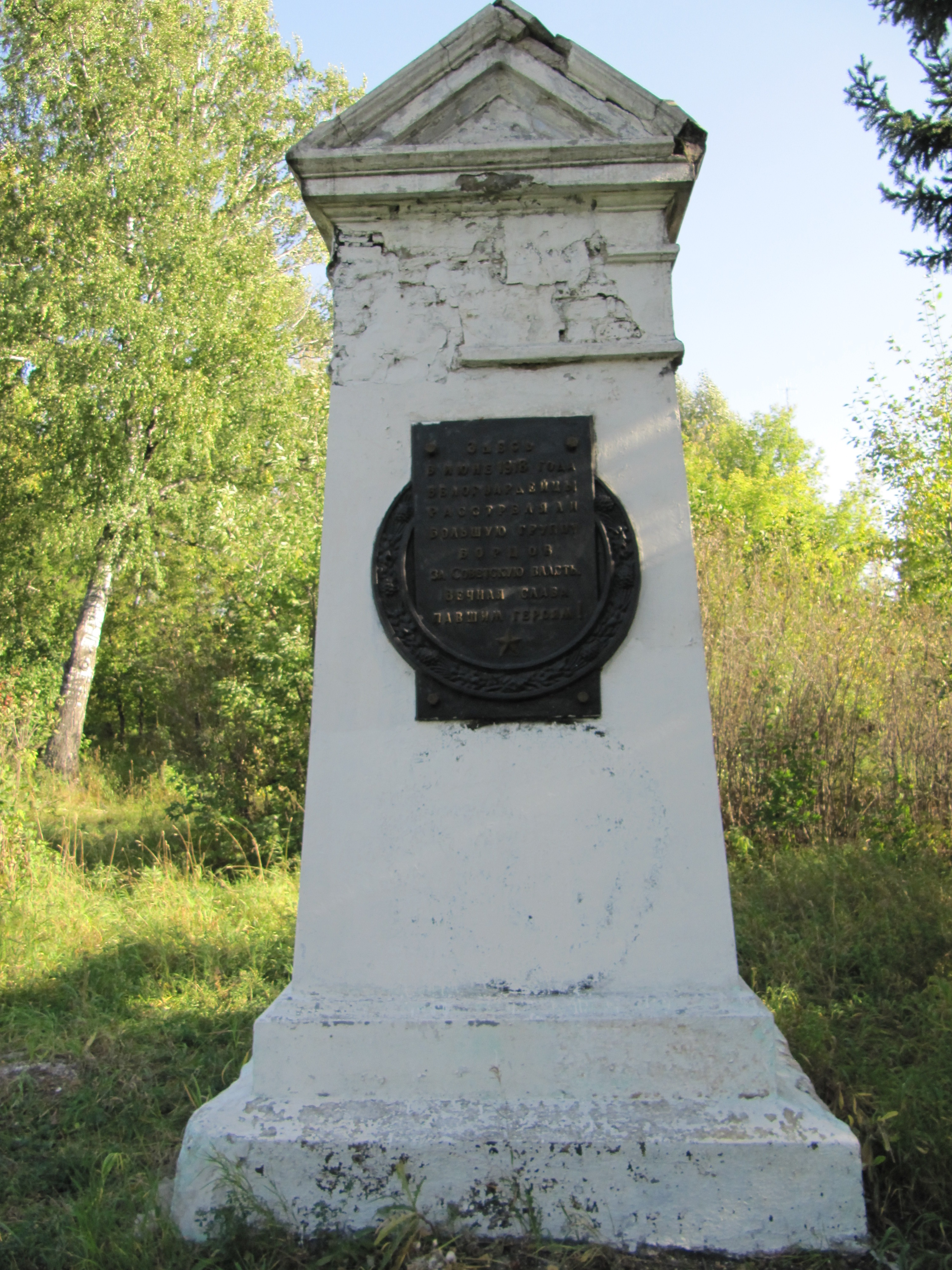
A monument in Barnaul in memory of Red Guardsmen, killed by Whites in 1918

Whites captured about 200 Red Guards after the Battle of Barnaul and, on the next day, killed all Reds of Hungarian nationality.

Those Reds, who retreated from Barnaul to Aleysk, united into one partisan detachment under the command of P.F. Sukhov. This detachment fought in White's rear area for two months before suffering a crushing defeat.

By 1920, a Red Guard officer assessed the success of the White movement in Barnaul, highlighting fundamental mistakes in the policy formulated in Moscow. In a telegram protesting this development, the missive stated that the negligence "alienated from us the poorest part of the middle peasants and the poor peasants," strengthening the position of the enemy.

== See also ==
- Bibliography of the Russian Revolution and Civil War
- Outline of the Russian Revolution and Civil War
- Index of articles related to the Russian Revolution and Civil War
- The "Russian" Civil Wars, 1916–1926: Ten Years That Shook the World
- Russia in Flames: War, Revolution, Civil War, 1914–1921
- Russia in Revolution: An Empire in Crisis, 1890 to 1928
- Russia: Revolution and Civil War, 1917—1921
- The Russian Revolution: A New History
