= Manych Operation (1919) =

Campaign of the Russian Civil War

- Part of Russian Civil War
Date	April–May 1919
Location	southern part of Don Host Oblast
Result	White victory

Belligerents
South Russia	Russian SFSR

Commanders and leaders
Anton Denikin	Alexander Yegorov

Manych operation was a military action in the North Caucasus during the Russian Civil War in April–May 1919.

== Politico-military situation ==
During the counter-offensive of the Southern Front, which began in February 1919, the 10th Army of the Red Army captured almost the entire Salsky District of the Don Host Oblast and reached the southern bank of the Manych River near the village of Velikokoknyazheskaya. This offensive in the direction of the Manych River was aimed at the flank and rear of the grouping of troops defending Rostov-on-Don, which consisted of the Volunteer Army and Don corps. On the river Manych, the offensive of the 10th Army in April 1919 was stopped due to stubborn resistance of the enemy.

Denikin's Volunteer Army, meanwhile, having taken the offensive in the Donbass, intensified its actions in the Don region, came to the Manych and fought for the crossings.

== Bibliography ==
- Будённый С. М. (1958). [militera.lib.ru/memo/russian/budenny_sm/index.html Пройдённый путь. Книга первая]. М.: Воениздат.
- Деникин А. И. [militera.lib.ru/memo/Russian/denikin_ai2/index.html Очерки русской смуты.] — М.: Айрис-пресс, 2006. — ISBN 5-8112-1891-5
- Егоров А.И. [militera.lib.ru/h/egorov_ai/index.html Гражданская война в России: Разгром Деникина] — М.: ООО «Издательство ACT», 2003. — 640 с. ISBN 5-17-015247-7
- Гражданская война в СССР: В 2-х т. Т.2./ Под ред. Н.Н. Азовцева. М.: Воениздат. 1980–1986.

== See also ==
- Bibliography of the Russian Revolution and Civil War
- Outline of the Russian Revolution and Civil War
- Index of articles related to the Russian Revolution and Civil War
- The "Russian" Civil Wars, 1916–1926: Ten Years That Shook the World
- Russia in Flames: War, Revolution, Civil War, 1914–1921
- Russia in Revolution: An Empire in Crisis, 1890 to 1928
- Russia: Revolution and Civil War, 1917—1921
- The Russian Revolution: A New History
