= Siberia To-day =

1919 account of Allied intervention in Russian Civil War

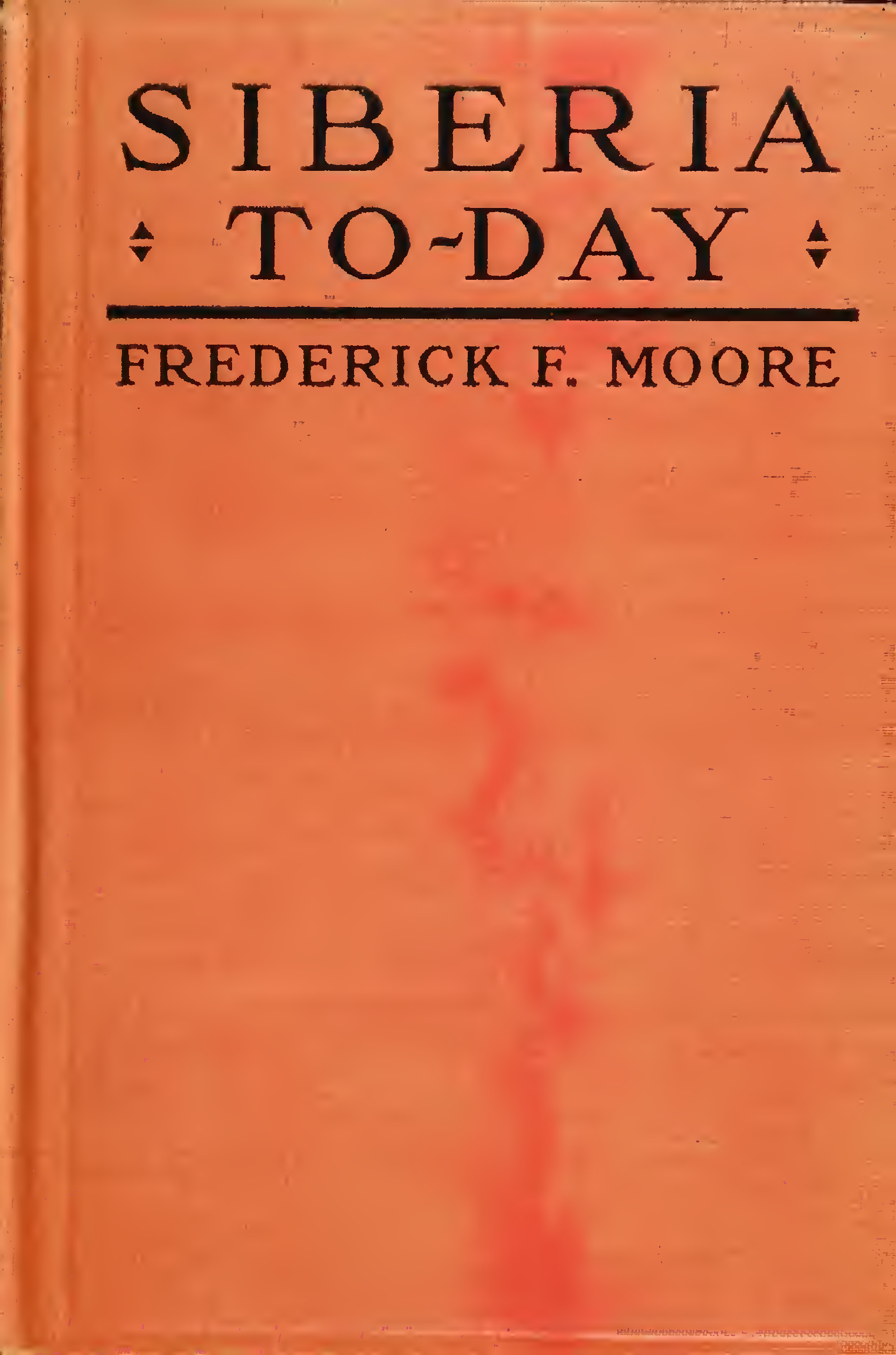
- Author: Frederick Ferdinand Moore
- Illustrator: Donald C. Thomson
- Language: English
- Genre: non-fiction
- Publisher: D. Appleton & Company
- Publication date: 1919
- Pages: 334
- OCLC: 2979400
- LC Class: 19019482

Siberia To-day is a first-hand account of the Allied intervention in the Russian Civil War by intelligence officer Frederick Ferdinand Moore published in 1919. The book provides a rare insight into life in Siberia during the winter of 1918–19 under the rule of the Cossacks at a time when the Bolsheviks were rising and helped shape US policy in Russia at the time. The book continues to serve as a reference to the region at the time.

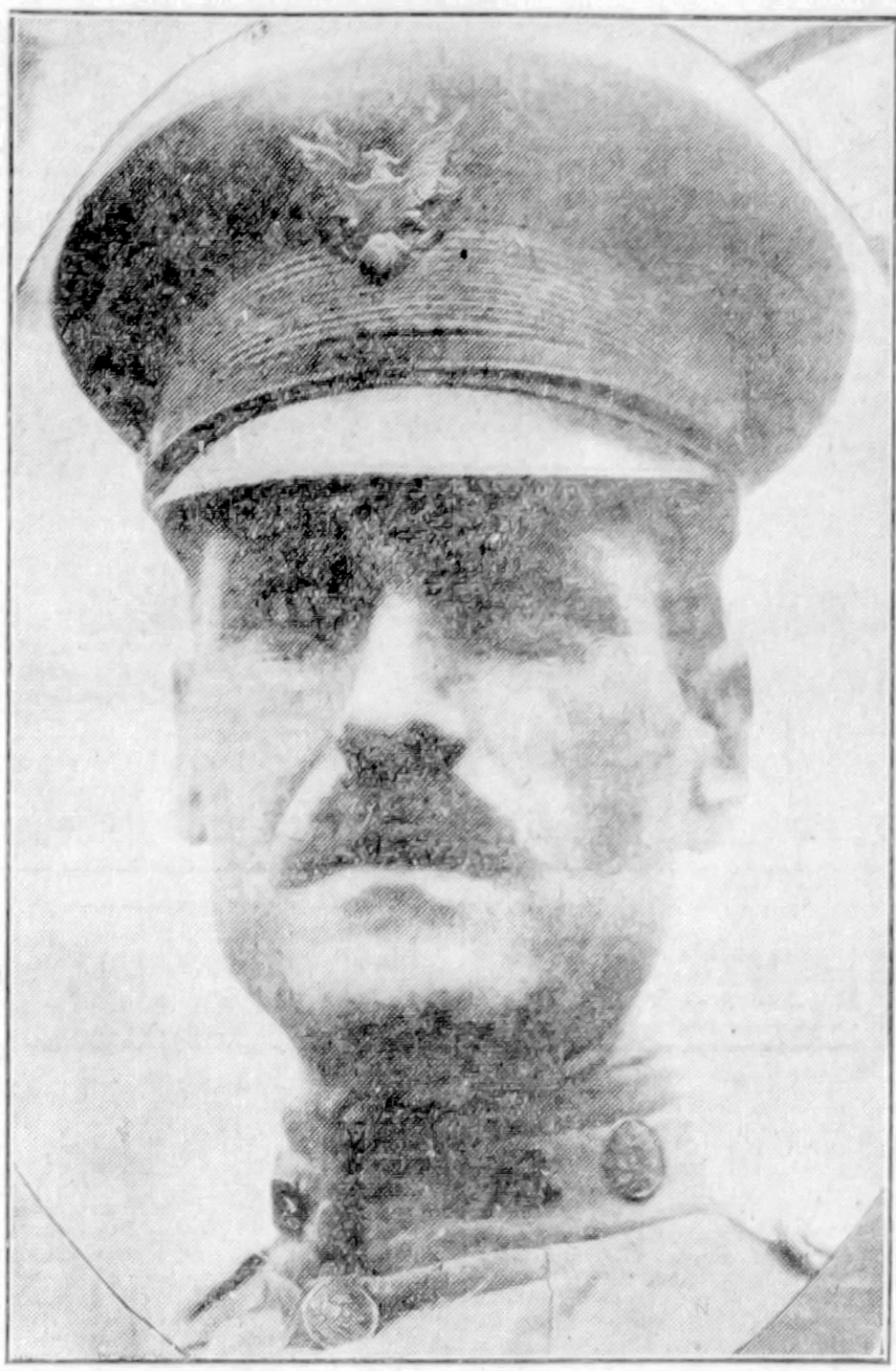
Frederick Ferdinand Moore in Vladivostok 1919. Photo: Donald C. Thompson

The book documents Moore's experience as a captain in the Intelligence Division of the American Expeditionary Force in Siberia. Moore, a war correspondent during the Russo-Japanese War, arrived in Vladivostok in September 1918 and departed in March 1919. He was stationed in Chita and had numerous encounters with Grigory Mikhaylovich Semyonov, the ataman of Baikal Cossacks. Moore documents at length several alcohol-fuelled official gatherings in Chita.

In his preface, Moore states "this is not a 'war book,' nor an account of thrilling deeds, nor a history of our expedition in Siberia, but a book in which I have attempted to bring to the public a realization of the difficulties under which our officers and men performed, and perform, their duties in that land."

Moore provides some insights into the local people and admitted that the Siberians exhibited "ignorance, credulity, stupidity, and cruelty"; yet he believed "that the only hope Russia has for regeneration, no matter how long it may take to do the work, lies in the peasant class."

Moore illustrates how Bolshevism is spread via "trifles", little bits of seemingly unimportant details which were disseminated via numerous innocuous channels.

Moore concludes by opining that the American mission to Siberia was ill-fated as it did not have a firm policy toward the various factions which were vying for supremacy. He suggested that this ambivalence created an environment where the United States was disliked by both the Bolsheviki and anti-Bolsheviki alike.

== Critical review ==
At the time of its release, the book was generally lauded for its insights into life in Siberia rather than an historical account of the times.

New-York Tribune: "The book is impressionistic, rather than historical; the author only incidentally mentions the political and military events that took place during his sojourn. He relates his experiences with spirit and vividness."

Evening Star: "A full experience, keen observation, a good background of political and military knowledge to give value to impressions meet the spirit manner of this writer to form a highly informing and interesting study of the Siberian situation."

San Francisco Chronicle: "Moore's book is interesting, though, of course, all he saw of Siberia was railroad towns and what was visible from right of ways. But he does not pretend to describe anything more, and he found plenty of incident to use."

Indianapolis News: "Amid all the tangle of reports and discussions on the Russian situation, it is a pleasure to come upon such a clear, concise and interesting book as "Siberia Today."
