= Frederick Ferdinand Moore =

American novelist (1881–1947)

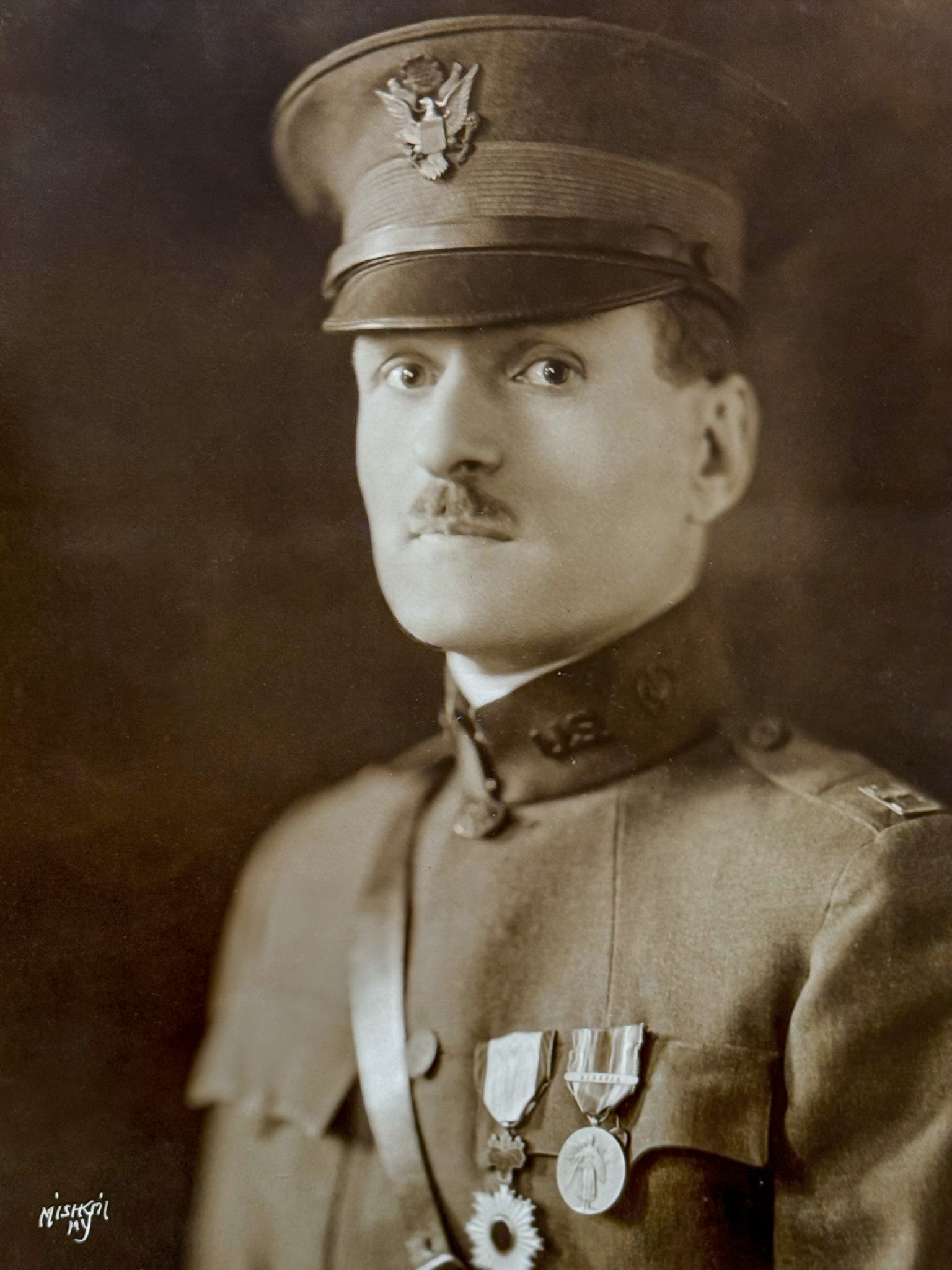
- Captain Frederick Ferdinand Moore ca 1922 by Herman Mishkin
- Born: December 24, 1881; Concord, New Hampshire
- Died: 16 January 1947 (aged 65); Los Angeles, California
- Occupation: Writer
- Spouses: Florence Raymond Frisbee (1906-1914) (divorced); Eleanor Gates (1914-16) (annulled)
- Children: Marjorie Moore
- Writing career
- Genres: Adventure, military, pulp fiction
- Notable works: The Devil's Admiral; Siberia To-day; The Samovar Girl
- Notable awards: Japanese Order of the Rising Sun

Frederick Ferdinand Moore (24 December 1881 – 16 January 1947) was an early 20th century American novelist, short story writer, editor, publisher, soldier and war correspondent. His first novel The Devil's Admiral was inspired by his extensive travels as a sailor, a soldier serving in the US Army during the Philippine–American War, and later as a correspondent covering the Russo-Japanese War.

As a captain in the US Army he was an intelligence officer in the American Expeditionary Force, Siberia, and was awarded the Order of the Rising Sun 5th Class by the Japanese government. He documented his first-hand experience witnessing the rise of the Bolsheviks in Siberia To-day, a text which remained as a key reference to the region for several decades after it was published.

Moore's marriage and subsequent annulment to Eleanor Gates, playwright and author of The Poor Little Rich Girl, drew significant media attention.

Moore later became a deputy marshal with the Los Angeles County Sheriff's Department and was murdered while on duty in 1947. Despite prolonged searches, his remains were never found.

== Early days ==
Moore was born on 24 December 1881 in Concord, New Hampshire, the eldest of four children of James Bell Moore, an Irishman who was born in Stalybridge, England, and Nellie C. Collins of Ireland. The Moore family lived in Enfield, New Hampshire. As a boy, Moore worked in a woolen mill in Enfield as a weaver. In order to study while weaving he would fasten a book to the loom and read when the weaving did not require his attention. Moore was enrolled in Boston College in 1897 but it appears he left within a few months.

According to The New York Times, Moore "ran away to sea when he was 15, as a seagoing cowpuncher in a cattleboat bound for Liverpool. For 10 or 12 years after that he roamed the world by sea routes as sailor, soldier and newspaper correspondent." Canadian-American writer H. Bedford-Jones shared a similar account of Moore's youth: "Trooper, as he was called, had a master's license in sail – captain, to you. He was in ... the Philippine Insurrection, ... In the Russo-Japan War he was a correspondent."

Moore claims he circumnavigated the world three times by tramp steamers while still in his teens. He felt he was destined to become a sea captain, but after reading Kipling and the sinking of the Maine in 1898 he recognized that "the defence of his country was more alluring than the chance of a captain's berth."

== Writing career ==
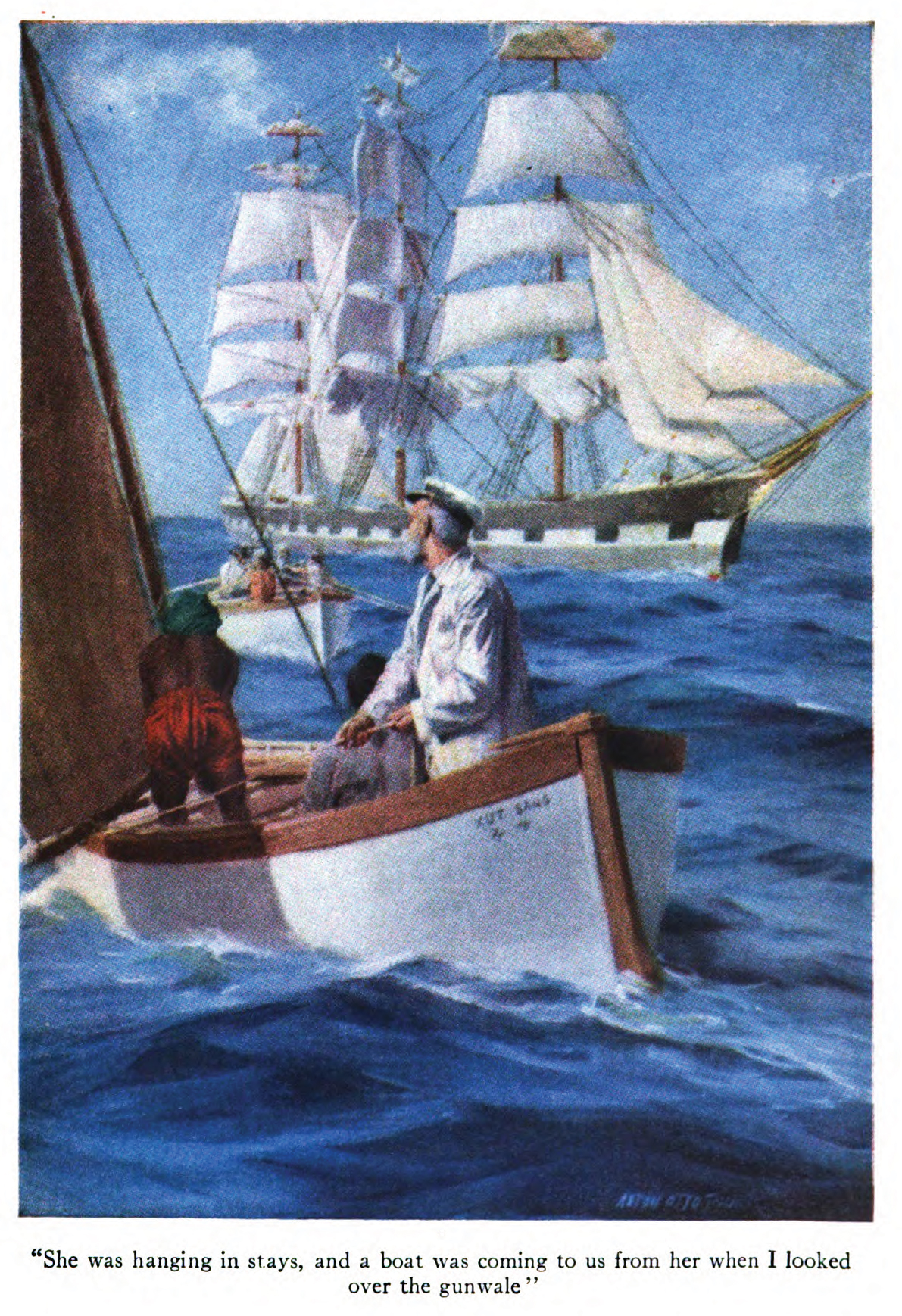
Illustration by Anton Otto Fischer in The Devil's Admiral

Moore's earliest writing appears in the Inter-State Journal and Advertiser based out of White River Junction, Vermont. He wrote a four-part series featuring a fictional character named Delilah Hopkins.

After his discharge in November 1904 from the US Army in Manila, he remained in Asia to cover the Russo-Japanese War as a correspondent. As a correspondent for Hearst's, he filed one of the first reports in May 1905 of the Battle of Tsushima when the Japanese fleet defeated the Russian fleet.

On his return to the United States in 1905, Moore became a reporter and feature writer for the San Francisco Examiner, where he remained until late 1912.

He became the editor of Argosy in New York City in 1913 but appears to have resigned in May 1914 to return to military service. During this time he became a prolific short story writer, drawing largely on his experience in the US Army. His non-fiction essays were widely published. His article entitled "The Vanishing Army of the Bolsheviki" drew global attention within socialist movements.

Moore's best-known and most critically acclaimed work is The Devil's Admiral, published in 1913. The adventure novel about modern-day pirates draws on Moore's experience of sailing in the South China Sea. Moore followed The Devil's Admiral with three other novels: Sailor Girl (1920), Isle O' Dreams (1920) and The Samovar Girl (1921).

Moore was a prolific writer of pulp fiction and penned more than 160 short stories in his career, most frequently with the byline of Captain Frederick Moore. His stories were featured in the "Big Four" of pulp magazines: Argosy, Adventure, Blue Book and Short Stories. The majority of these were stories of the South Seas or military life.

In 1925, Moore established the publication Book Dealers' Weekly, based out of New York.

== Military service ==
Moore enlisted in the US Army in May 1902 and served with Troop H 2nd Cavalry Regiment during the Philippine Insurrection. He declined a commission in 1904 and requested a discharge in Manila in November so that he could report on the Russo-Japanese War.

Moore was promoted to second lieutenant in Battery F of the First Field Artillery of the New York National Guard on 12 November 1913.

He later enlisted in the US Army and as a captain in the Intelligence Division, General Staff, of the American Expeditionary Force, Siberia. He was stationed in Chita and had numerous encounters with Grigory Mikhaylovich Semyonov, the ataman of Baikal Cossacks. Moore was honorably discharged on 17 March 1919. The Emperor of Japan awarded him the Order of the Rising Sun 5th Class for his service as part of the Allied forces in Russia. Moore documented his observations of Allied intervention in the Russian Civil War in his book Siberia To-day and became a widely cited authority on Japanese and Russian relations for many decades to follow.

== Murder ==
In the mid-1940s Moore became a deputy marshal with the Los Angeles County Sheriff's Department. On 16 January 1947, he was assigned to collect a writ of $157 against Mrs. Eleanor Madras, the owner of a Pasadena café. It was the last time Moore was seen alive.

Two days later, police apprehended Edward H. Evans, a 34-year-old former boxer and fight promoter, as a suspect in the murder. In a 17-page confession, Evans admitted to killing Moore. According to Evans, the shooting grew out of an argument between Moore and himself in a Monterey Park café around Christmas. When Moore visited the Pasadena café on 16 January, Evans shot him at 10 pm. Evans admitted to loading Moore's body into Madras's car and driving to an unidentified place, presumably in Kern County.

According to Evans, he buried Moore in a shallow grave and disposed of Moore's pistol as well as his own. He lit the car on fire. Authorities found the burnt-out car but despite massive searches they could not locate Moore's remains.

Evans was declared insane and committed to the Mendocino State Hospital. He was released after serving two years under a corpus delicti clause because Moore's remains had still not been found.

A skull was found in 1957 in the area where Evans allegedly buried Moore, but dental records did not match Moore's.

== Personal ==
Moore married Florence Raymond Frisbee in San Francisco on 25 August 1906, a few months after both experienced the San Francisco fire and earthquake. They had one daughter, Marjorie, born in 1909.

On 18 October 1914, he wed playwright Eleanor Gates, author of The Poor Little Rich Girl, in New Jersey. At the time, Gates had an interlocutory decree of divorce from her husband, Richard Walton Tully, and Moore had a similar decree from his wife. Moore's first wife, Florence, contested the decree of divorce, and as a result Gates annulled her marriage to Moore. Gates claimed that Moore had been an "invalid" for seven years prior to her marriage but her cooking cured him. She said in 1922 that amongst friends they were known as the "Inseparables." The two remained as a couple till the early 1930s.

== Works ==
=== Selected short stories ===
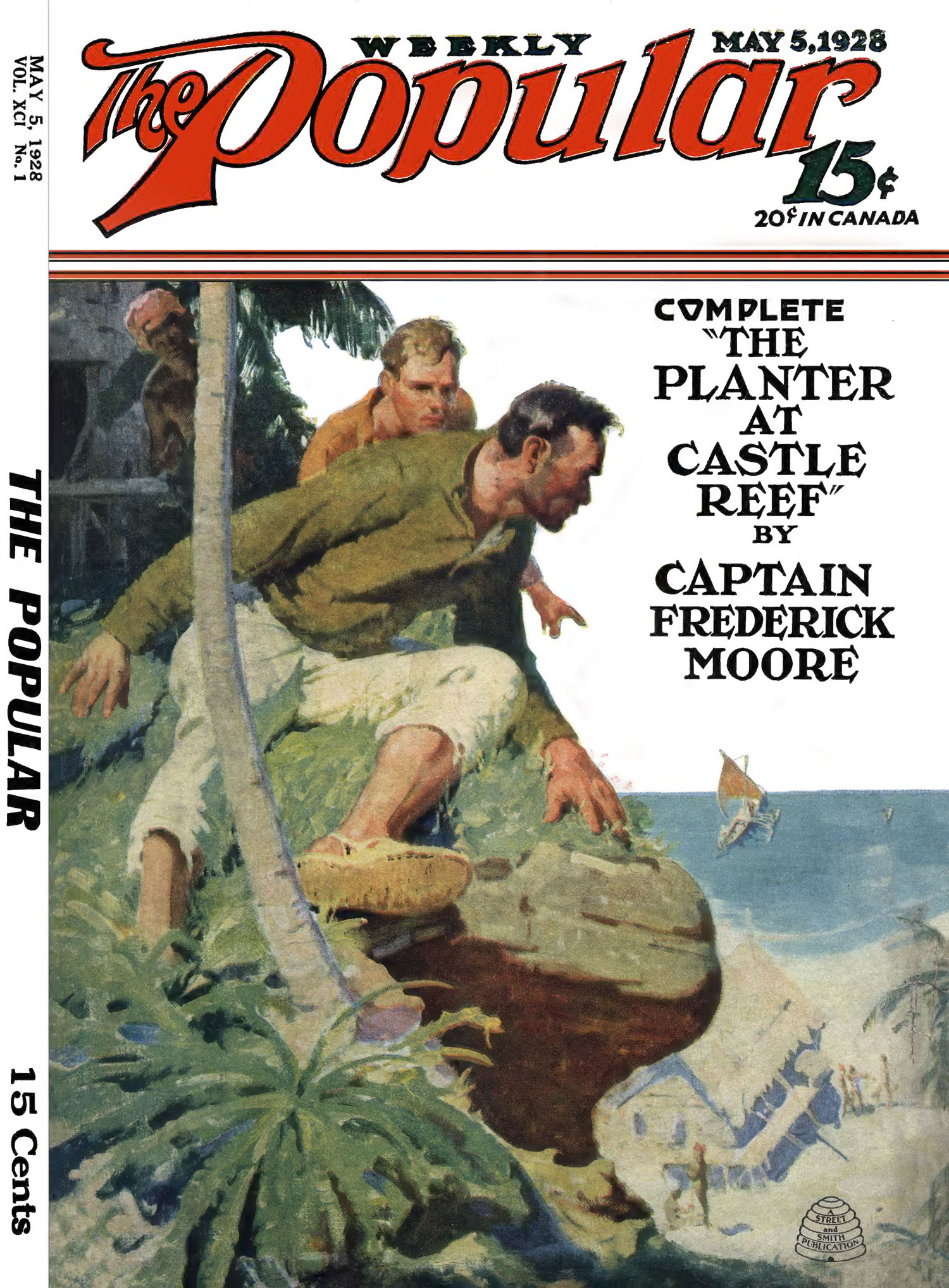
- The Planter at Castle Reef featured on cover of The Popular of May 5, 1928
  1900. "Who 'Lizzy Jane Luzry Wuz" as Told by Delilah Hopkins. Inter-State Journal. 2(1):2–3.
- 1901a. "Just as the Ship Went Down: An Anecdote of the Deep Sea". Inter-State Journal. 3(4):8.
- 1901b. "Mose Barnaby is Afflicted". Inter-State Journal. 2(5):8–10.
- 1901c. "Delilah Hopkins Encounters Cupid". Inter-State Journal. 2(3):9–10.
- 1907. "Emperor by Telegraph". Army and Navy Life. 11(6).
- 1908a. "Three of the Third". The Black Cat. 14(1):28–33.
- 1908b. "The Twenty-One Skeletons". Overland Monthly. 52(4):343–348.
- 1908c. "El Cuchillo". The Black Cat. 13(7):1–11
- 1909a. "The Big Story". McClure's Magazine. 33(4):376–382.
- 1909b. "His First Command". Army and Navy Life. 14(3):267–273.
- 1909c. "Bilibid for Life". Sunset. 23:375–380.
- 1910a. "The Orientalizing of Appleton". Sunset. 25(4):402–405.
- 1910b. "The Eye at the Knot Hole". Sunset. 25(2):143–145.
- 1911. "The 'Busting' of Corporal Kerrigan". Sunset. 27(3):292–300.
- 1918. "The Book-Soldier". Everybody's Magazine. 37(3):25–31, 68.
- 1928. "The Lagoon of the Secret Pearls". Adventure. 65(6):130–179.
- 1928. "The Planter at Castle Reef". A Complete Novel. The Popular. 91(1):1-43.
- 1938. "Pearls at Quarter Moon. Short Stories". 164(1):66-98 (Serial | Part 1 |

=== Shared works with Eleanor Gates ===
Moore and his wife, Eleanor Gates, co-authored numerous short stories and novellas between 1917 and 1924.

- 1917. "The Faithful Woman" Munsey's Magazine. 60(1):115.
- 1922. "Malay Madness" Munsey's Magazine. 76(4):731–768.
- 1923a. "The House of the Wicked" Munsey's Magazine. 80(2):209-. (Four-part serial | Part 1 | Part 2 | Part 3 | Part 4) .
- 1923b. "The Seven Suspected" Adventure. 38(5):3–37.
- 1923c. "Truth on a Spear" The Popular. 67(6):159-175.
- 1924. "Behind the Jungle" A Complete Novelette. The Popular. 73(6): 117–146.

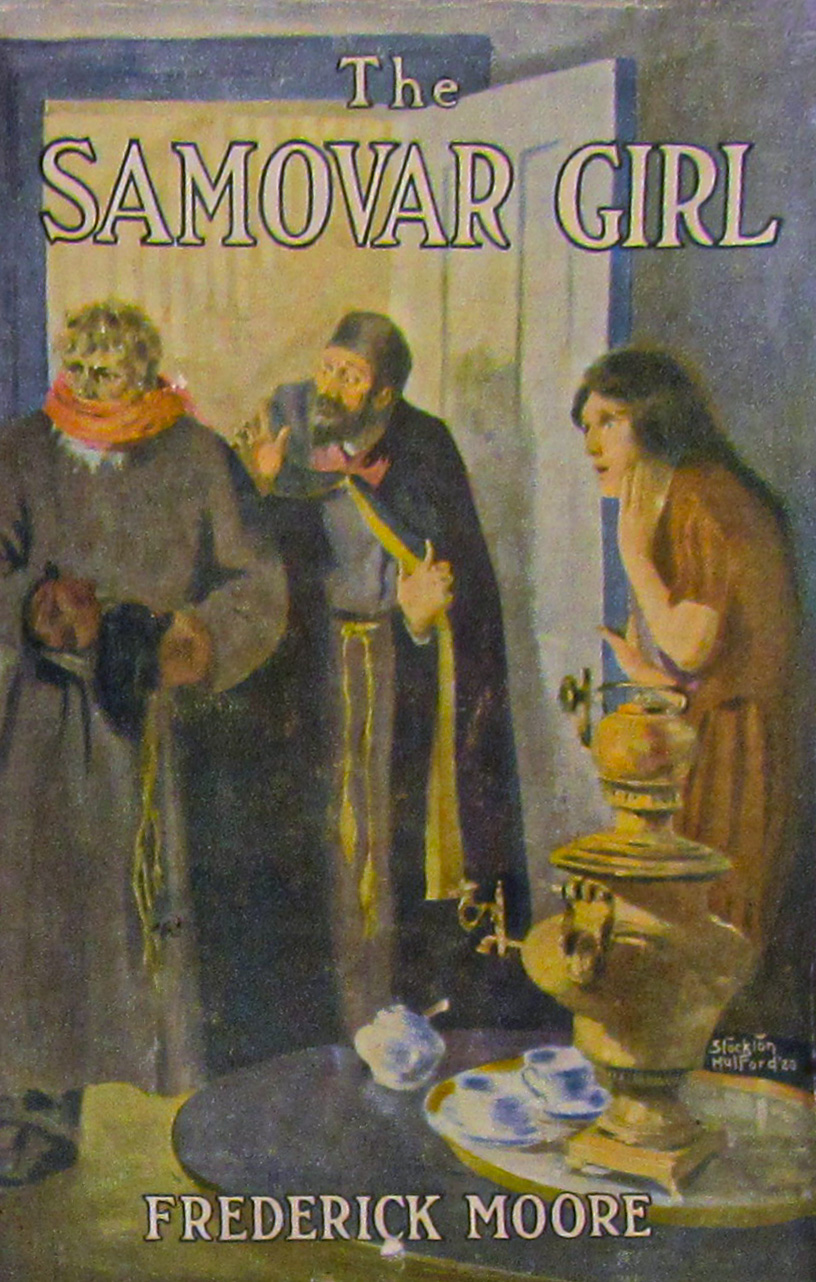
The Samovar Girl (1921)

=== Selected poems ===
- 1921. "The Barrack Braggart" Argosy All-Story Weekly 138(6):858.
- 1937. "The Tropic Maid" Adventure. 96(4):64-65.

=== Selected non-fiction articles ===
- 1916. "A National System of Defense". American Defense. 1(5):142, 152.
- 1919. "Frenzied Finance among the Bolshevists" Leslie's. 128(3324):802, 818, 820
- 1919. "The Vanishing Army of the Bolsheviki". Hearst's Magazine. June:30, 73.

=== Books ===
- 1913. The Devil's Admiral. Garden City, N.Y.: Doubleday, Page & Company
- 1919. Siberia To-day. Non-fiction. New York: D. Appleton and Company
- 1920. Sailor Girl. New York: D. Appleton and Company
- 1920. Isle O' Dreams. New York: Doubleday, Page & Company
- 1921. The Samovar Girl. New York: D. Appleton and Company

== Gallery ==
Cover Stories by Frederick Ferdinand Moore
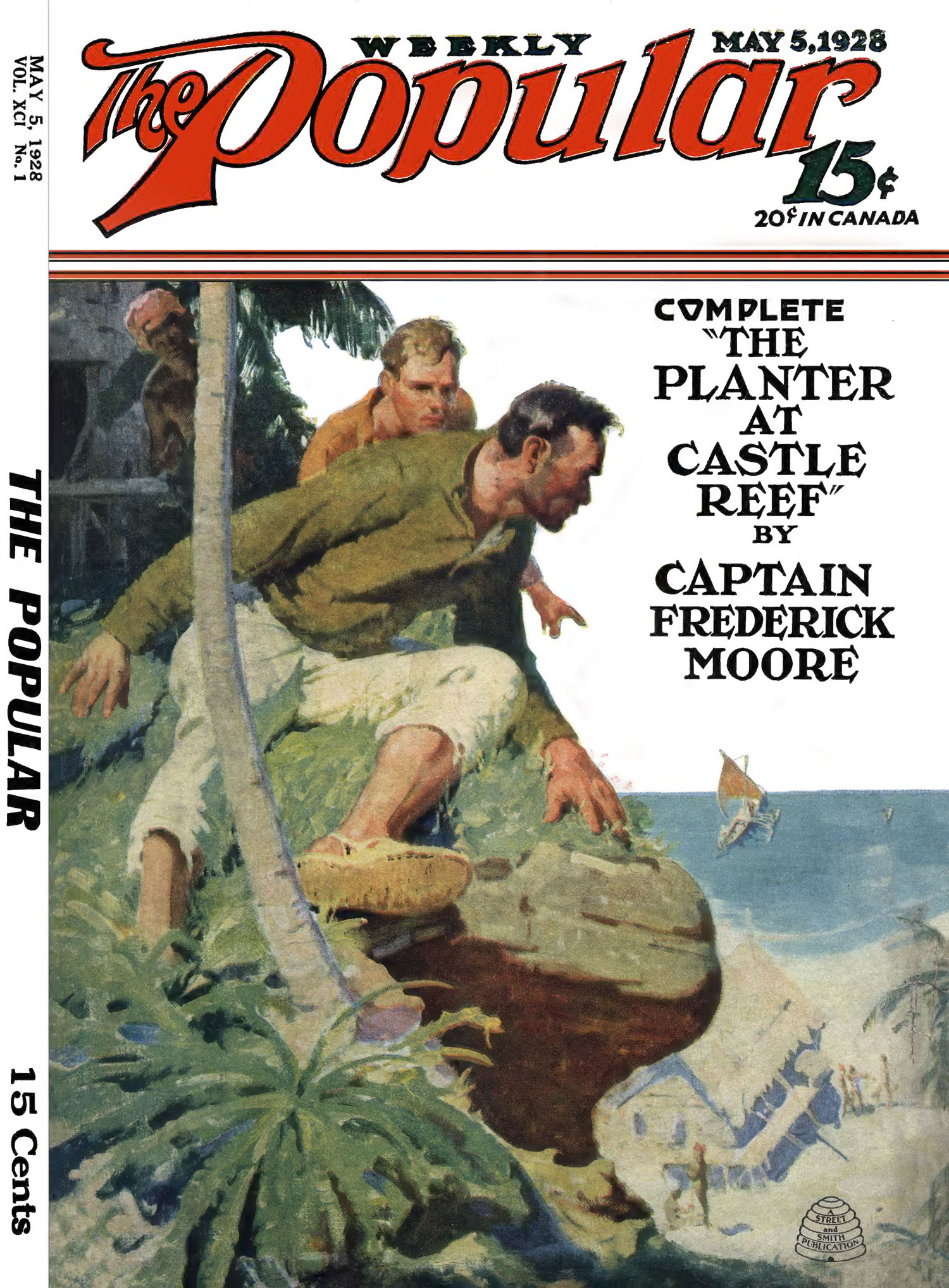
"The Planter at Castle Reef" was the cover story in the May 5, 1928 issue of The Popular Magazine

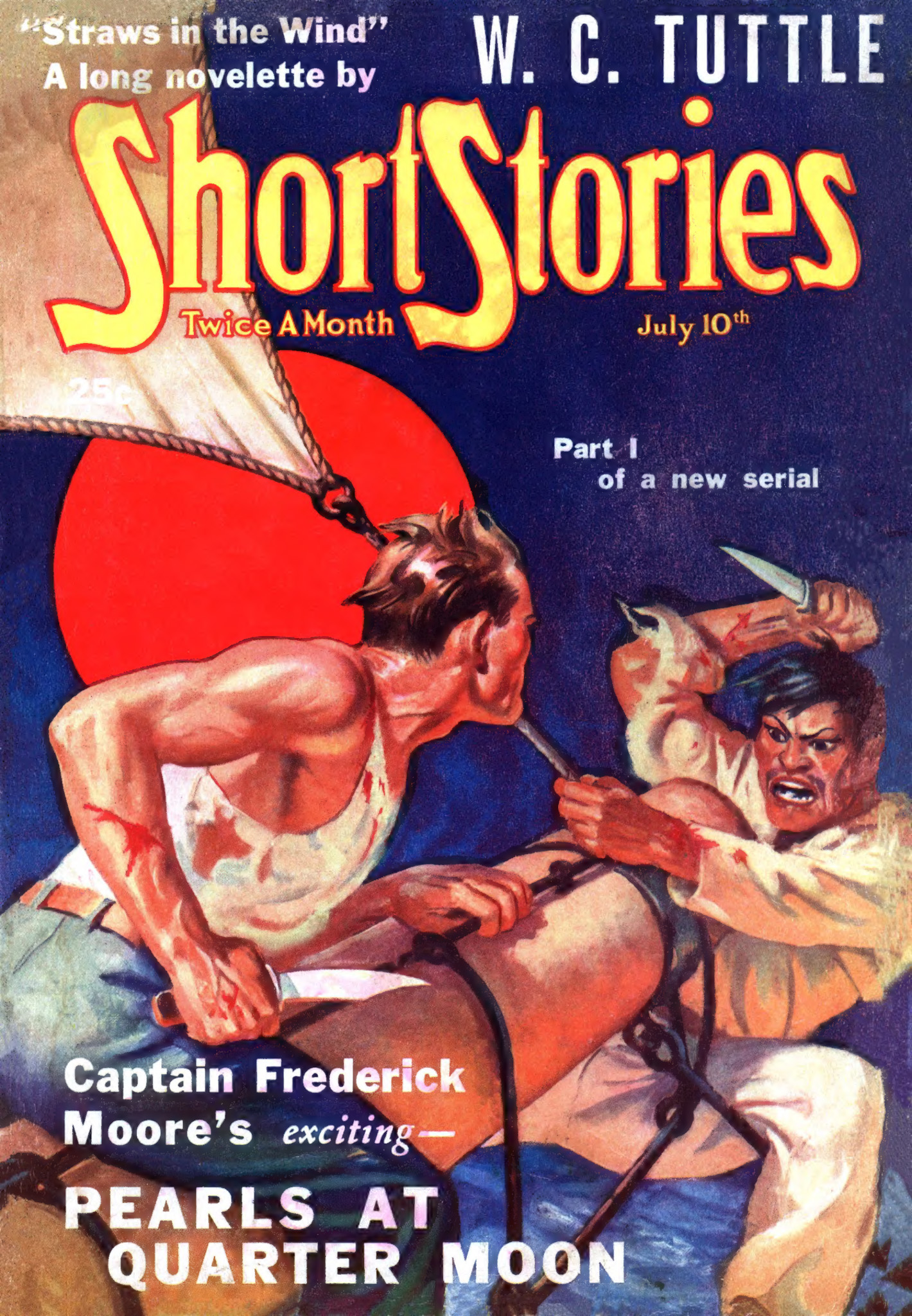
"Pearls at Quarter Moon" was the cover story in the July 10, 1938 issue of Short Stories

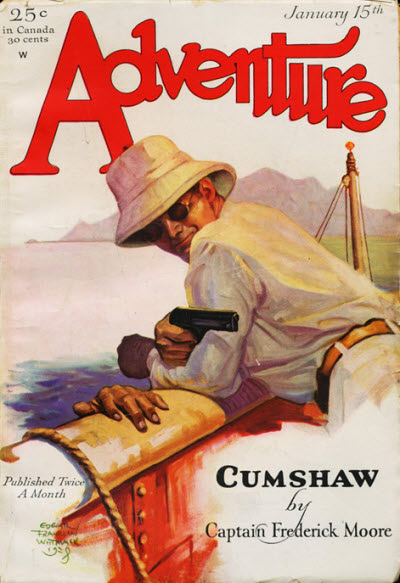
"Cumsaw" was the cover story in the January 1929 issue of Adventure

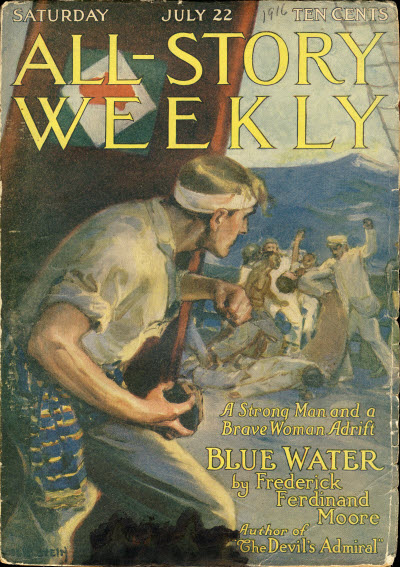
"Blue Water" was the cover story in the July 22, 1916 issue of All-Story Weekly

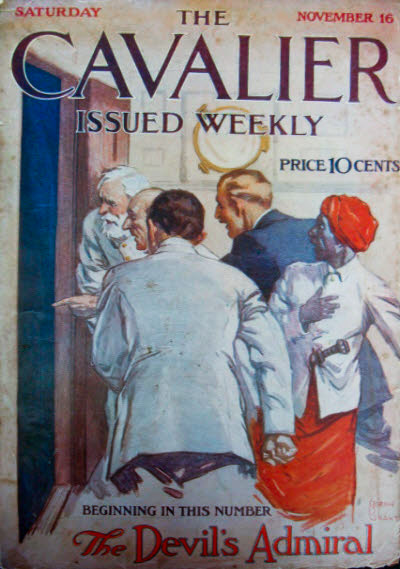
"The Devil's Admiral" was the cover story in the November 16, 1912 issue of The Cavalier

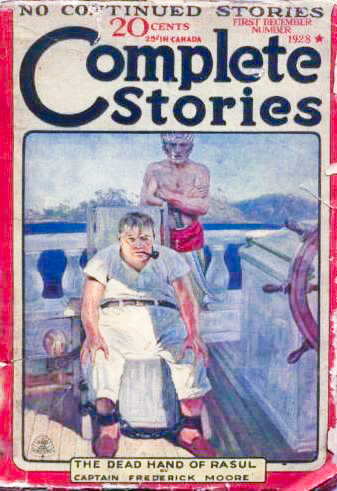
"The Dead Hand of Rasul" was the cover story in the December 1, 1928 issue of Complete Stories

== See also ==
Works by Frederick Ferdinand Moore at Project Gutenberg
