= Cupid the Cowpuncher =

1920 film by Clarence G. Badger

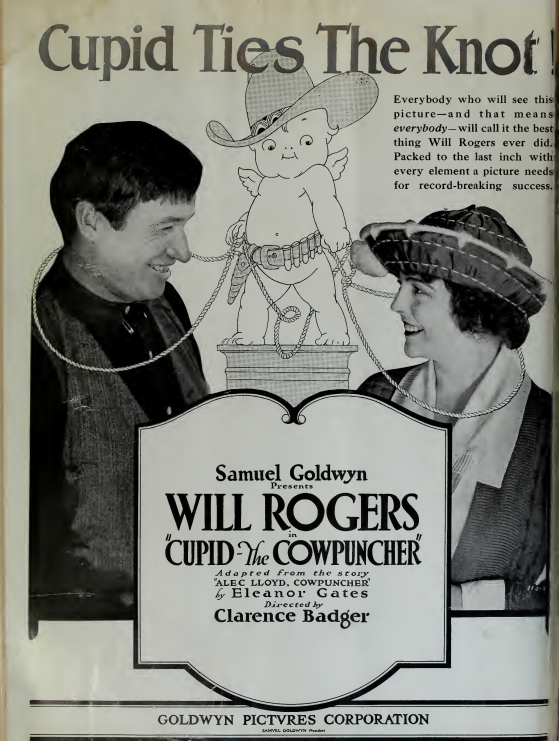
- Will Rogers in the American comedy western film Cupid the Cowpuncher (1920)
- Directed by: Clarence G. Badger
- Screenplay by: Edfrid A. Bingham
- Based on: Cupid: The Cow-Punch by Eleanor Gates
- Produced by: Samuel Goldwyn
- Starring: Will Rogers; Helene Chadwick; Andrew Robson; Lloyd Whitlock; Guinn "Big Boy" Williams; Tex Parker
- Cinematography: Marcel Le Picard
- Production company: Goldwyn Pictures
- Distributed by: Goldwyn Pictures
- Release date: July 25, 1920
- Running time: 50 minutes
- Country: United States
- Language: English

Cupid the Cowpuncher is a 1920 American western comedy film directed by Clarence G. Badger and written by Edfrid A. Bingham. It is based on the 1907 novel Cupid: The Cow-Punch by Eleanor Gates. The film stars Will Rogers, Helene Chadwick, Andrew Robson, Lloyd Whitlock, Guinn "Big Boy" Williams and Tex Parker. The film was released on July 25, 1920, by Goldwyn Pictures.

== Plot ==
Alec Lloyd, the overseer of the Sewell ranch, earns the nickname "Cupid" for his knack for playing matchmaker. Upon Macie Sewell's return from boarding school, Alec finds himself unexpectedly smitten with love, although Macie dreams of pursuing a career as an opera singer in New York and rebuffs his advances. Meanwhile, Leroy Simpson, a financially struggling doctor infatuated with Macie's father's wealth, supports her aspirations.

Despite facing obstacles, Macie diligently saves her earnings and eventually buys a train ticket to pursue her dreams in the city. However, Alec discovers that Simpson also holds a ticket for the same train. Determined to confront his rival, Alec mounts his horse and gives chase, compelling Simpson to confess his ulterior motives of seeking Macie's fortune. Upon learning the truth, Macie reconsiders her ambitions and chooses to marry Alec, setting aside her dreams of becoming an opera singer.

== Cast ==
- Will Rogers as Alec Lloyd
- Helene Chadwick as Macie Sewell
- Andrew Robson as Zack Sewell
- Lloyd Whitlock as Dr. Leroy Simpson
- Guinn "Big Boy" Williams as Hairoil Johnson
- Tex Parker as Monkey Mike
- Roy Laidlaw as Dr. Billy Trowbridge
- Catherine Wallace as Rose
- Nelson McDowell as Sheriff Bergin
- Cordelia Callahan as Mrs. Bergin
