= The Samovar Girl =

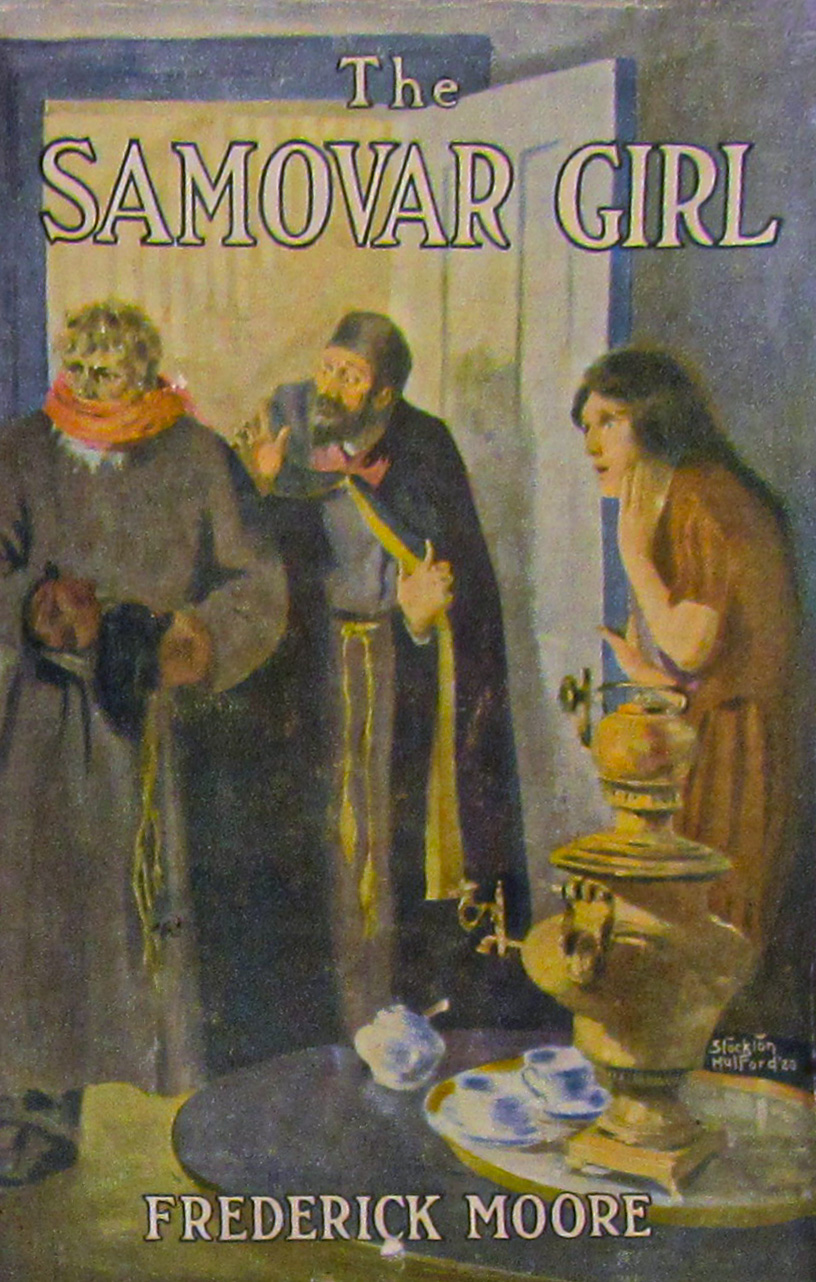
- Dust Jacket of 1921 edition
- Author: Frederick Ferdinand Moore
- Language: English
- Genre: fiction, romantic suspense
- Publisher: D. Appleton & Company
- Publication date: 1921
- Pages: 307
- OCLC: 810779110
- LC Class: 21010335

The Samovar Girl in a 1921 romance/adventure novel based in Chita in eastern Siberia during the Russian Civil War. The novel was written by Frederick Ferdinand Moore who drew on his experience in Siberia as an intelligence officer with the US Army during the Allied intervention in the Russian Civil War.

The protagonist of the novel is the Russian son of a bootmaker, Peter, who witnesses his father's unjustified killing at the behest of the Czar's governor. The boy is imprisoned and rescued by an American who brings him to the United States. Twenty years later, the boy, now Lieutenant Peter Gordon of the US Army, returns to his hometown and seeks to avenge the killing of his father. Meanwhile, the former governor and his daughter, the Korsakoffs, are in hiding but their location is discovered by the soldiers of the local leader, the Ataman Zorogoff. The Korsakoffs believe friends sent the visiting American to rescue them and lead them to safety. The novel continues down a twisting path of intrigue where the ruling Cossacks, Korsakoffs and Gordon scheme to each seek their objectives while never knowing whom to trust.

Moore dedicated the book to Robert H. Davis, a journalist and photographer who was editor of Munsey's Magazine at the time of printing the book.

== Critical reviews ==
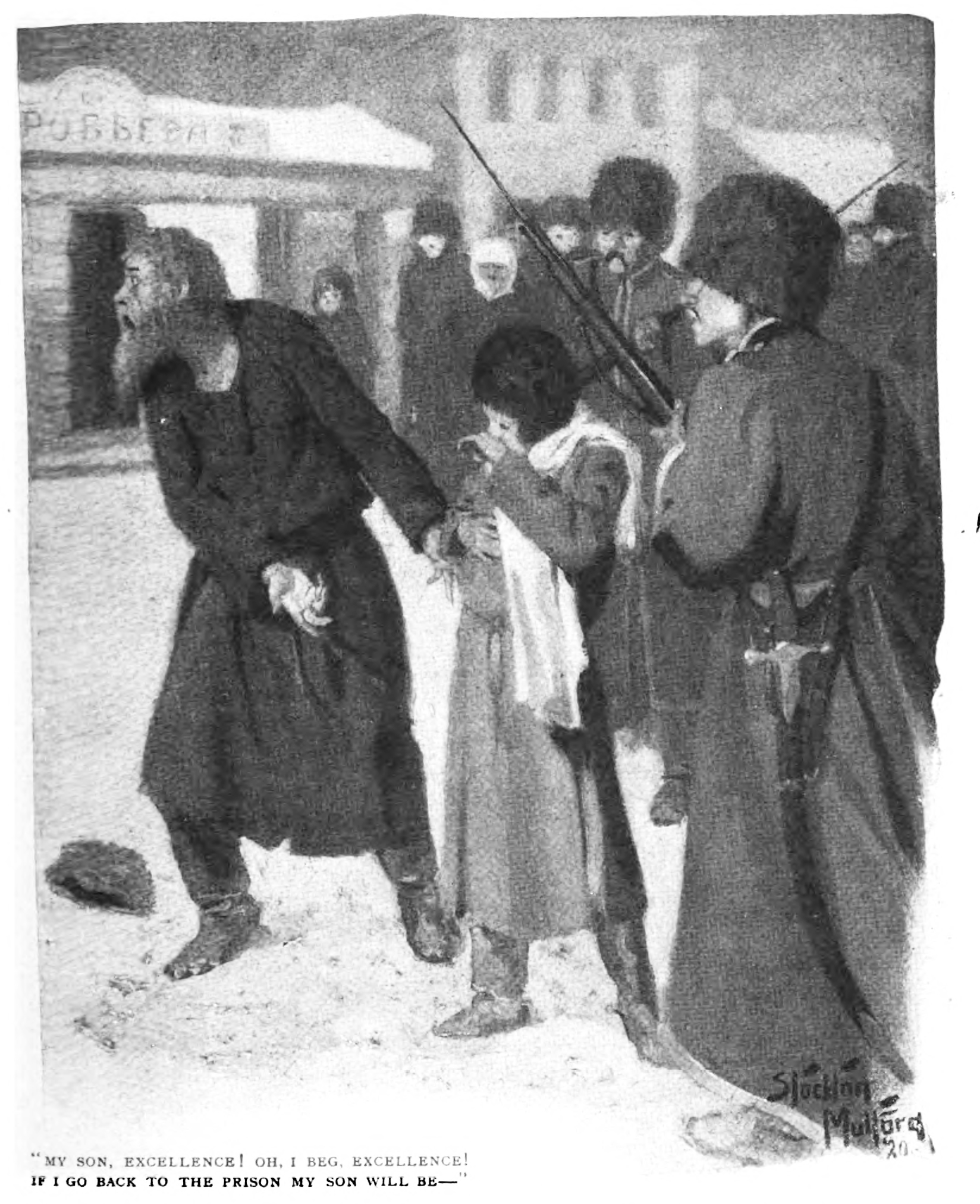
Illustration from the 1921 edition of The Samovar Girl in Munsey's Magazine.

The New York Times Book Review and Magazine: "…a tale that does not slacken in interest from beginning to end."

The Argonaut: "Frederick Moore has a keen insight into the Slavic mind … he delights in analyzing every motive of his characters. In fact one would expect from the analytical method to have a novel more realistic and less adventurous."

Fresno Morning Republican: "Capt. Moore knows that of which he writes, and has told a dramatic story of peasants, convicts, exiles, revolutionists, Cossacks, and, through all the struggling ideals of almost voiceless Siberia."

Buffalo Morning Express: "…gives a vivid picture of life in that solely stricken land where the autocrat of today may be the refugee of tomorrow."

The St. Louis Star and Times: Mr Moore's attitude "is that of the inquiring American seeking to sympathize with the situation in Russia. He gives the reader a story romantic and vivid and portrays Siberian conditions without gloss or sensationalism."

Oakland Tribune: "Moore has used the chaotic state of affairs in Russia following the revolution to make possible some events that have a dramatic and convincing appeal. He pictures the ascendancy of a Mongol governor and makes plausible the unexpected ending to an adventure that would seem headed to destruction."
