= The Devil's Admiral =

The Devil’s Admiral
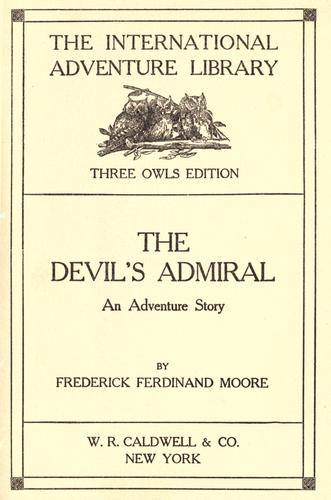
- Author: Frederick Ferdinand Moore
- Language: English
- Genre: fiction
- Publisher: Doubleday, Page & Company
- Publication date: 1913
- Pages: 295
- OCLC: 1709489

The Devil's Admiral: An Adventure Story is a 1913 adventure novel by American author Frederick Ferdinand Moore. Drawing from Moore's extensive experiences as a sailor, soldier, and war correspondent, the novel offers a gripping tale of maritime intrigue and peril set in the early 20th-century Pacific.

== Background ==
Frederick Ferdinand Moore (1881–1947) was an American novelist, short story writer and journalist. His career included service in the U.S. Army during the Philippine–American War and work as a correspondent covering the Russo-Japanese War. Moore's firsthand experiences in Asia and the Pacific heavily influenced his writing, providing authentic detail to his adventure narratives. The characters in The Devil's Admiral are based on individuals Moore encountered during his seafaring days. Moore wrote the novel while working as a staff reporter for the San Francisco Examiner.

== Plot summary ==
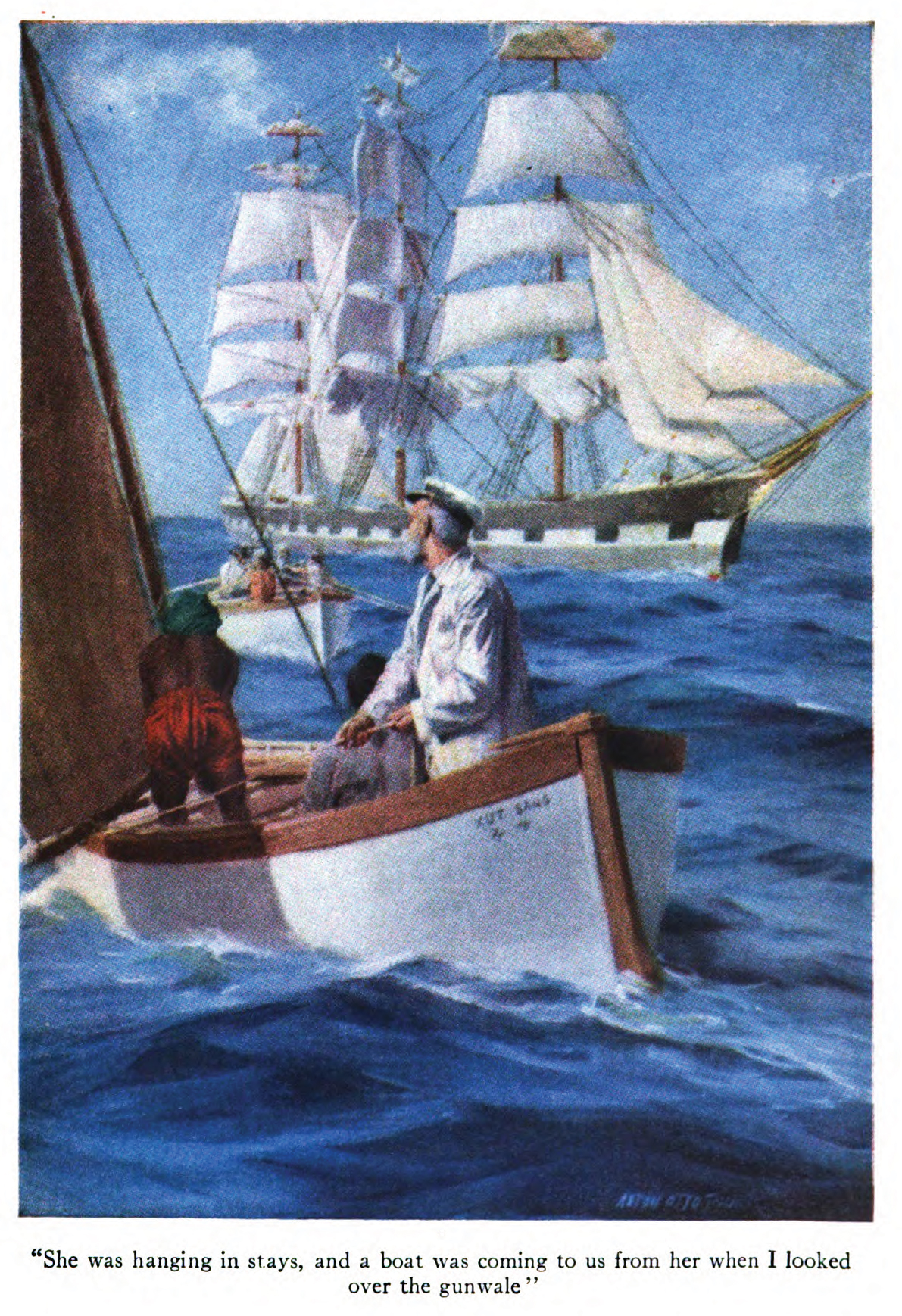
Illustration by Anton Otto Fischer in The Devil's Admiral

The Devil's Admiral opens in the colonial port of Manila, where American sailor James Augustus Trenholm prepares for a routine voyage aboard the British steamer Kut Sang, bound for Hong Kong. Trenholm is a capable and somewhat cynical adventurer with a keen eye for danger—traits that quickly become essential as the voyage takes an ominous turn.

From the outset, the ship’s passenger list arouses suspicion: a red-bearded vagrant named Petrak boards at the last minute, along with the Reverend Luther Meeker, a missionary with a secretive air. Trenholm also observes the curious behavior of the ship’s captain and officers, who seem nervous and on edge. Within hours of departure, the voyage descends into chaos when one of the officers is found murdered under mysterious circumstances.

As the body count rises, Trenholm is drawn into a deadly game of cat and mouse. He must untangle the web of lies among the passengers and crew, each of whom may have a motive and a past to hide. His suspicions begin to focus on Reverend Meeker, whose identity and actions increasingly point toward a sinister agenda.

The novel’s title refers to a shadowy and powerful pirate leader—a ghostly figure operating in the lawless waters of the South China Sea, feared among sailors and whispered about in dockside bars. As the Kut Sang steams closer to Hong Kong, Trenholm uncovers a plot involving stolen treasure, political espionage, and betrayal, leading him to confront the truth: one of the men aboard may in fact be the elusive “Devil’s Admiral” himself.

The story climaxes with a harrowing confrontation aboard the ship during a tropical storm, in which Trenholm must rely on his cunning, physical strength, and moral judgment to survive. In the end, justice prevails, but not without cost, as Trenholm reflects on the corrosive effects of greed and secrecy—both at sea and ashore.

== Reception ==
Upon its release, The Devil's Admiral was well-received for its vivid storytelling and authentic depiction of seafaring life. Contemporary reviews praised Moore's ability to craft suspenseful narratives grounded in real-world experiences. The novel's blend of adventure and realism resonated with readers seeking thrilling tales set against exotic backdrops.

The story is what R. L. Stevenson would have called "a crawler." It is as full of action as a gatlin gun. Indeed the author has guns firing and knives plying from beginning to end. Some of the chapters are thrilling, even if men are butchered in an inartistic way. Killing is natural in a pirate story, but some of it should be done behind the scenes. But it's a good story. Well worth writing and reading. We understand it is the author's first venture on the sea of literature and we wish him every success and with his first book he has nearly reached the standard of Rex Beach and Jack London with both of which writers he has much in common without any trace of imitation. The Sailors Magazine

== Legacy ==
While not as widely known today, The Devil's Admiral remains a notable example of early 20th-century adventure fiction. Its detailed portrayal of maritime life and exploration of themes such as loyalty, betrayal, and the human capacity for resilience continue to engage readers.

The novel is available in the public domain and can be accessed through various online platforms, including Project Gutenberg and the Internet Archive.
