= White Chapel Memorial Cemetery =

Cemetery in Troy, Michigan

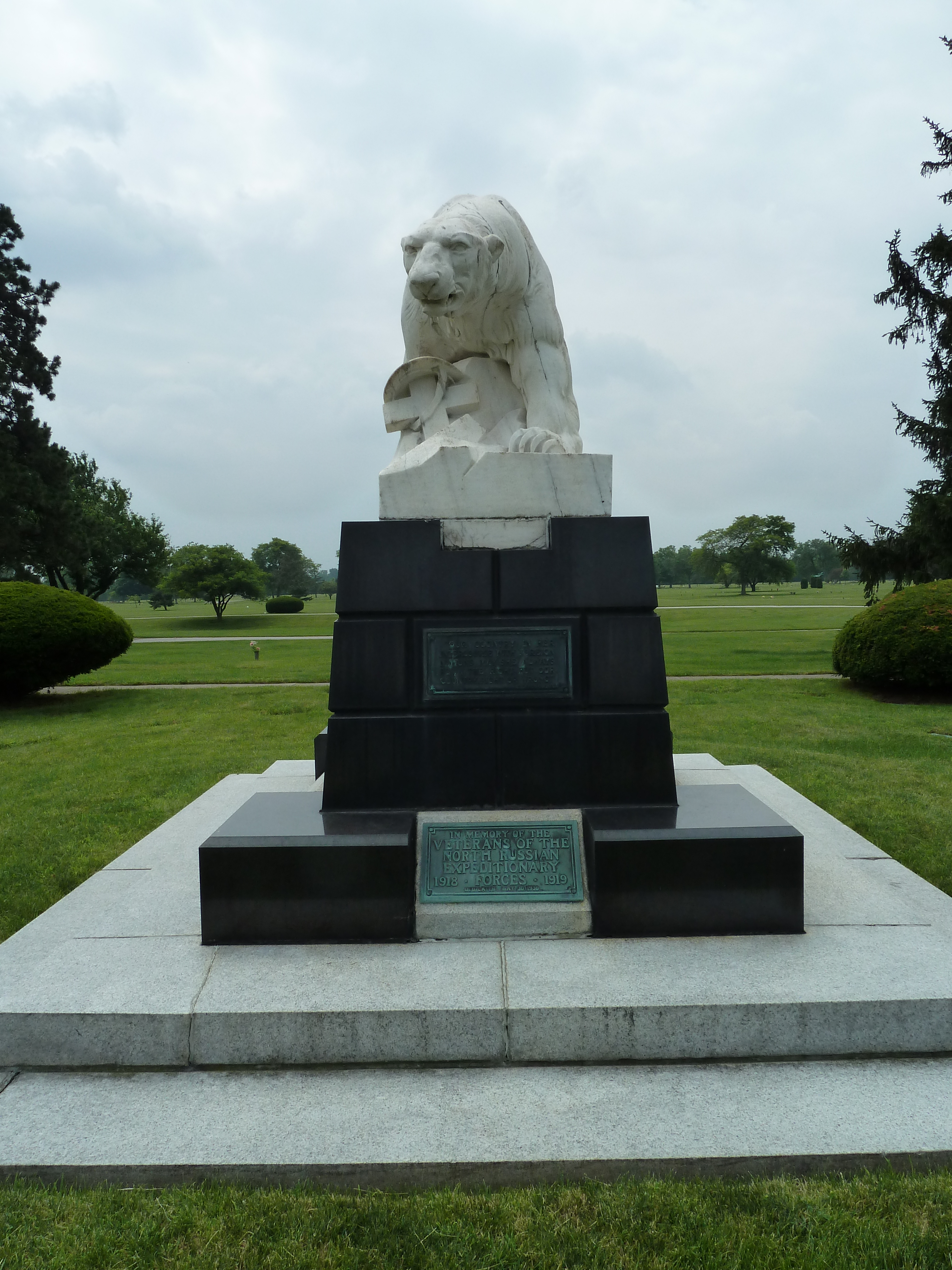
- Polar Bear Memorial
- Interactive map of White Chapel Memorial Cemetery

Details
- Established: 1948
- Location: 621 West Long Lake Road; Troy, Michigan
- Country: United States
- Coordinates: 42.58560°N 83.16360°W
- Type: Cemetery
- Website: www.whitechapelcemetery.com
- Find a Grave: White Chapel Memorial Cemetery

White Chapel Memorial Cemetery or simply White Chapel Cemetery is a memorial cemetery at 621 West Long Lake Road in Troy, Oakland County, Michigan. In the 1920s, a group of investors led by Clarence J. Sanger had a new vision for a cemetery and proposed their idea to Detroit architect Alvin Harley. After viewing Harley's initial designs, Sanger urged him to make them more grand. Construction began in 1925 and the cemetery began operation in 1929. Harley's plan created a long central boulevard flanked by rectangular sections extending from the main gate. The boulevard ends at a two-story T-shaped mausoleum faced in white marble, set on a white marble base. Above the central entrance is a square two-story tower which houses a grand hall. Directly behind the hall is one of three chapels in the structure. Crypts are housed in wings extending to the east and west of the grand hall.

== Polar Bear Memorial ==
The state of Michigan dedicated a memorial on May 30, 1930, honoring the U.S. Army's Polar Bear Expedition. It recognizes the efforts of the American North Russia Expeditionary Force (ANREF) against the Bolshevik Red Army in North Russia during 1918 and 1919. The remains of 56 ANREF soldiers exhumed from Russia were on this occasion re-buried in plots surrounding the Polar Bear Monument by sculptor Leon Hermant.

== Discrimination ==
On August 10, 1960, an honorably discharged 66-year-old World War I veteran, George Vincent Nash, was removed from resting alongside his Caucasian wife at the White Chapel Cemetery.

The action took place immediately following the graveside service because Nash was a full-blooded Ho-Chunk (also known as Winnebago) or Native American. The explanation was that 40,000 plot owners "had paid for the restriction" for the type of people that could be buried at White Chapel Cemetery. According to the cemetery's officials, corpses had to be at least 75% Caucasian to be buried at White Chapel. The governor, G. Mennen Williams, was concerned about the legality of the cemetery's actions. However, the Michigan state legislatures in both 1961 and 1962, failed to pass bills that would have prohibited cemeteries to discriminate who could be interred in them on the basis of race.

== Notable burials ==
- Jack Adams (ice hockey player)
- Eileen "Terry" Ambrose (actress and model)
- Brace Beemer (radio announcer and actor)
- William S. Broomfield (US Congressman)
- Donald Byrd (musician)
- Russell Clark (member of the John Dillinger gang
- John DeLorean (engineer and automaker)
- Roy August Fruehauf (president of Freuhauf Trailer Corporation)
- Ebbie Goodfellow (hall of fame professional hockey player and coach)
- Josephine Hoffa (wife of Jimmy Hoffa)
- Lee Iacocca (businessman)
- Albert Kahn (architect)
- Jack Kevorkian (American pathologist and euthanasia activist) Plot: Section H, 6178
- Clem Koshorek (baseball player) Plot: Garden of Prayer, Section 638-1
- J. P. McCarthy (radio personality)
- Douglas Ramsay (figure skater)
- Mauri Rose (racecar driver) Garden of Prayer, Section C, Grave #275
- Eero Saarinen (architect)
- Robert Shumard (WWII United States army air corps soldier)
- Murray Van Wagoner (Michigan Governor)
- Bobby Veach (baseball player) Plot: Mausoleum, First Floor, Section #1212
