= Eleanor Gates =

American playwright (1874–1951)

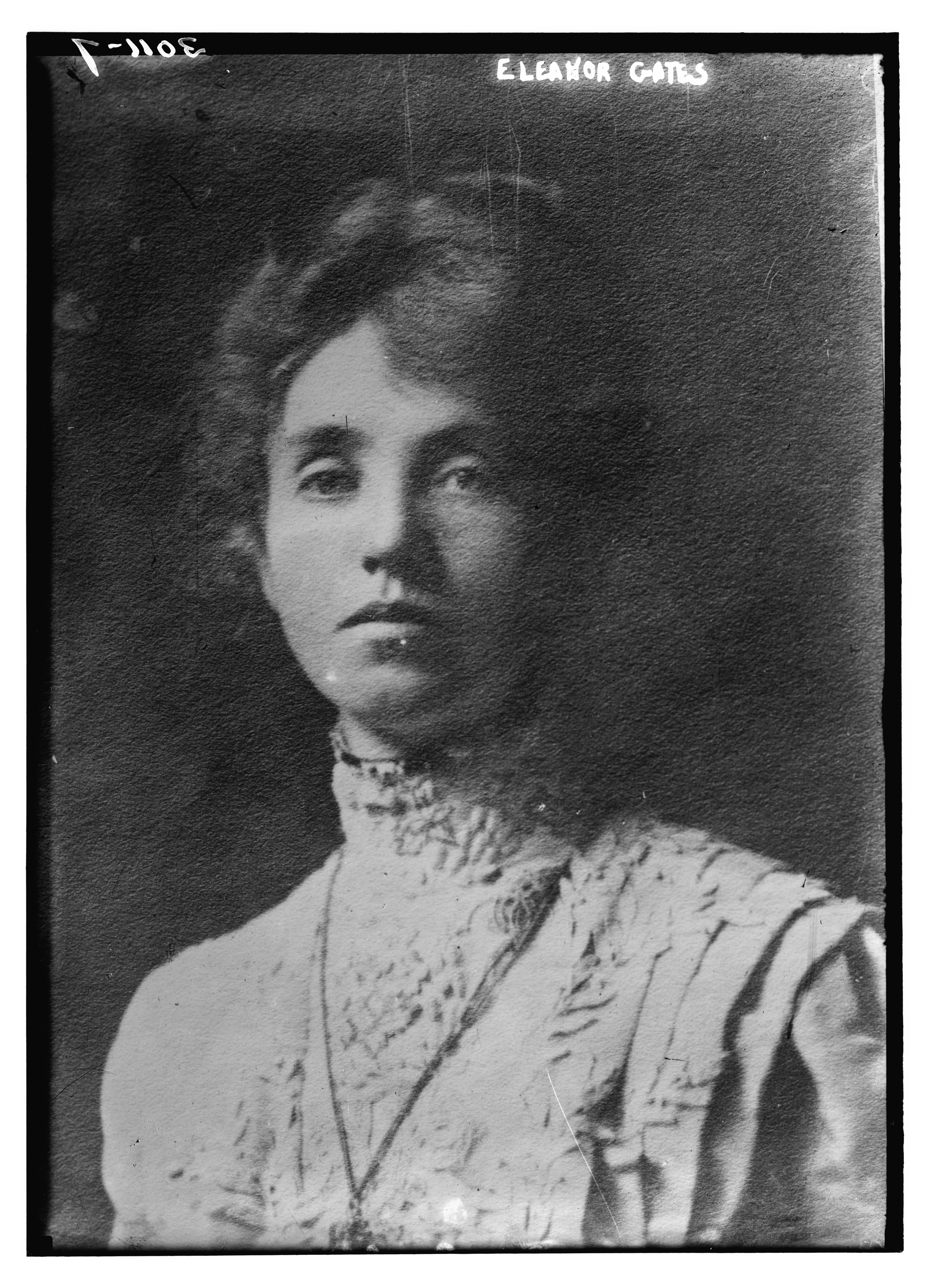
- Born: 26 September 1874; Shakopee, Minnesota, U.S.
- Died: 7 March 1951 (aged 76); Los Angeles, California, U.S.
- Education: University of California and Stanford University
- Occupation: Playwright
- Spouse(s): Richard Walton Tully; 1901–14 (divorce); Frederick Ferdinand Moore; 1914-16 (not legal)

Eleanor Gates (26 September 1874 – 7 March 1951) was an American playwright, novelist, short story writer and screenwriter. Her best known work was The Poor Little Rich Girl, which was produced by her husband in 1913 and adapted into films for Mary Pickford in 1917 and for Shirley Temple in 1936. Gates's literary works often drew upon her experiences growing up on the American frontier, and she was noted for her vivid characterizations and exploration of themes such as class disparity and personal discovery.

== Early life and education ==
Gates was born in Shakopee, Minnesota, to William Cummings Gates and Margaret (Archer) Gates. During her infancy, her family relocated to a cattle ranch in the Jim River Valley of South Dakota. These early frontier experiences would later serve as inspiration for her literary works. She later described her early life in her novel The Biography of a Prairie Girl. Her mother died while Gates was in her teens and the family moved to Shasta, California where Gates attended public school.

Gates pursued higher education at Stanford University (1894–1895) and the University of California, Berkeley (1899–1901). While studying, she also worked as a journalist for several San Francisco newspapers, including the Examiner, Call, and Chronicle, as well as the Oakland Enquirer.

== Career ==
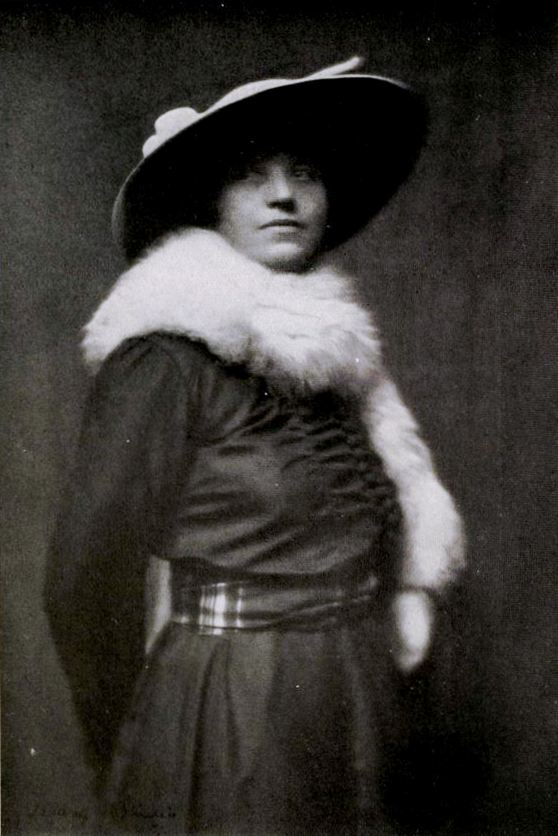
Eleanor Gates ca 1916

Gates had worked initially as a writer for a newspaper in San Francisco, as well as writing novels. On 1906 she spoke out in Cosmopolitan about the problem of unwanted sexual advances made to women and girls when travelling. In the following issue she continued the theme highlighting the problem in how it effected working women in particular. In 1907, one of her novels was illustrated by Arthur Rackham.

Her best known work was the play The Poor Little Rich Girl, which was produced by her husband in 1913.

In 1914 The New York Times published a story about her idea that there should be places where working women and their children could stay.

In 1914, Gates founded the Eleanor Gates Photo-Play Company. According to Moving Picture World, "She is one of the first authors, as well as one of the first women, to head her own motion picture producing company." Only one film is known to have been produced by Gates's company: Doc, released in 1914 and based on her short story from The Saturday Evening Post.

In 1917, The Poor Little Rich Girl was made by Mary Pickford's production company and distributed by Artcraft Pictures Corp. for Famous Players. Shirley Temple starred in the 1936 remake of the same name. The film story, created to cash in on the talents of the eight-year-old Temple and the rights to the "changing places" story, was obtained for $20,000 to Gates and an additional $20,000 to Mary Pickford's company which had made the 1917 film. The new film had made two million dollars by the end of 1939.

== Personal life ==
Gates married fellow playwright Richard Walton Tully in 1901 while they were both students at the University of California, Berkeley. Tully divorced her in 1914 citing desertion, which Gates admitted.

On 18 October 1914, Gates married another divorcé, the novelist and short story writer Frederick Ferdinand Moore, in Paterson, New Jersey. At the time of the wedding, Gates and Moore had interlocutory decrees of divorce and they had been advised that they were legally entitled to be married. However, in 1916 Gates annulled the marriage to Moore after learning that there was some question to the legality of their union. At the time they both said they intended to remarry when it could be arranged. They never remarried but lived together and collaborated on works until the early 1930s.

== Death ==
Gates was struck down near her home by an automobile and died on 7 March 1951 in Los Angeles County General Hospital. She was buried at Forest Lawn Memorial Park in Glendale on 28 July 1951 after delays caused by a fruitless search in New York for a will.

== Selected works ==
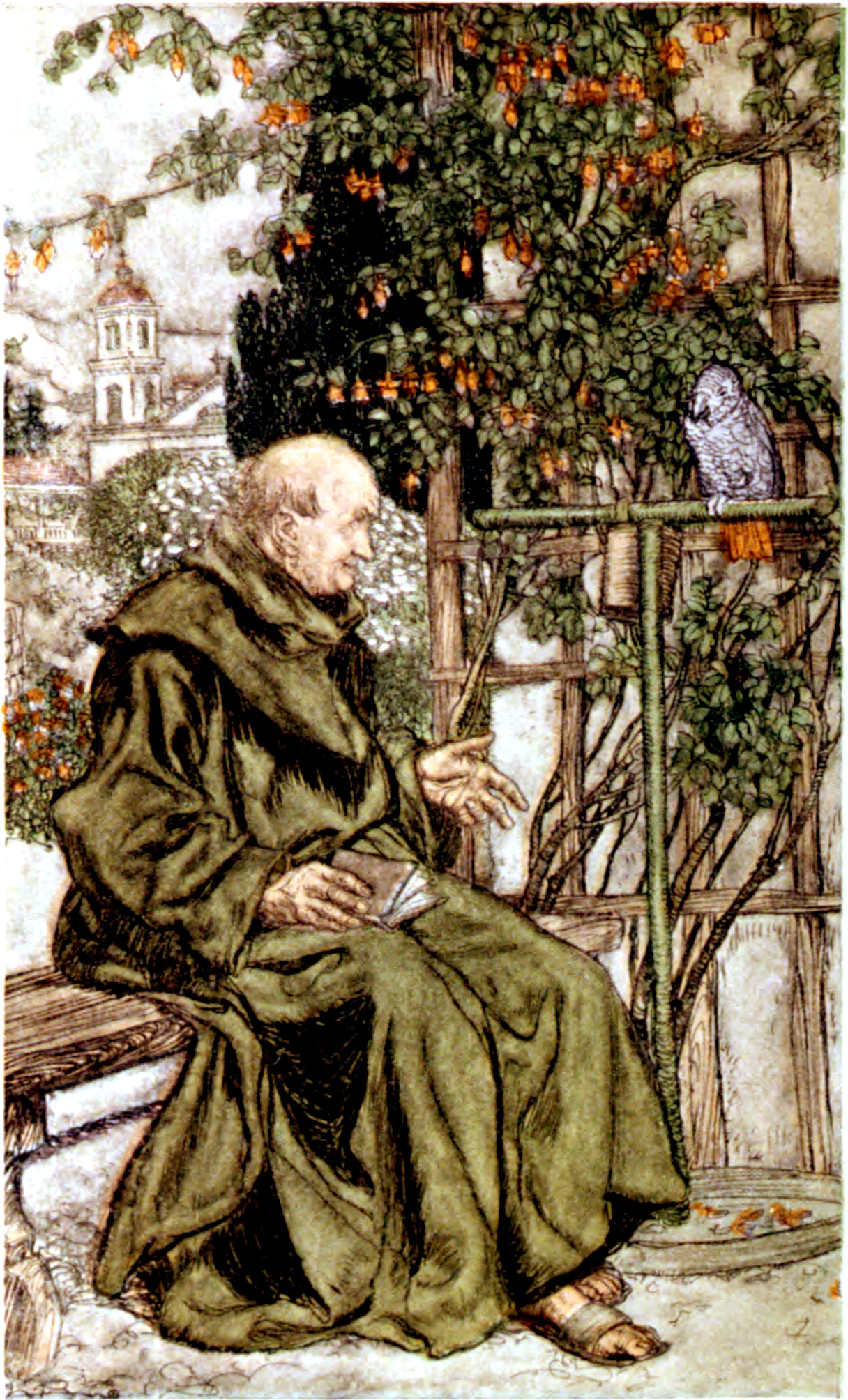
An illustration by Arthur Rackham for her 1907 novel, Good-Night

- The Biography of a Prairie Girl (1902)
- The Plow-Woman (1906) adapted for 1917 film
- Good-night: (Buenas Noches) (1907) - illustrated by Arthur Rackham
- Cupid the Cowpuncher (1907) (1920 film with same name based on her story)
- The Justice of Gideon (1910) - a collection of stories including Doc (made into a 1914 film) and Search for the Spring (made into a 1934 film called Once to Every Bachelor)
- The Poor Little Rich Girl (1912)
- We Are Seven (1915)
- Swat the Fly (1915)
- Apron-Strings (1917)
- Piggie (1919)
- Phoebe (1919)
- The Rich Little Poor Boy (1922)
- Fish-Bait (1928)
- Pa Hardy (1936)
