= Poor Little Rich Girl (1936 film) =

1936 US musical film directed by Irving Cummings

- Theatrical release poster
- Directed by: Irving Cummings
- Screenplay by: Sam Hellman; Gladys Lehman; Harry Tugend
- Story by: Eleanor Gates; Ralph Spence
- Produced by: Darryl F. Zanuck
- Starring: Shirley Temple; Alice Faye; Jack Haley; Gloria Stuart; Michael Whalen; Claude Gillingwater
- Cinematography: John F. Seitz
- Edited by: Jack Murray
- Music by: Mack Gordon; Harry Revel
- Distributed by: Twentieth Century-Fox Film Corporation
- Release date: July 24, 1936
- Running time: 79 minutes
- Country: United States
- Language: English
- Box office: $1.4 million

Poor Little Rich Girl, advertised as The Poor Little Rich Girl, is a 1936 American musical film directed by Irving Cummings and starring Shirley Temple, Alice Faye and Jack Haley. The screenplay by Sam Hellman, Gladys Lehman, and Harry Tugend was based on stories by Eleanor Gates and Ralph Spence, and the 1917 Mary Pickford vehicle of the same name. The film focuses on a child (Temple) neglected by her rich and busy father. She meets two vaudeville performers and becomes a radio singing star. The film received a lukewarm critical reception from The New York Times.

== Plot ==
Barbara Barry is the young daughter of wealthy Richard Barry, a recently widowed soap manufacturer. Worried that his daughter is spending too much time alone and not with other children her age, her father decides to send Barbara to boarding school. At the train station, Barbara and her accompanying nanny are separated when the nanny, Collins (Sara Haden), while looking for her stolen handbag, is hit and killed by a car.

Barbara, left alone, wanders off and masquerades as an orphan. While wandering the streets, she encounters a friendly Italian street performer, Tony the organ grinder. Barbara follows him home after his performance. She witnesses his many children run out to meet him at the door. Barbara lingers, lonely and sad. The kind and friendly family invite Barbara in. She has dinner with them, where she experiences eating spaghetti for the first time. After dinner, the mother puts her to bed with her own children.

She attracts the notice of struggling vaudeville performers, Jimmy Dolan and his wife Jerry, who live upstairs. They put Barbara, posing as their daughter, into their radio act. Helped by advertising executive Margaret Allen, the trio become an overnight success. Mr. Barry hears his daughter singing on the radio and the two are reunited. Subplots involve a romance between Barry and Allen, and a crook trying to kidnap Barbara.

== Cast ==
- Shirley Temple as Barbara Barry, Richard Barry's daughter
- Jack Haley as Jimmy Dolan, a vaudeville performer and Jerry's husband
- Alice Faye as Jerry Dolan, a vaudeville performer and Jimmy Dolan's wife
- Gloria Stuart as Margaret Allen, an advertising executive
- Michael Whalen as Richard Barry, a widower, Barbara's father, and a soap manufacturer
- Claude Gillingwater, as Peck, Barry's competitor in soap manufacturing
- Sara Haden as Collins, a servant in the Barry home
- Jane Darwell as Woodward, a servant in the Barry home
- Arthur Hoyt as Percival Hooch, Peck's assistant
- Henry Armetta as Tony, the organ grinder
- Tony Martin as Radio Baritone Soloist (uncredited)
- Paul Stanton as George Hathaway
- Charles Coleman as Stebbins
- John Wray as Flagin, the would-be kidnapper
- Tyler Brooke as Dan Ward
- Mathilde Comont as Tony's Wife

== Production ==
The film's tacked-on musical number, "Military Man", encountered a great deal of difficulties. In her autobiography, Temple mentioned that Haley and her mother got into an altercation after multiple failed attempts by Temple, Haley, and Faye to synchronize their taps in the sound room. Her mother blamed Haley while Haley blamed it on Temple. To complicate matters, one of Temple's teeth fell out while she was doing the routine in the sound room. Finally, as it came close to Temple's legally allowed work hours for the day, they decided to let her do the routine by herself and dub it in with Haley's and Faye's taps recorded later. According to her, she nailed the routine, despite reports to the contrary.

While Mrs. Temple was being interviewed on the set, Shirley strolled over and asked the reporter, "Why don't you talk to me? I'm the star."

== Music ==
Mack Gordon and Harry Revel wrote the film's songs: "When I'm with You", "Oh My Goodness", "You've Gotta Eat Your Spinach, Baby", "But Definitely", "Buy a Bar of Barry's", "Military Man", and "Peck's Theme". Shirley Temple sang all the songs and was joined by other cast members for several.

== Reception ==
Frank Nugent of The New York Times described the script as "formless and generally ridiculous" and the picture "virtually non-existent" but "as a display window for the ever-expanding Temple talents, it is entirely satisfying. Miss Temple, as some one has said, never looked lovelier. She dances in a manner which must delight her mentor, Bill Robinson; her voice has begun to take on torch-singer and crooner qualities. Beneath the fascinated gaze of a world-wide audience, a conscious artistry is developing along Hollywood and Broadway lines. It is an engrossing phenomenon: The precocious infant becomes a knowing child." He lamented on behalf of Haley and Faye: "Short of becoming a defeated candidate for Vice President, we can think of no better way of guaranteeing one's anonymity than appearing in the moppet's films."

The film was nominated for the American Film Institute's 2006 AFI's Greatest Movie Musicals list.

== See also ==
- Shirley Temple filmography
