= American Expeditionary Force, Siberia =

Formation of the United States Army in Siberia during the Russian Civil War

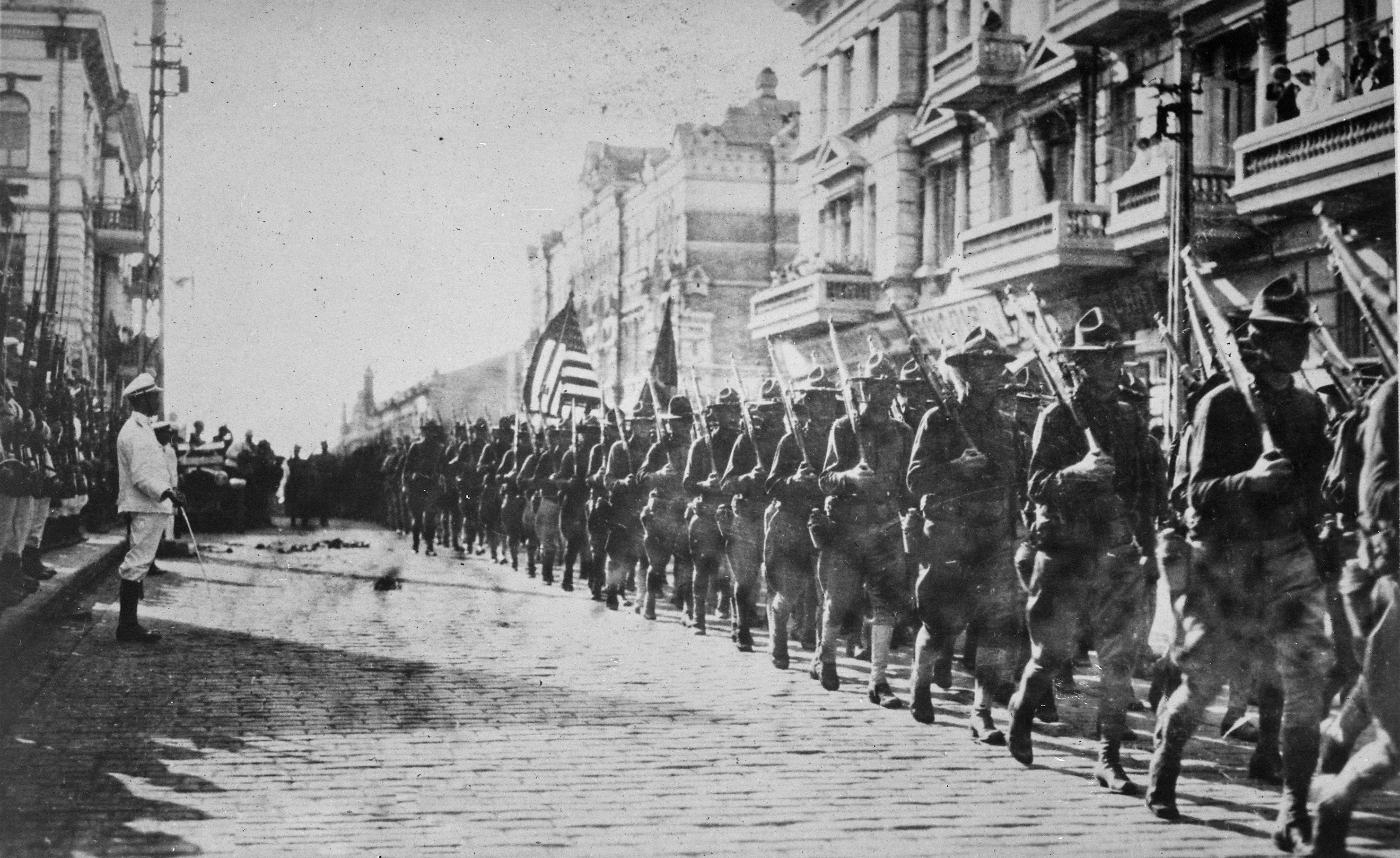
American soldiers in Vladivostok parading before the building occupied by the staff of the Czechoslovak Legion (August 1918).

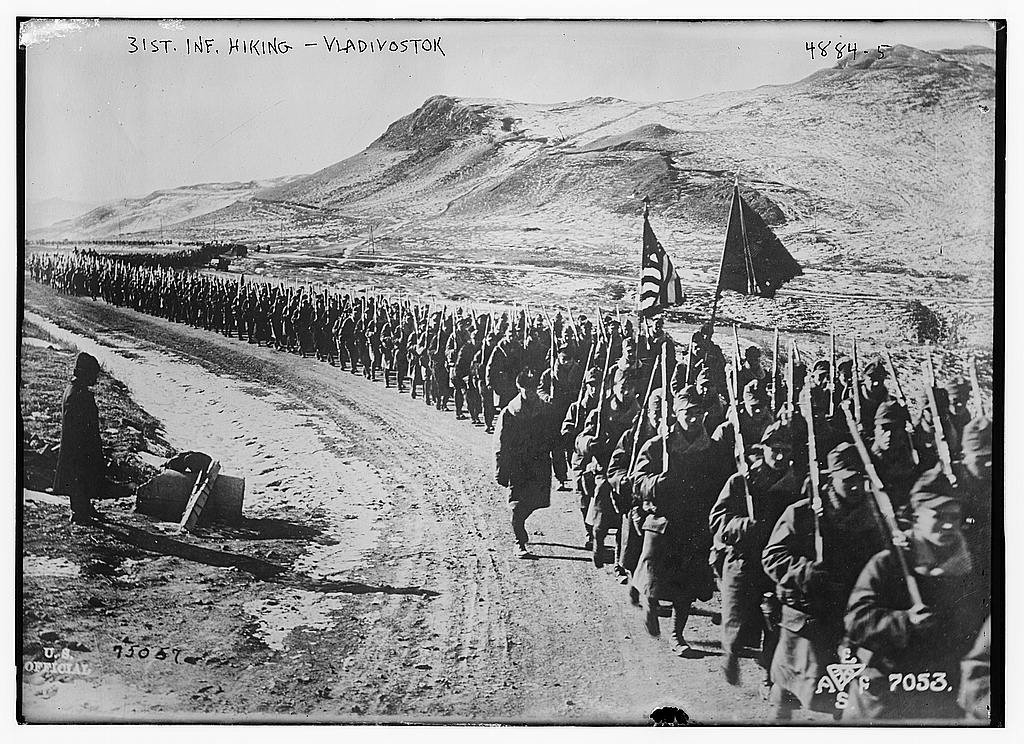
American soldiers from the 31st Infantry marching near Vladivostok Russia April 27, 1919

The American Expeditionary Force, Siberia (AEF in Siberia) was a formation of the United States Army involved in the Russian Civil War in Vladivostok, Russia, after the October Revolution, from 1918 to 1920. The force was part of the larger Allied North Russia intervention. As a result of this expedition, early relations between the United States and the Soviet Union were poor.

U.S. President Woodrow Wilson's claimed objectives for sending troops to Siberia were as much diplomatic as they were military. One major reason was to rescue the 40,000 men of the Czechoslovak Legion, who were being held up by Bolshevik forces as they attempted to make their way along the Trans-Siberian Railroad to Vladivostok, and it was hoped, eventually to the Western Front. Another major reason was to protect the large quantities of military supplies and railroad rolling stock that the United States had sent to the Russian Far East in support of the Russian Empire's war efforts on the Eastern Front of World War I. Equally stressed by Wilson was the need to "steady any efforts at self-government or self defense in which the Russians themselves may be willing to accept assistance." At the time, Bolshevik forces in Siberia controlled only small pockets, and President Wilson wanted to make sure that neither Cossack marauders nor the Japanese military would take advantage of the unstable political environment along the strategic railroad line and in the resource-rich Siberian regions straddling it.

Concurrently and for similar reasons, about 5,000 American soldiers were sent to Arkhangelsk (Archangel), Russia by Wilson as part of the separate Polar Bear Expedition.

== History ==
The AEF in Siberia was commanded by Major General William S. Graves and eventually totaled 7,950 officers and enlisted men. The force included the U.S. Army's 27th and 31st Infantry Regiments, plus large numbers of volunteers from the 12th, 13th, and 62nd Infantry Regiments from Camp Fremont of the 8th Division, Graves' former division command.

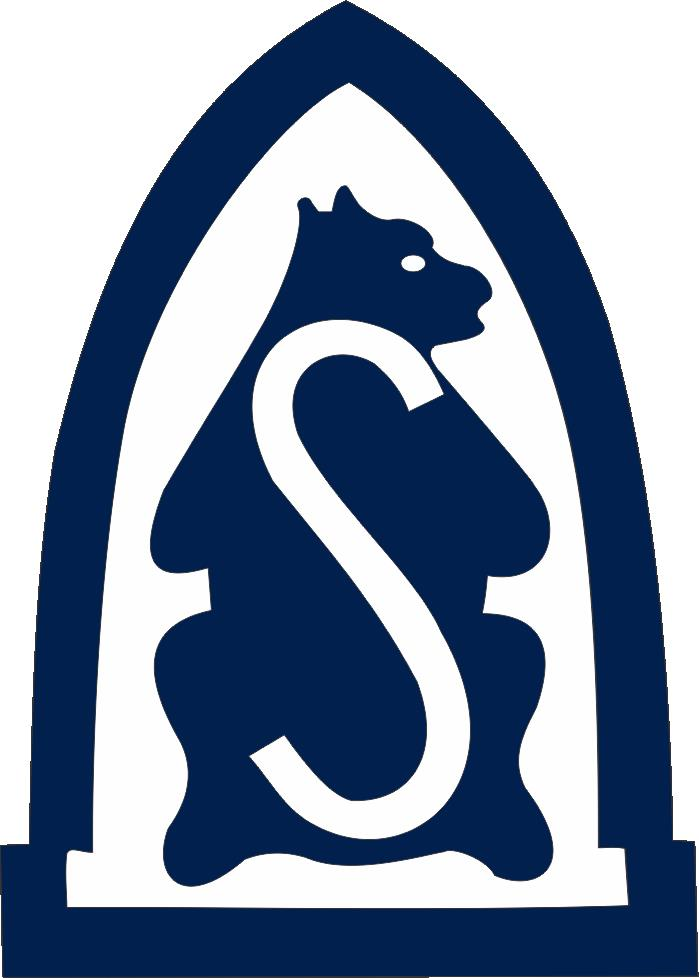
AEF Siberia SSI

The U.S. troops were equipped with M1918 Browning Automatic Rifles (BAR), Auto-5 shotguns/trench clearers, M1903 Springfield rifles, M1911 .45 caliber pistols, and M1917 Browning machine guns depending on their duties. Mosin–Nagant rifles were also used.

Although General Graves did not arrive in Siberia until September 4, 1918, the first 3,000 American troops disembarked in Vladivostok between August 15 and August 21, 1918. They were quickly assigned guard duty along segments of the railway between Vladivostok and Nikolsk-Ussuriski in the north. Units were placed along the railway as far west as Irkutsk and Ulan-Ude.

Unlike his Allied counterparts, General Graves believed their mission in Siberia was to provide protection for American-supplied property and to help the Czechoslovak Legion evacuate Russia, and that it did not include fighting against the Bolsheviks. Repeatedly calling for restraint, Graves often clashed with commanders of British, French, and Japanese forces, who also had troops in the region and who wanted him to take a more active part in the military intervention in Siberia.

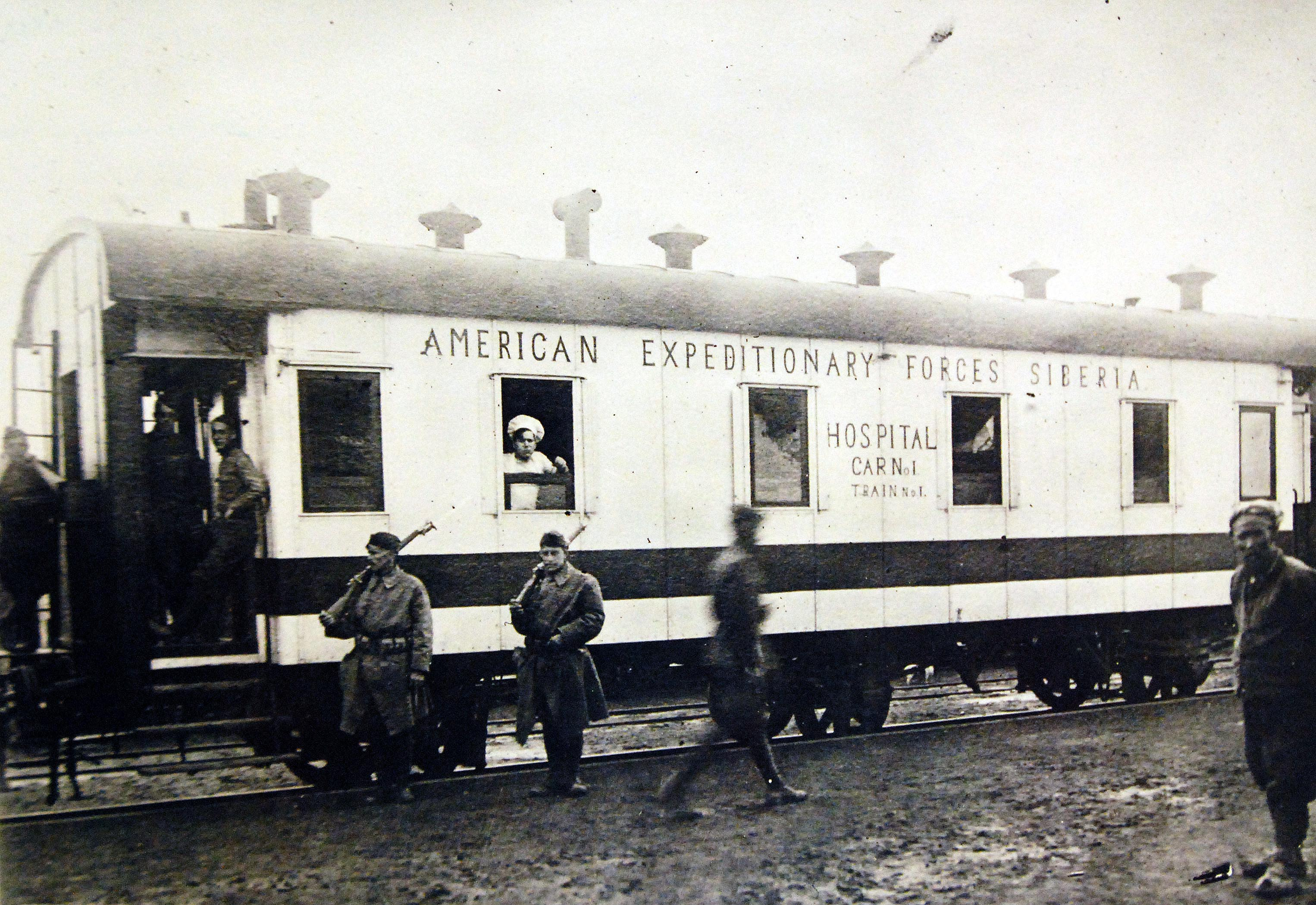
AEF Hospital Car Number 1 at Khabarovsk, Russia

To operate the Trans-Siberian Railroad, the Russian Railway Service Corps was formed of US personnel.

The experience in Siberia for the soldiers was miserable. Problems with fuel, ammunition, supplies, and food were widespread. Horses accustomed to temperate climates were unable to function in sub-zero Russia. Water-cooled machine guns froze and became useless. The last American soldiers left Siberia on April 1, 1920. During their 19 months in Siberia, 189 soldiers of the force died from all causes. As a comparison, the smaller American North Russia Expeditionary Force experienced 235 deaths from all causes during their nine months of fighting near Arkhangelsk.

American socialist author Upton Sinclair, in his novel Oil!, references the AEF in Siberia and ascribes capitalist motives as the primary driver of the Allied intervention.

== Results ==
By every measure, President Wilson's interventions in Russia failed. The Eastern Front had not been reestablished, the war supplies stockpiled in Russian ports had not been saved, and no popular, progressive, non-Communist government had been established. The Japanese continued to meddle in Siberian affairs for another two years in a futile effort to carve out a pro-Japanese puppet state. Even the successful extrication of the Czech Legion had little to do with Graves' small expedition. In the words of Chief of Staff Peyton C. March, the expeditions in Russia had been little more than "a military crime".

== See also ==
- List of states and regions involved in the Russian Civil War
- Bibliography of the Russian Revolution and Civil War
- Outline of the Russian Revolution and Civil War
- American Expeditionary Force, North Russia
- North Russia intervention
- Siberian intervention
- Evgenevka incident – Armed standoff between American and Japanese forces

== Notes ==
1. Robert L. Willett, "Russian Sideshow" (Washington, D.C., Brassey's Inc., 2003), p. 166
2. Robert L. Willett, "Russian Sideshow" (Washington, D.C., Brassey's Inc., 2003), pp. 166–167, 170
3. Guarding the Railroad, Taming the Cossacks The U.S. Army in Russia, 1918–1920, Smith, Gibson Bell
4. Robert L. Willett, "Russian Sideshow" (Washington, D.C., Brassey's Inc., 2003), p. 267
5. U.S. Army Counterinsurgency and Contingency Operations Doctrine, 1860-1941 / by Andrew J. Birtle. – Washington D.C.: Center of Military History of the United States Army, 1998. – p. 226
