= Peter Henry Emerson =

British writer and photographer

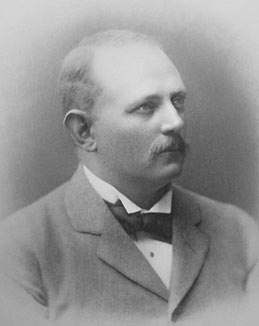
Peter Henry Emerson

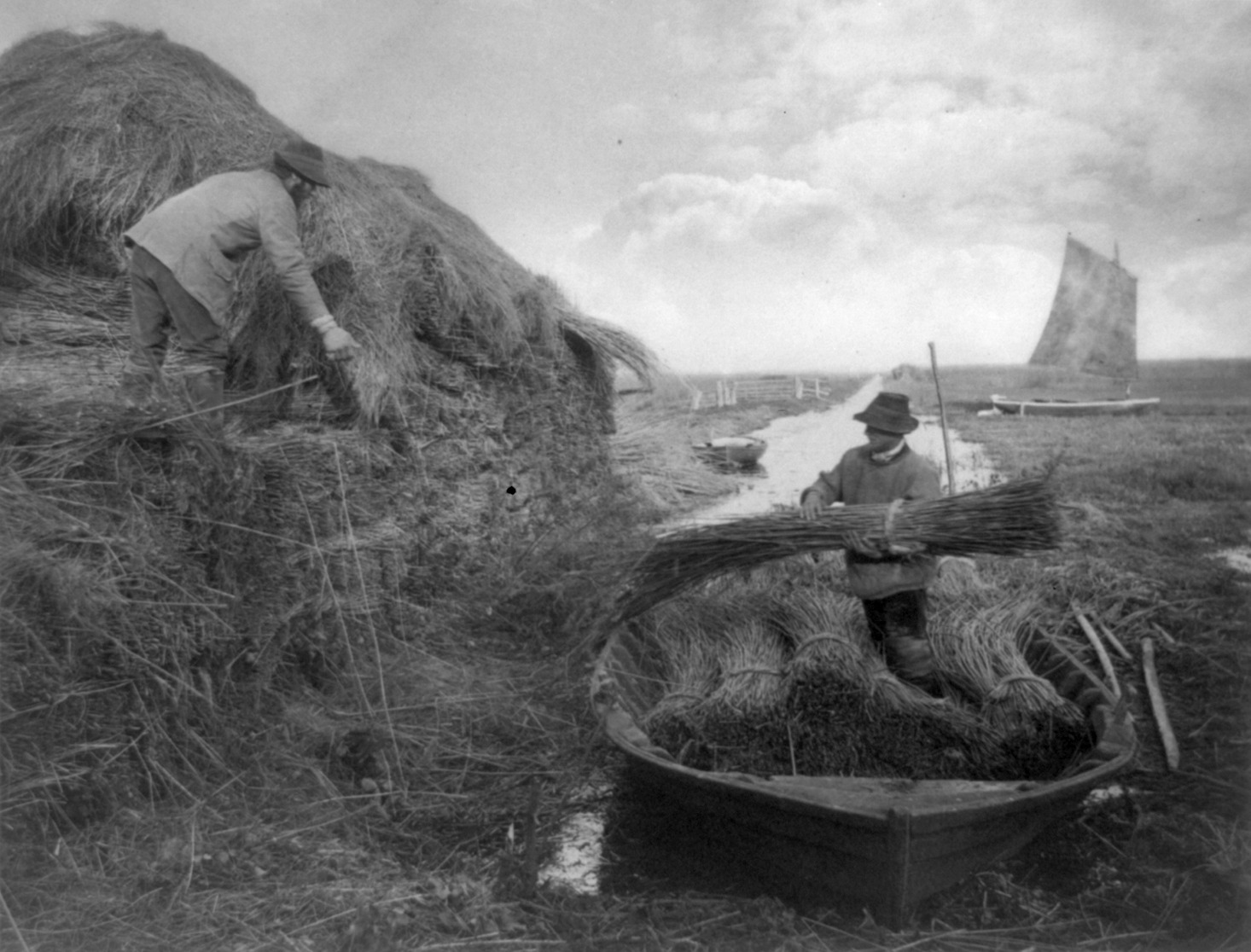
"Ricking the reed", from Emerson's first photographic album Life and Landscape on the Norfolk Broads (1886)

Peter Henry Emerson (13 May 1856 – 12 May 1936) was a British writer and photographer. His photographs are early examples of promoting straight photography as an art form. He is known for taking photographs that displayed rural settings and for his disputes with the photographic establishment about the purpose and meaning of photography.

== Biography ==
=== Early life ===
Emerson was born on La Palma Estate, a sugar plantation near Encrucijada, Cuba belonging to his American father, Henry Ezekiel Emerson and British mother, Jane, née Harris Billing. He was a distant relative of Samuel Morse and Ralph Waldo Emerson. He spent his early years in Cuba on his father's estate. During the American Civil War he spent some time at Wilmington, Delaware, but moved to England in 1869, after the death of his father. He was schooled at Cranleigh School where he was a noted scholar and athlete. He subsequently attended King's College London, before switching to Clare College, Cambridge in 1879 where he earned his medical degree in 1885.

Emerson was intelligent, well-educated and wealthy with a facility for clearly articulating his many strongly held opinions. In 1881 he married Miss Edith Amy Ainsworth and wrote his first book while on his honeymoon. The couple eventually had five children.

=== Photography ===
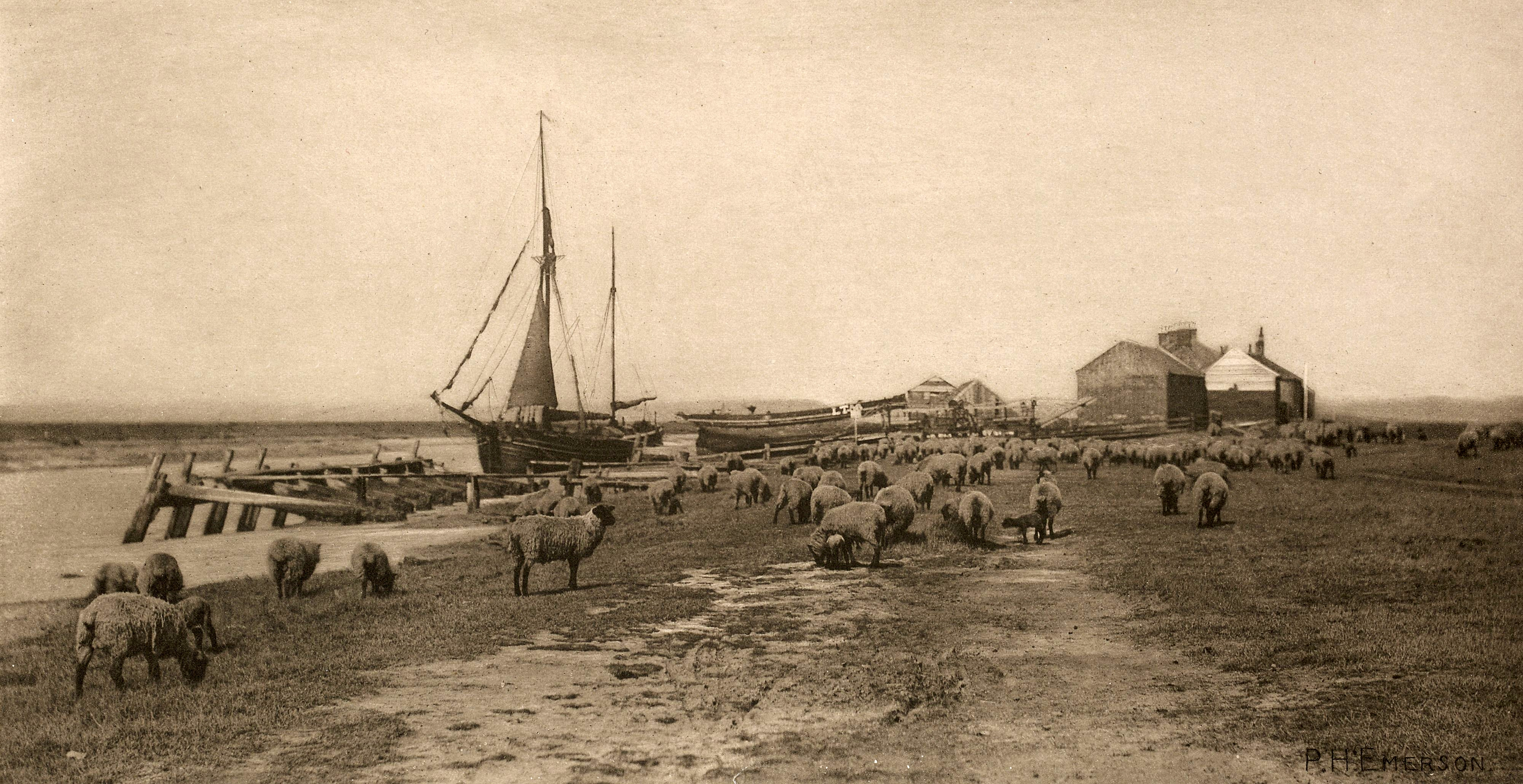
Blackshore, River Blythe, Suffolk from Emerson's illustrated book Pictures of East Anglian Life (1888)

He bought his first camera in 1881 or 1882 to be used as a tool on bird-watching trips with his friend, the ornithologist A. T. Evans. In 1885 he was involved in the formation of the Camera Club of London, and the following year he was elected to the Council of the Photographic Society and abandoned his career as a surgeon to become a photographer and writer. As well as his particular attraction to nature he was also interested in billiards, rowing and meteorology.

As I stood admiring just before sunrise, the reed-tops bending under their beautiful crystal heads, rooks came flying from a wood near by, and a vast flock of peewits darkened the sky. As the yellow sun arose in frosty splendour mists began to rise on the river, and there followed a brief spell of magic beauty ere the thickening mists began to bury everything as they blew in fitful gusts from the river.

— Emerson, in On English Lagoons (1893)

Initially influenced by naturalistic French painting, he argued for similarly "naturalistic" photography and took photographs in sharp focus to record country life as clearly as possible. His first album of photographs, published in 1886, was entitled Life and Landscape on the Norfolk Broads, and it consisted of 40 platinum prints that were informed by these ideas. Before long, however, he became dissatisfied with rendering everything in sharp focus, considering that the undiscriminating emphasis it gave to all objects was unlike the way the human eye saw the world.

He then experimented with soft focus, but was not content with the results that this gave too, experiencing difficulty with accurately recreating the depth and atmosphere which he saw as necessary to capture nature with precision. Despite his misgivings, he took many photographs of landscapes and rural life in the East Anglian fenlands and published seven further books of his photography through the next ten years. In the last two of these volumes, On English Lagoons (1893) and Marsh Leaves (1895), Emerson printed the photographs himself using photogravure, after having bad experiences with commercial printers.

=== 20th century ===
After the publication of Marsh Leaves in 1895, generally considered to be his best work, Emerson published no further photographs, though he continued writing and publishing books, both works of fiction and on such varied subjects as genealogy and billiards. In 1924, he started writing a history of artistic photography and completed the manuscript just before his death in Falmouth, Cornwall on 12 May 1936.

In 1979 he was inducted into the International Photography Hall of Fame.

== Disagreements with the photographic establishment ==
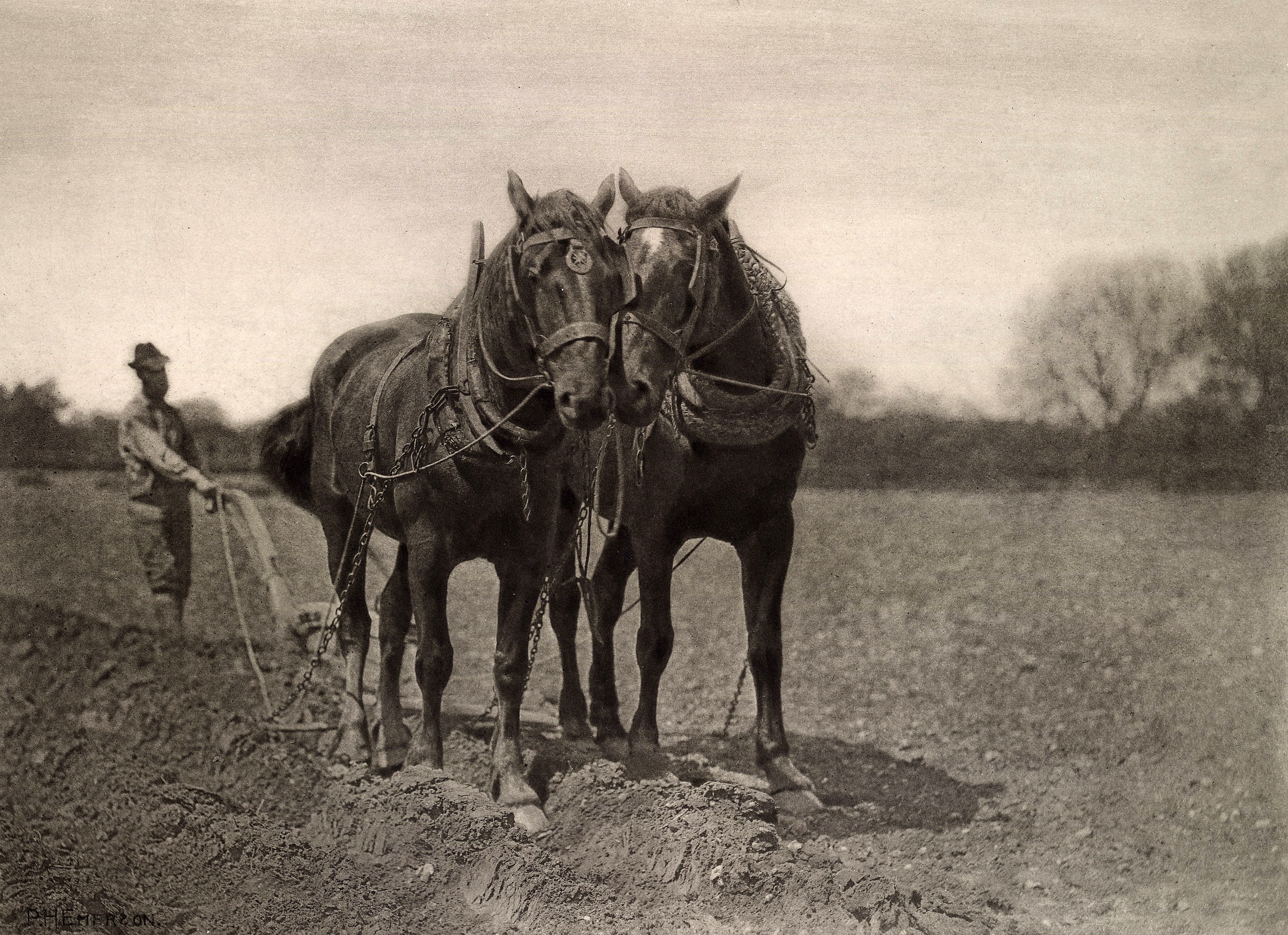
"At Plough, The End of the Furrow", from Emerson's photographic album Pictures From Life in Field And Fen (1887)

During his life Emerson fought against the British photographic establishment on a number of issues. In 1889 he published a controversial and influential book Naturalistic Photography for Students of the Art, in which he explained his philosophy of art and straightforward photography. The book was described by one writer as "the bombshell dropped at the tea party" because of the case it made that truthful and realistic photographs would replace contrived photography. This was a direct attack on the popular tradition of combining many photographs to produce one image that had been pioneered by O. G. Reijlander and Henry Peach Robinson in the 1850s. Some of Robinson's photographs were of twenty or more separate photographs combined to produce one image. This allowed the production of images that, especially in early days, could not have been produced indoors in low light, and it also made possible the creation of highly dramatic images, often in imitation of allegorical paintings. Emerson denounced this technique as false and claimed that photography should be seen as a genre of its own, not one that seeks to imitate other art forms.

All Emerson's own pictures were taken in a single shot and without retouching, which was another form of manipulation that he strongly disagreed with, calling it "the process by which a good, bad, or indifferent photograph is converted into a bad drawing or painting".

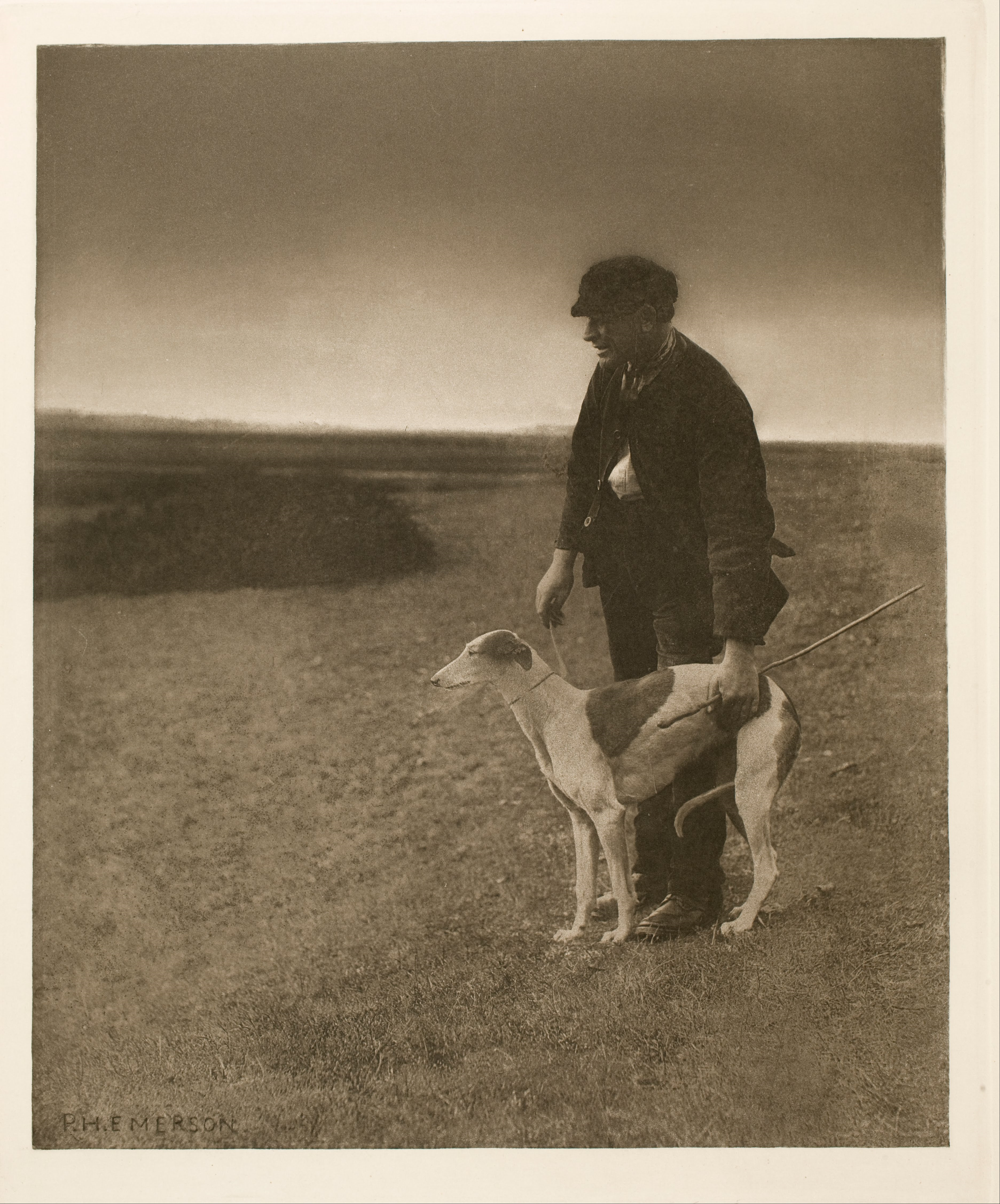
From Emerson's album The Hunters depicting a hunter and his dog sourced from Nancy Newhall's book P.H. Emerson

Emerson also believed that the photograph should be a true representation of that which the eye saw. Following contemporary optical theories, he produced photographs with one area of sharp focus while the remainder was unsharp. He vehemently pursued this argument about the nature of seeing and its representation in photography, to the discomfort of the photographic establishment.

Another of Emerson's passionate beliefs was that photography was an art and not a mechanical reproduction. An argument with the establishment ensued on this point as well, but Emerson found that his defence of photography as art failed, and he had to allow that photography was probably a form of mechanical reproduction. The pictures the Robinson school produced may have been "mechanical", but Emerson's may still be considered artistic, since they were not faithful reproductions of a scene but rather having depth as a result of his one-plane-sharp theory. When he lost the argument over the artistic nature of photography, Emerson did not publicize his photographic work but still continued to take photographs.

== Publications ==
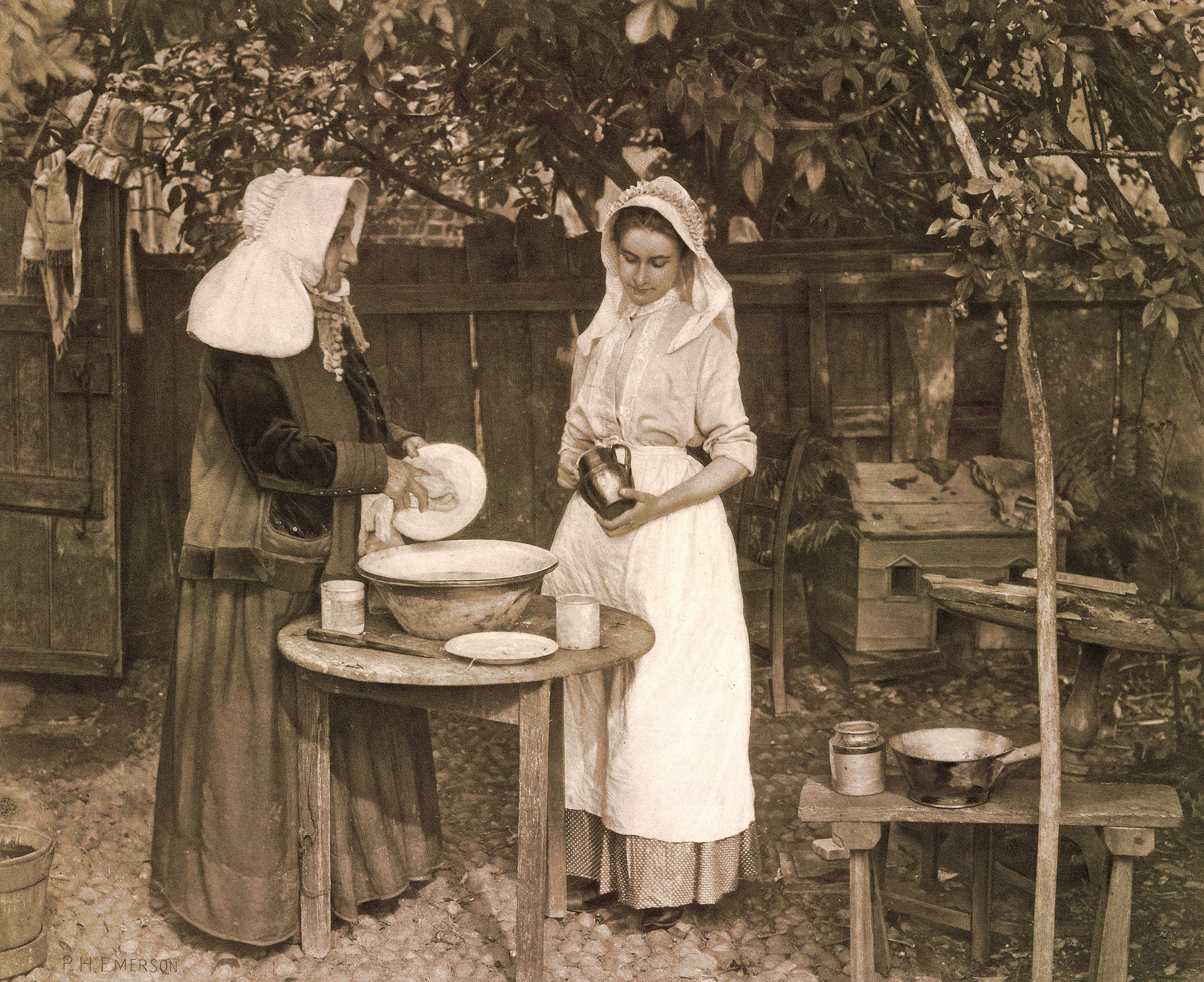
Confessions from Emerson's book Pictures From Life in Field And Fen (1887)

- Paul Ray at the Hospital: a Picture of Student Life (1882, privately published)
- Life and Landscape on the Norfolk Broads (1886)
- Pictures from Life in Field and Fen (1887)
- The Compleat Angler, or, The Contemplative Man's Recreation. Being a Discourse of Rivers, Fish-Ponds, Fish, and Fishing by Izaak Walton with photogravures by Emerson (1888)
- Idylls of the Norfolk Broads (1888)
- Pictures of East Anglian Life (1888)
- Naturalistic Photography for Students of the Art (1889)
- Wild Life on a Tidal Water (1890)
- On English Lagoons (1893)
- Birds, Beasts and Fishes of the Norfolk Broadland (1895)
- Marsh Leaves (1895)
- Caóba, the Guerilla Chief. A Real Romance of the Cuban Rebellion (1897)
- The English Emersons, a genealogical historical sketch to the end of the 17th century (1898)
- Suggested Amended Billiard Rules for Amateur Players (1908)
