= Victorian headless portrait =

Photography genre

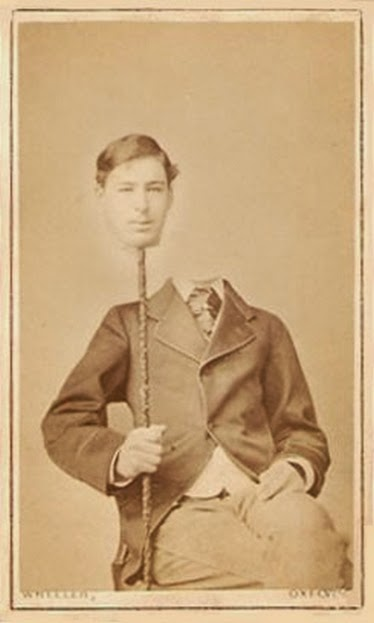
William Henry Wheeler. Headless portrait, circa 1875.

Victorian headless portraits were a fad in Britain in the late 19th century. In the photographs, the model's head appears separated from the body; often the sitter holds it in their own hands. Although this genre is called headless portraiture, it is the head that is always present in the photograph, and the body may be absent.

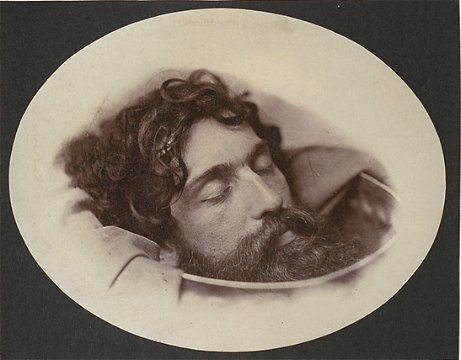
Head of St. John the Baptist in a Charger by Oscar Gustave Rejlander, circa 1858

An early example of the genre is photographer Oscar Gustave Rejlander's Head of St. John the Baptist in a Charger, a print made by combining two different negatives. The photograph dates from somewhere between 1855 and 1860. Photographer Henry Peach Robinson described Reilander's insistence on finding a model for John the Baptist saying that "Rejlander saw his head on the shoulders of a gentleman in the town. …The curious thing is, that he did not so much see the modern gentleman as always the picture which the head suggested. It was some months before the artist ventured to ask the model to lend his head … and years before he obtained his consent."

Many later photographers created similar images of men and women with severed heads, depicted held in their hands, laid on a platter or held aloft by the hair. Often in the other hand, the sitter carries the weapon of their own murder. The demand for such photographs was so high that many Victorian photographers openly advertised this particular type of photography.

The most prolific photographer in this genre was British photographer Samuel Kay Balbirnie, who ran advertisements in the Brighton Daily News offering "HEADLESS PHOTOGRAPHS - Ladies and Gentlemen taken showing their heads floating in the air or in their laps."

== Gallery ==
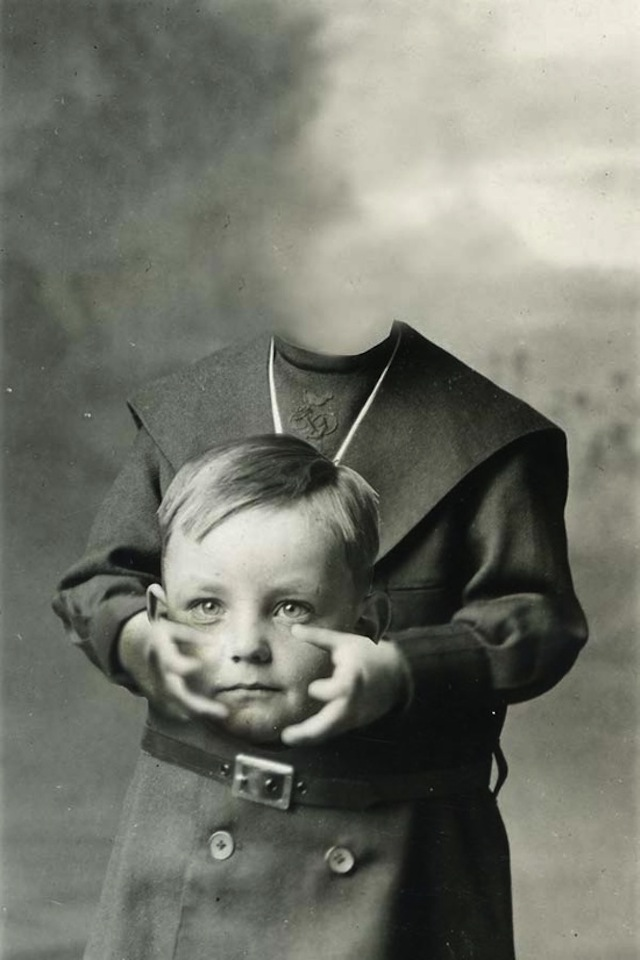
Unknown photographer, 1890. Headless boy portrait.

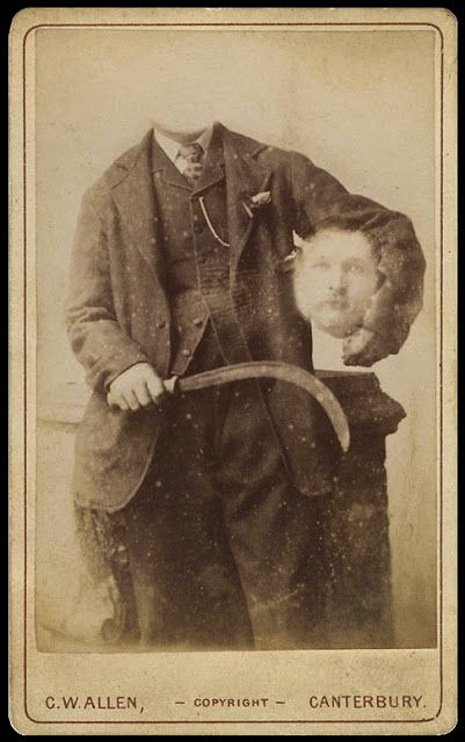
Charles William Allen (1818-1889), Canterbury. Headless portrait, 1880s.

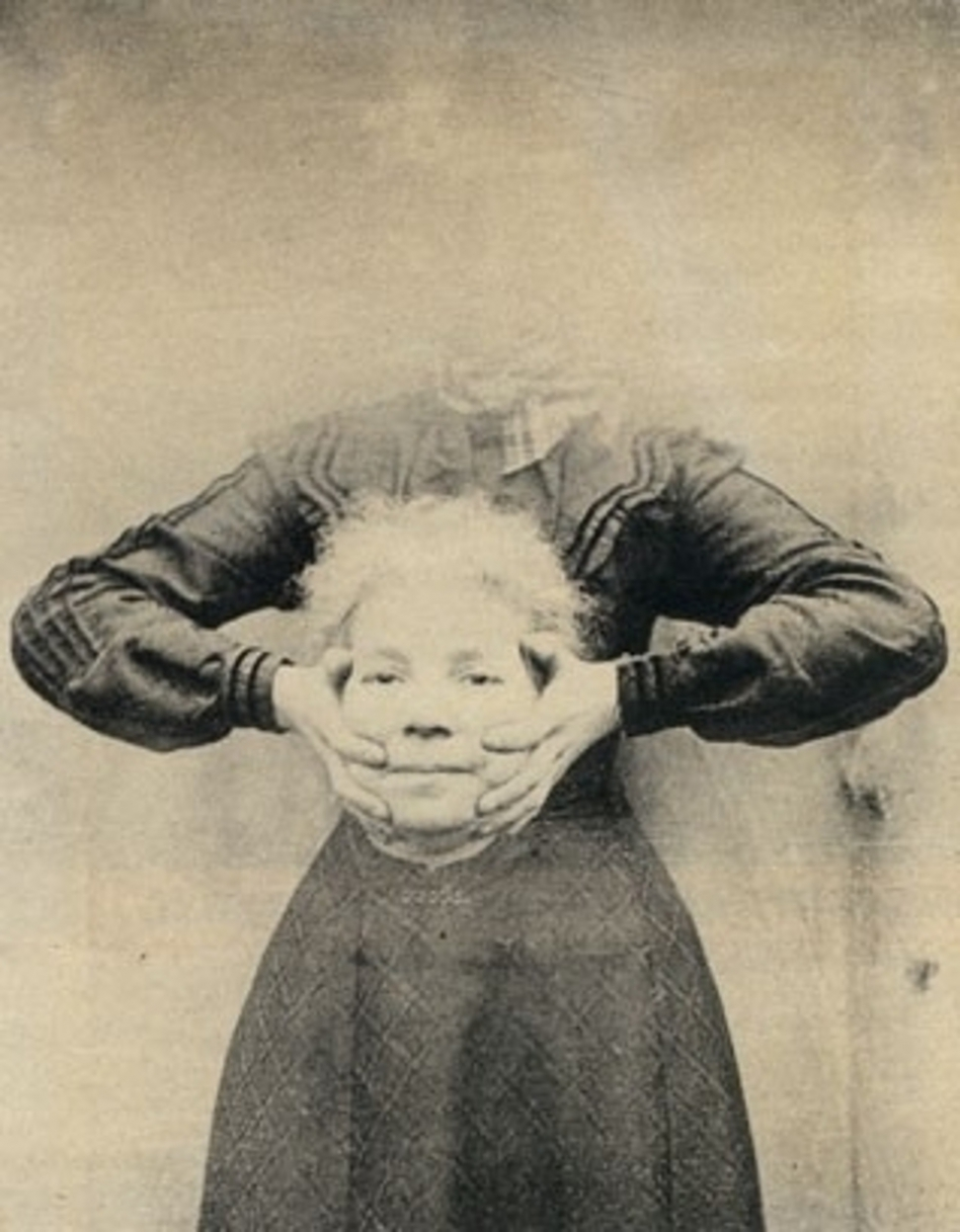
Unknown photographer, UK. Headless woman, 1900.

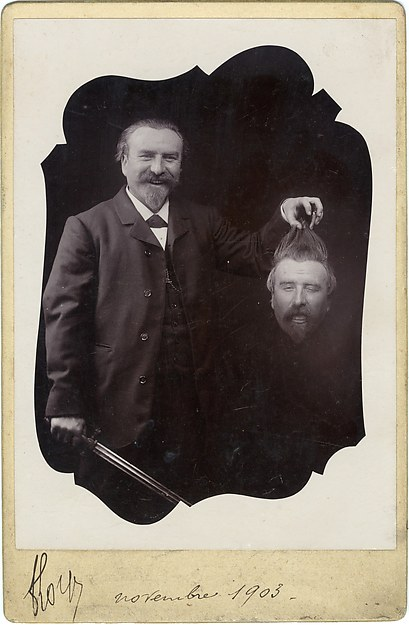
Unknown photographer (France). A bearded man holds his severed head in his hand, 1899.

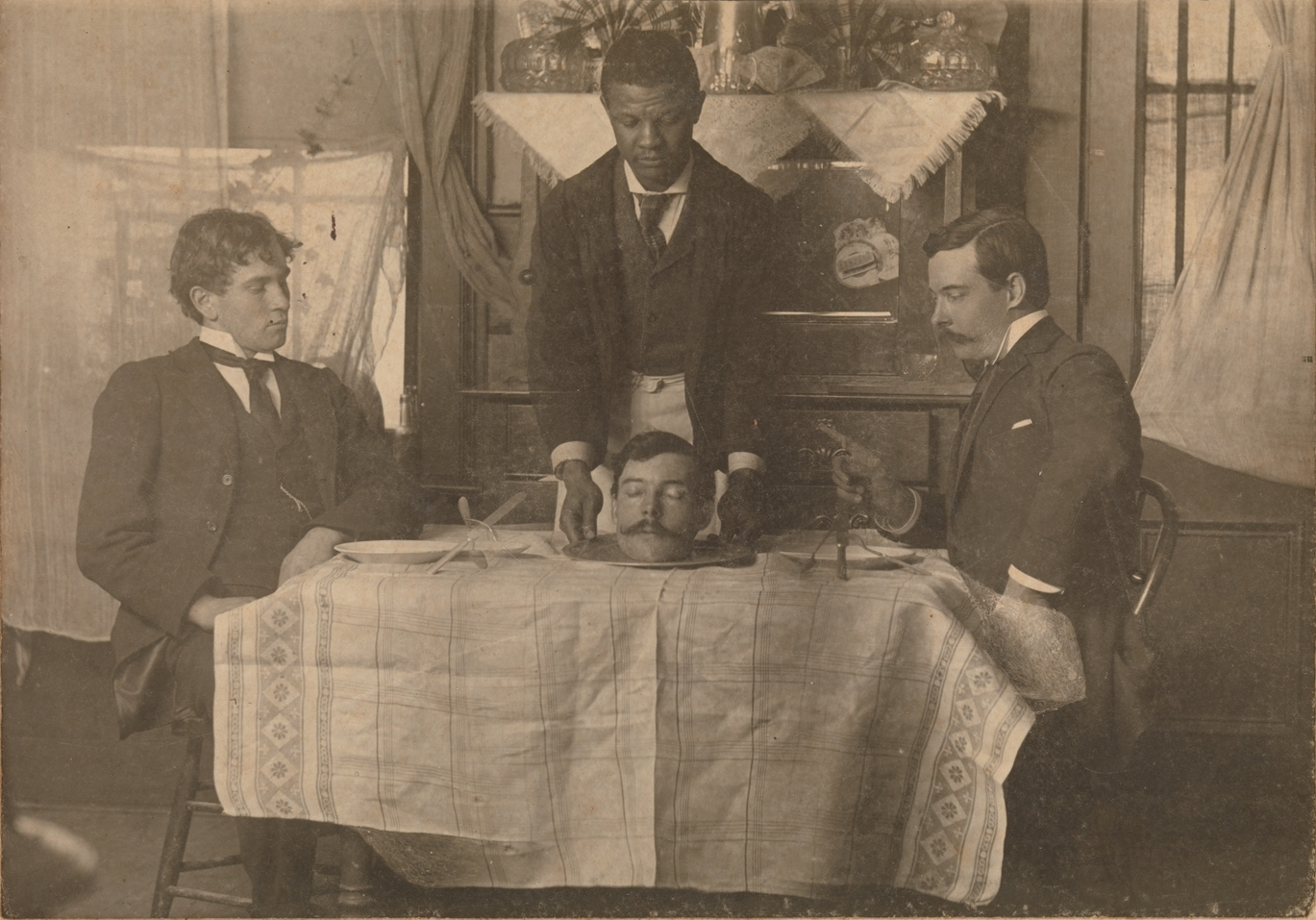
William Robert Bowles (1861-1918). Servant serving his head on a plate, circa 1900
