= Multiple exposure =

Superimposition of two or more exposures to create a single image

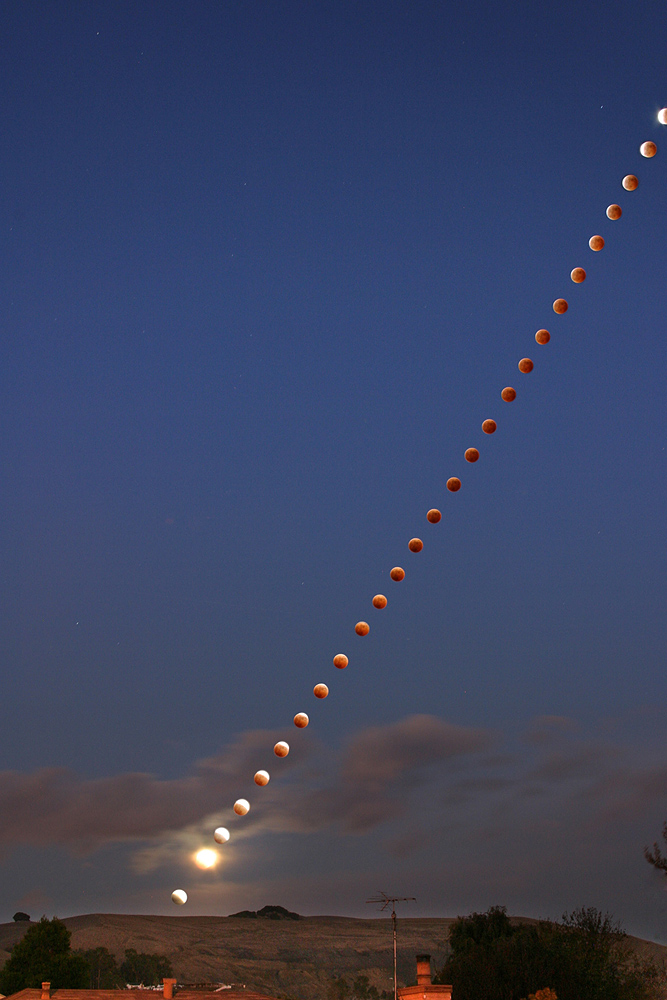
A multi-exposure composite image of the October 2004 lunar eclipse taken from Hayward, California

In photography and cinematography, a multiple exposure is the superimposition of two or more exposures to create a single image, and double exposure has a corresponding meaning in respect of two images. The exposure values may or may not be identical to each other.

== Overview ==
Ordinarily, cameras have a sensitivity to light that is a function of time. For example, a one-second exposure is an exposure in which the camera image is equally responsive to light over the exposure time of one second. The criterion for determining that something is a double exposure is that the sensitivity goes up and then back down. The simplest example of a multiple exposure is a double exposure without flash, i.e. two partial exposures are made and then combined into one complete exposure. Some single exposures, such as "flash and blur" use a combination of electronic flash and ambient exposure. This effect can be approximated by a Dirac delta measure (flash) and a constant finite rectangular window, in combination. For example, a sensitivity window comprising a Dirac comb combined with a rectangular pulse, is considered a multiple exposure, even though the sensitivity never goes to zero during the exposure.

== Historical multiple exposure photography ==
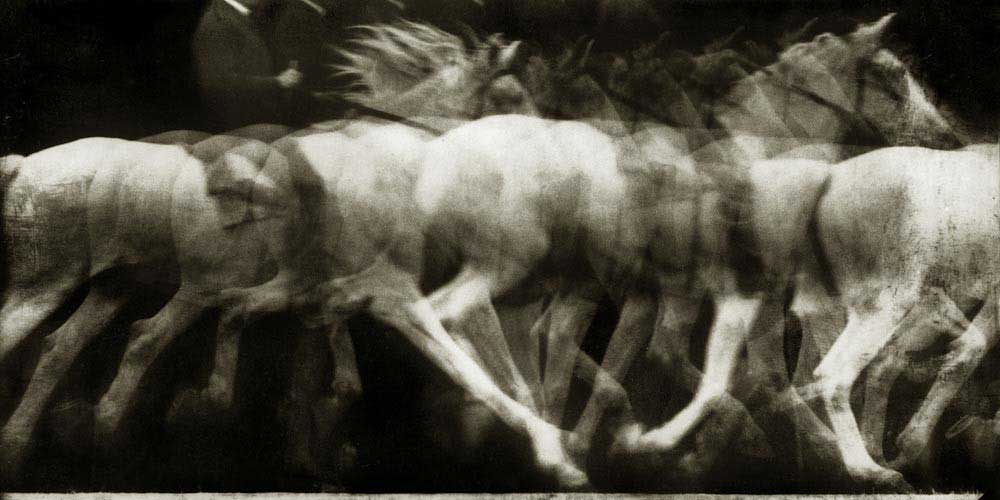
An 1886 chronophotographic study of horse motion, by Etienne-Jules Marey

In the historical technique of chronophotography, dating back to the Victorian era, a series of instantaneous photographs were taken at short and equal intervals of time. These photographs could be overlaid for a single multiple exposure print.

== Multiple exposure techniques ==
=== Analogue ===
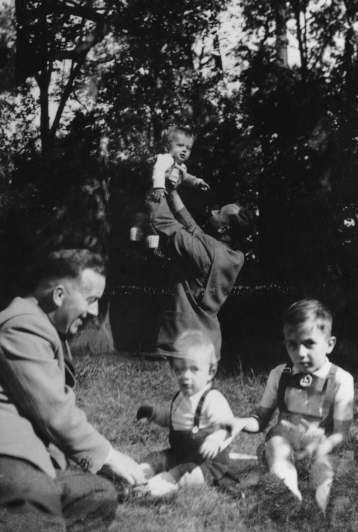
Double exposure photograph

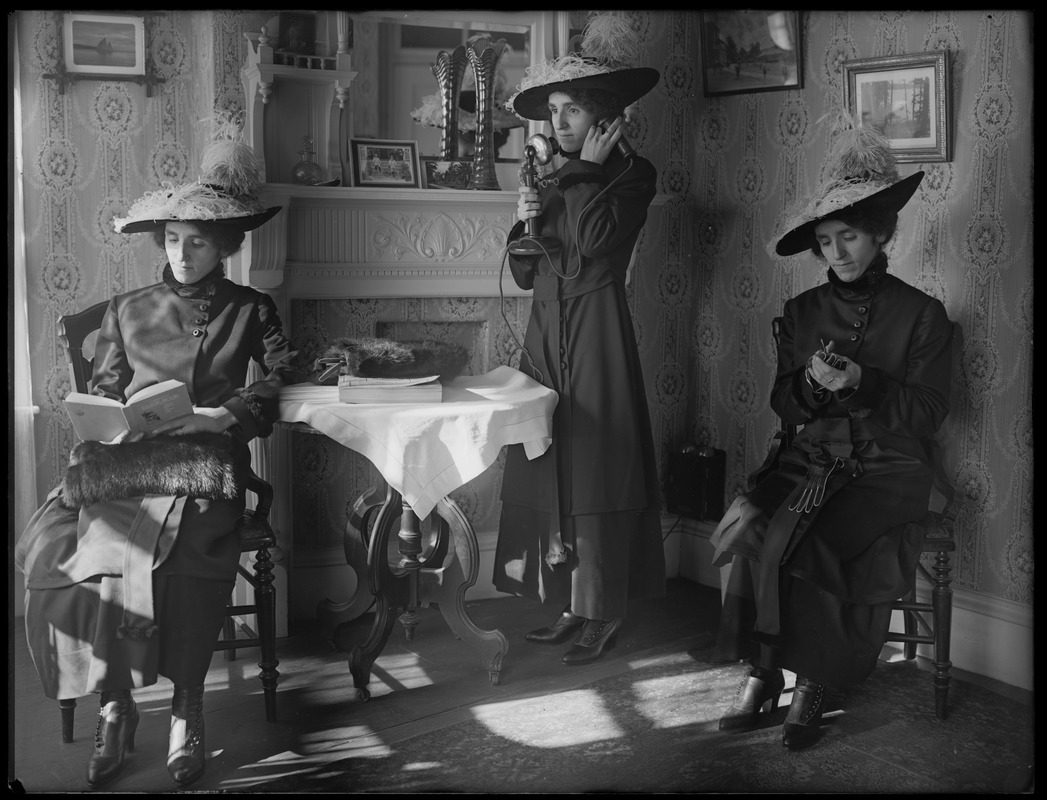
Triple exposure photograph from 1915

In photography and cinematography, multiple exposure is a technique in which the camera shutter is opened more than once to expose the film multiple times, usually to different images. The resulting image contains the subsequent image/s superimposed over the original. The technique is sometimes used as an artistic visual effect and can be used to create ghostly images or to add people and objects to a scene that were not originally there. It is frequently used in photographic hoaxes.

It is considered easiest to have a manual winding camera for double exposures. On automatic winding cameras, as soon as a picture is taken the film is typically wound to the next frame. Some more advanced automatic winding cameras have the option for multiple exposures but it must be set before making each exposure. Manual winding cameras with a multiple exposure feature can be set to double-expose after making the first exposure.

Since shooting multiple exposures will expose the same frame multiple times, negative exposure compensation must first be set to avoid overexposure. For example, to expose the frame twice with correct exposure, a −1 EV compensation have to be done, and −2 EV for exposing four times. This may not be necessary when photographing a lit subject in two (or more) different positions against a perfectly dark background, as the background area will be essentially unexposed.

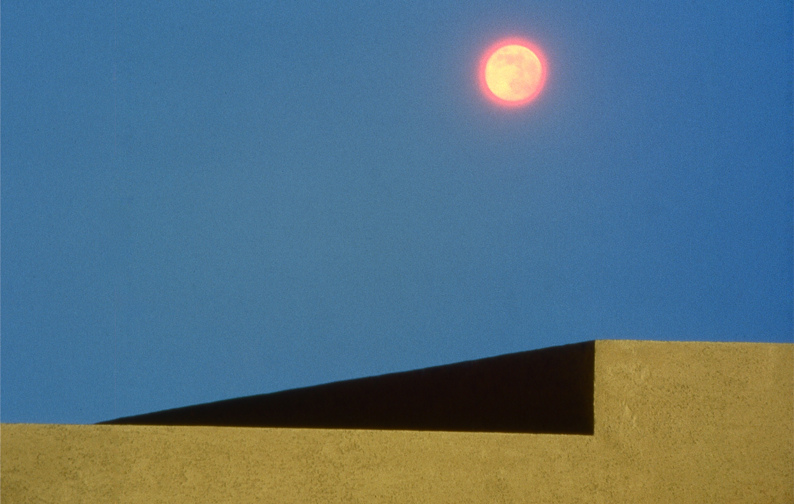
A photo by Augusto De Luca made using double exposure

Medium to low light is ideal for double exposures. A tripod may not be necessary if combining different scenes in one shot. In some conditions, for example, recording the whole progress of a lunar eclipse in multiple exposures, a stable tripod is essential.

More than two exposures can be combined, with care not to overexpose the film.

In the mid-1970s, Italian photographer Augusto De Luca specialized in the double exposure technique. With a first shot, he captured a setting sun or a moon at night, both characterized by very intense light. By underexposing the shot, the remaining part of the surrounding film remained black (unexposed). Then, with a second shot on the black part of the same frame, he photographed architectural elements. The final result was a realistic image with a metaphysical atmosphere.

== Adoption in fine art ==
In addition to direct photographic usage of the technique, fine artists' work has been inspired by the multiple exposure effect. Examples include Joan Semmel's oil on canvas Transitions from 2012, and Ian Hornak's acrylic on canvas Hanna Tillich's Mirror: Rembrandt's Three Trees Transformed Into The Expulsion From Eden, from 1978 (depicted below).

== Long exposures ==
With traditional film cameras, a long exposure is a single exposure, whereas with electronic cameras a long exposure can be obtained by integrating together many exposures. This averaging also permits there to be a time-windowing function, such as a Gaussian, that weights time periods near the center of the exposure time more strongly. Another possibility for synthesizing long exposure from a multiple exposure is to use an exponential decay in which the current frame has the strongest weight, and previous frames are faded out with a sliding exponential window.

== Scanning film with multiple exposure ==
Multiple exposure technique can also be used when scanning transparencies like slides, film or negatives using a film scanner for increasing dynamic range. With multiple exposure the original gets scanned several times with different exposure intensities. An overexposed scan lights the shadow areas of the image and enables the scanner to capture more image information here. Afterwards the data can be calculated into a single HDR image with increased dynamic range.

Among the scanning software solutions which implement multiple exposure are VueScan and SilverFast.

== Further examples ==
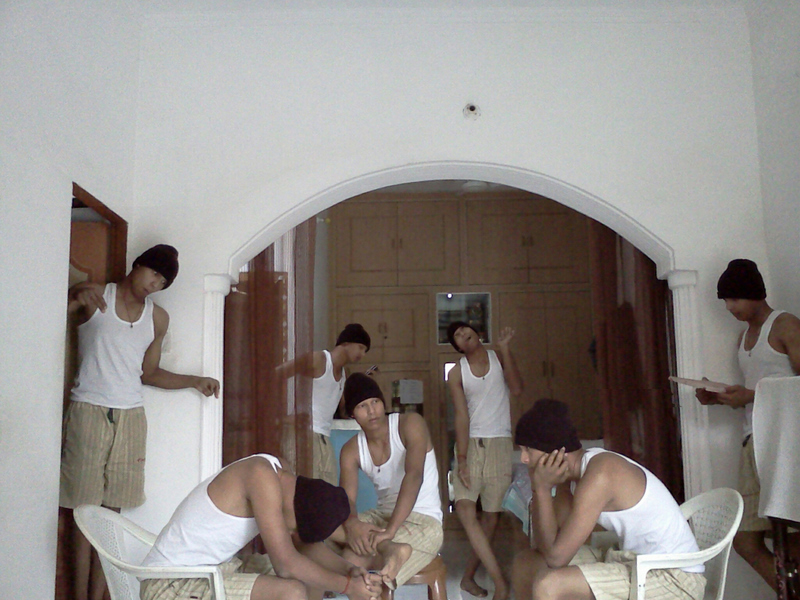
Multiple exposure image made using a digital camera and Adobe Photoshop

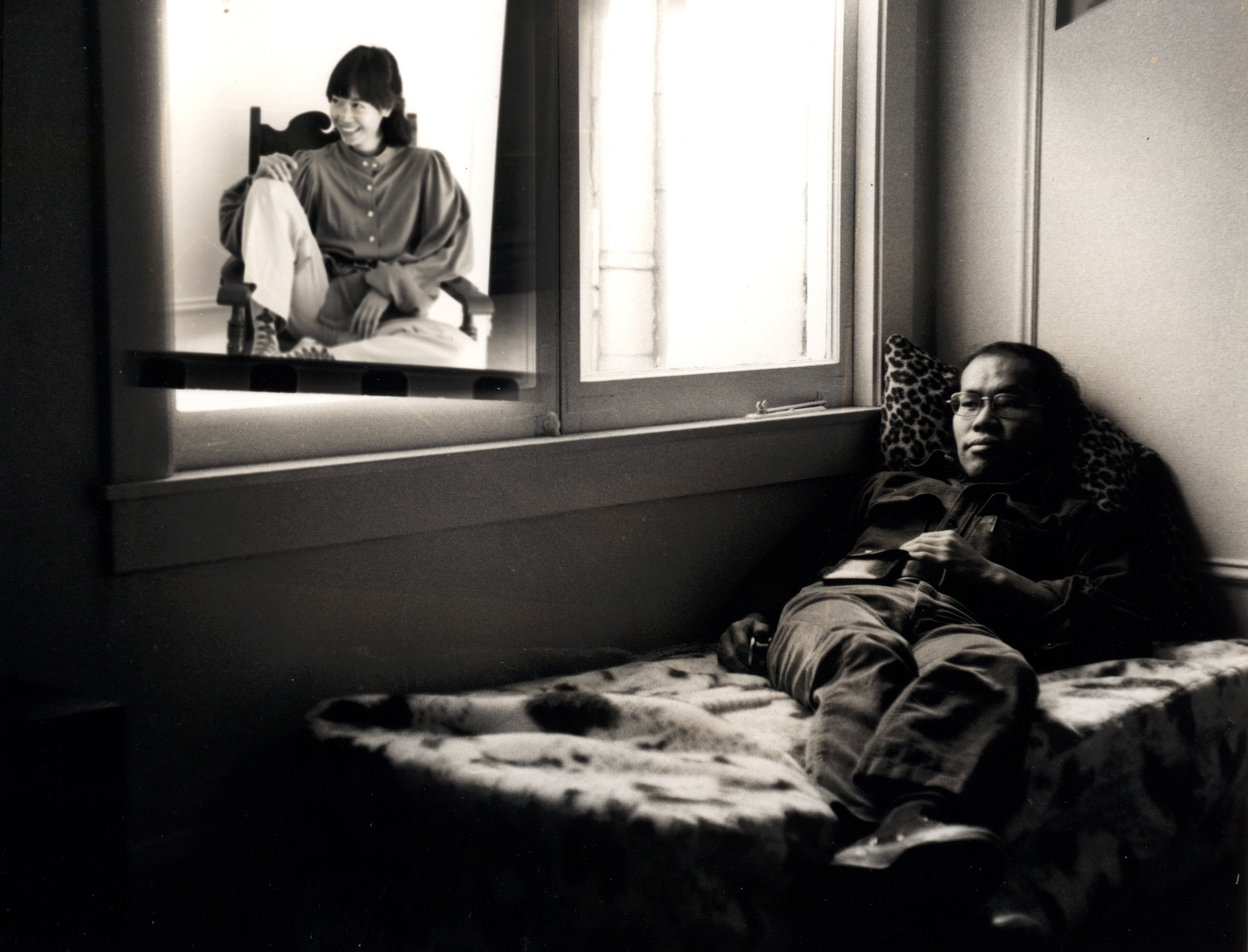
Multiple exposure film photo made in the darkroom

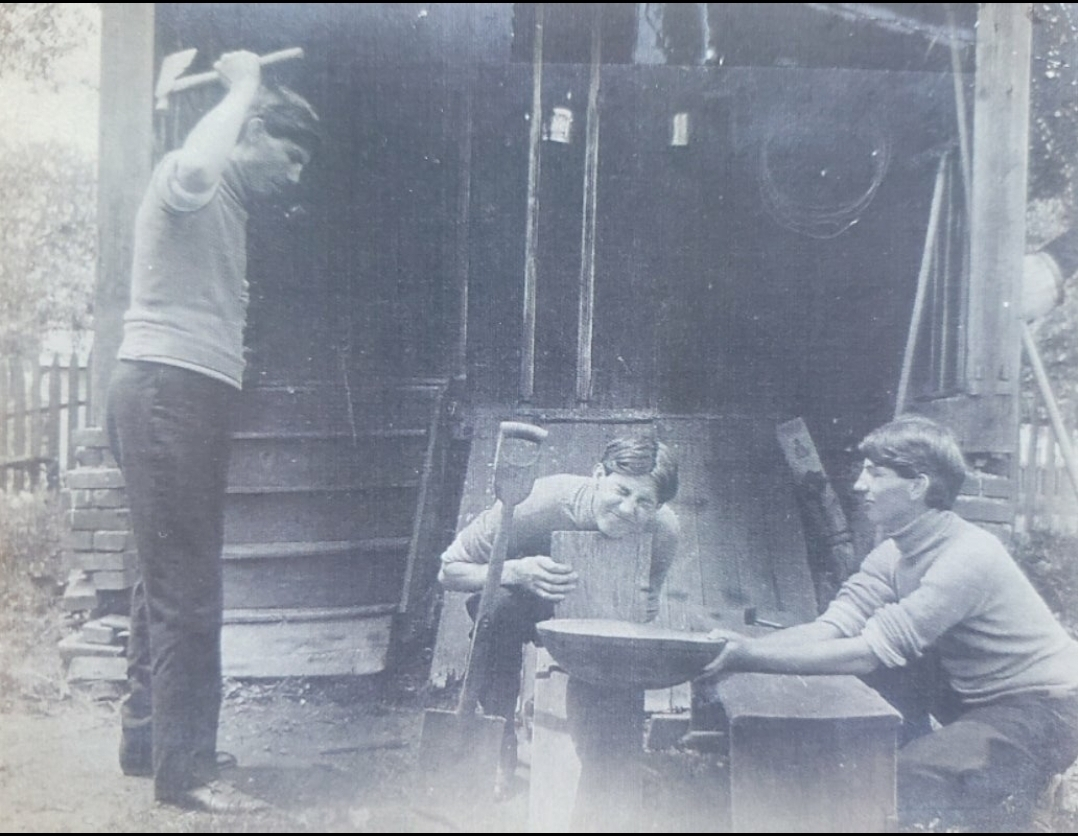
Multiple exposure image made in 1910

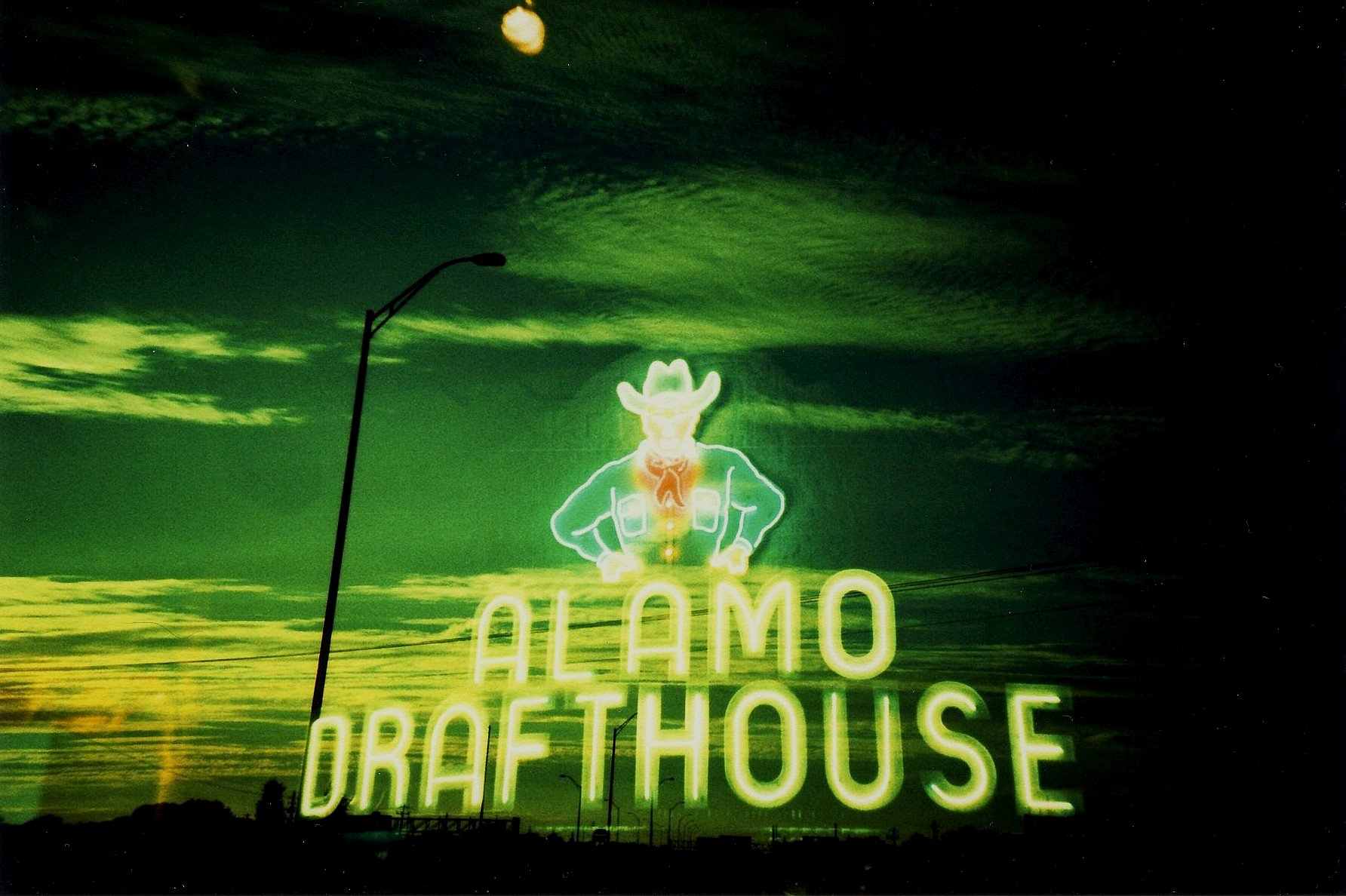
Multiple exposure made using a Lomography LC-A camera and cross-processed Fujichrome slide film

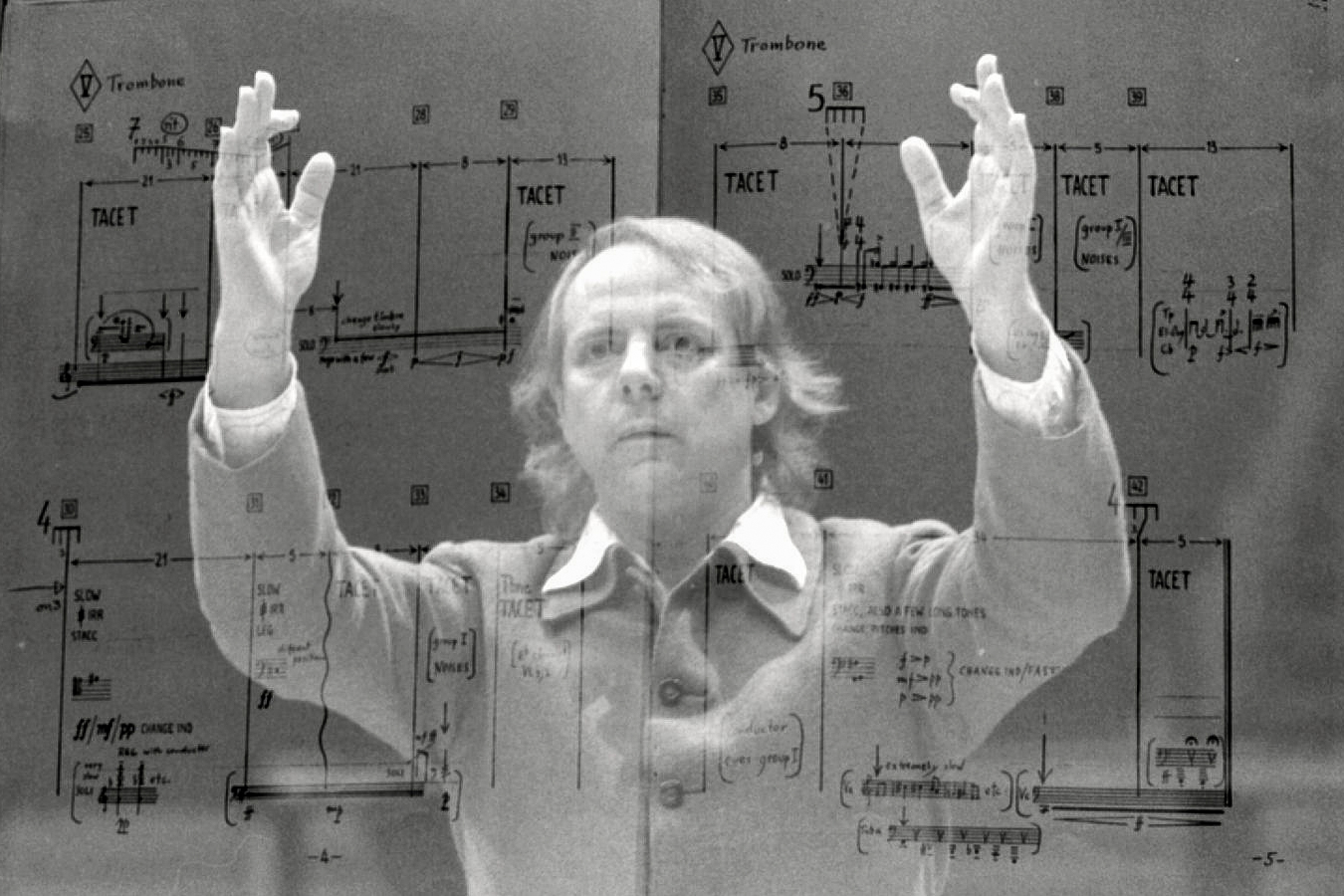
Composer Karlheinz Stockhausen, double exposure made using a film camera, 1980

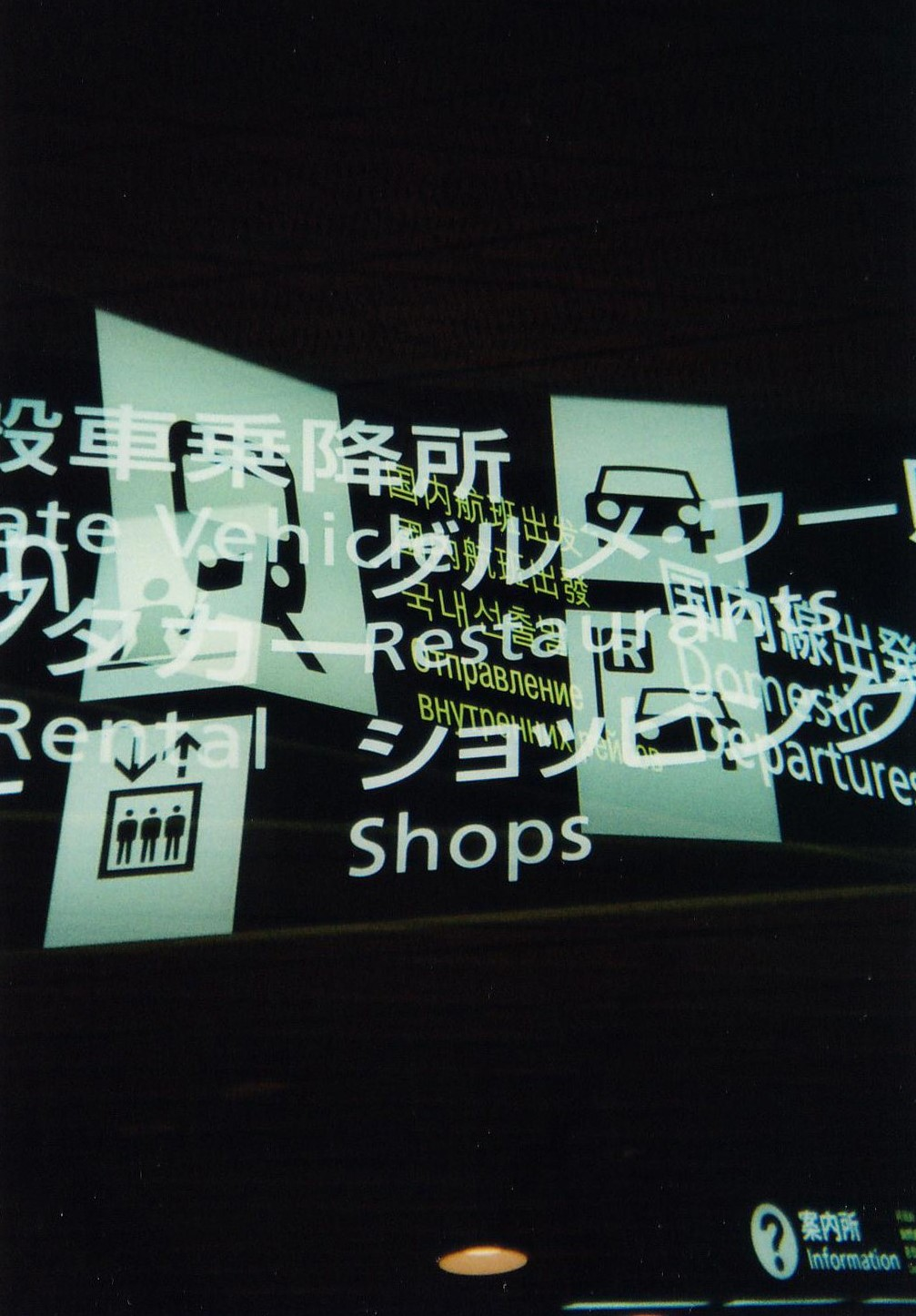
Double exposure image made at New Chitose Airport

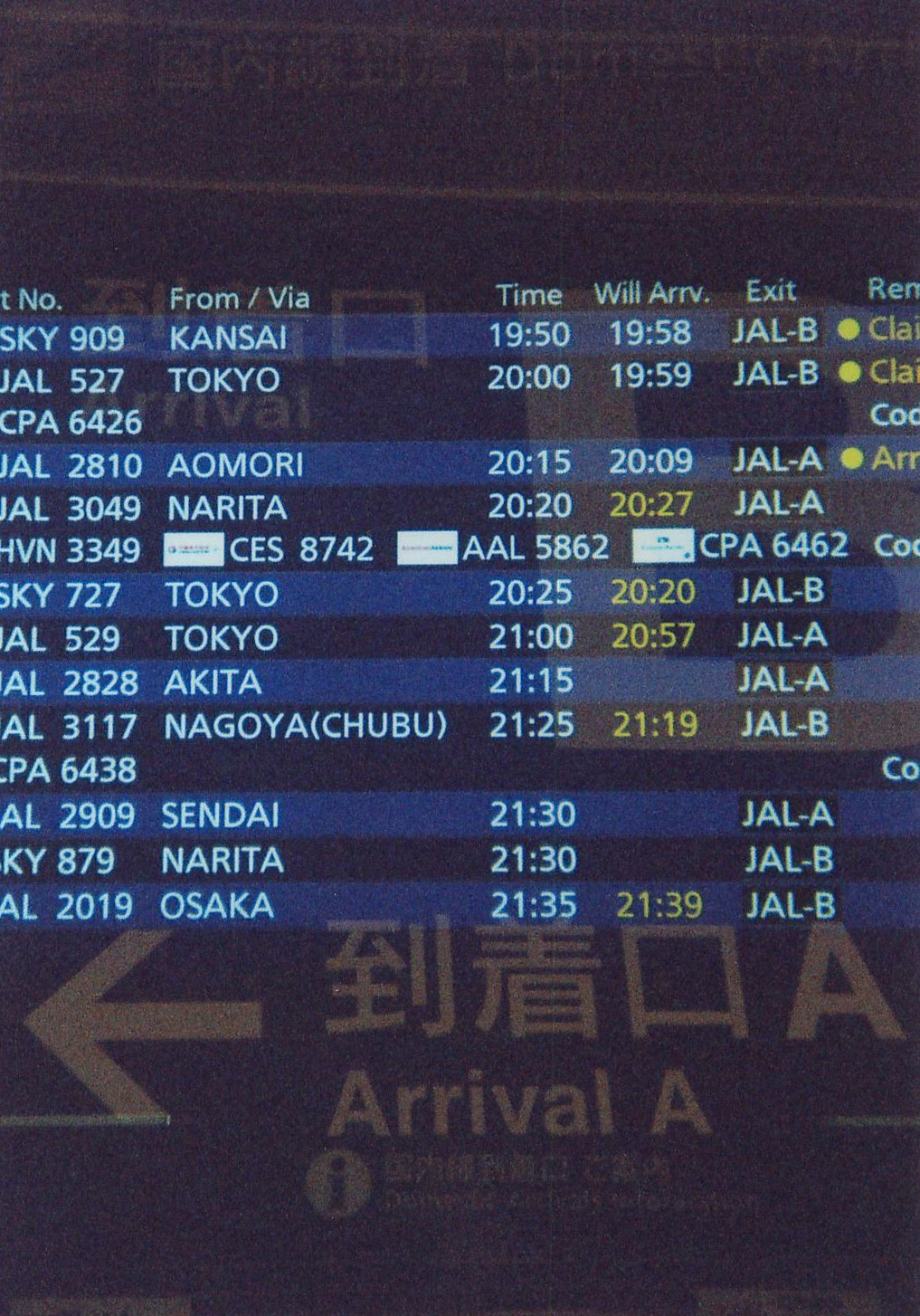
Double exposure image made at New Chitose Airport

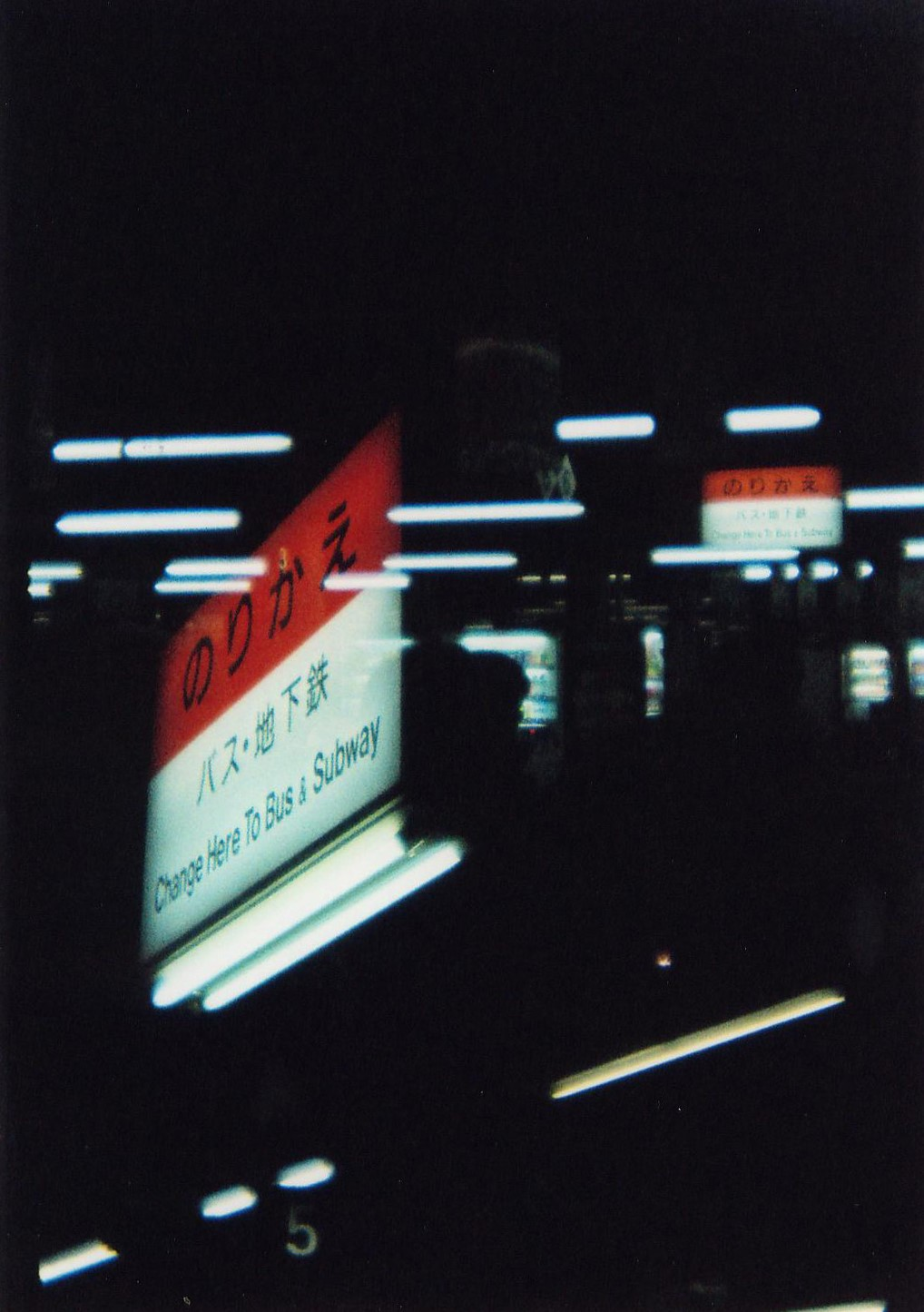
Double exposure image made at Sapporo Station

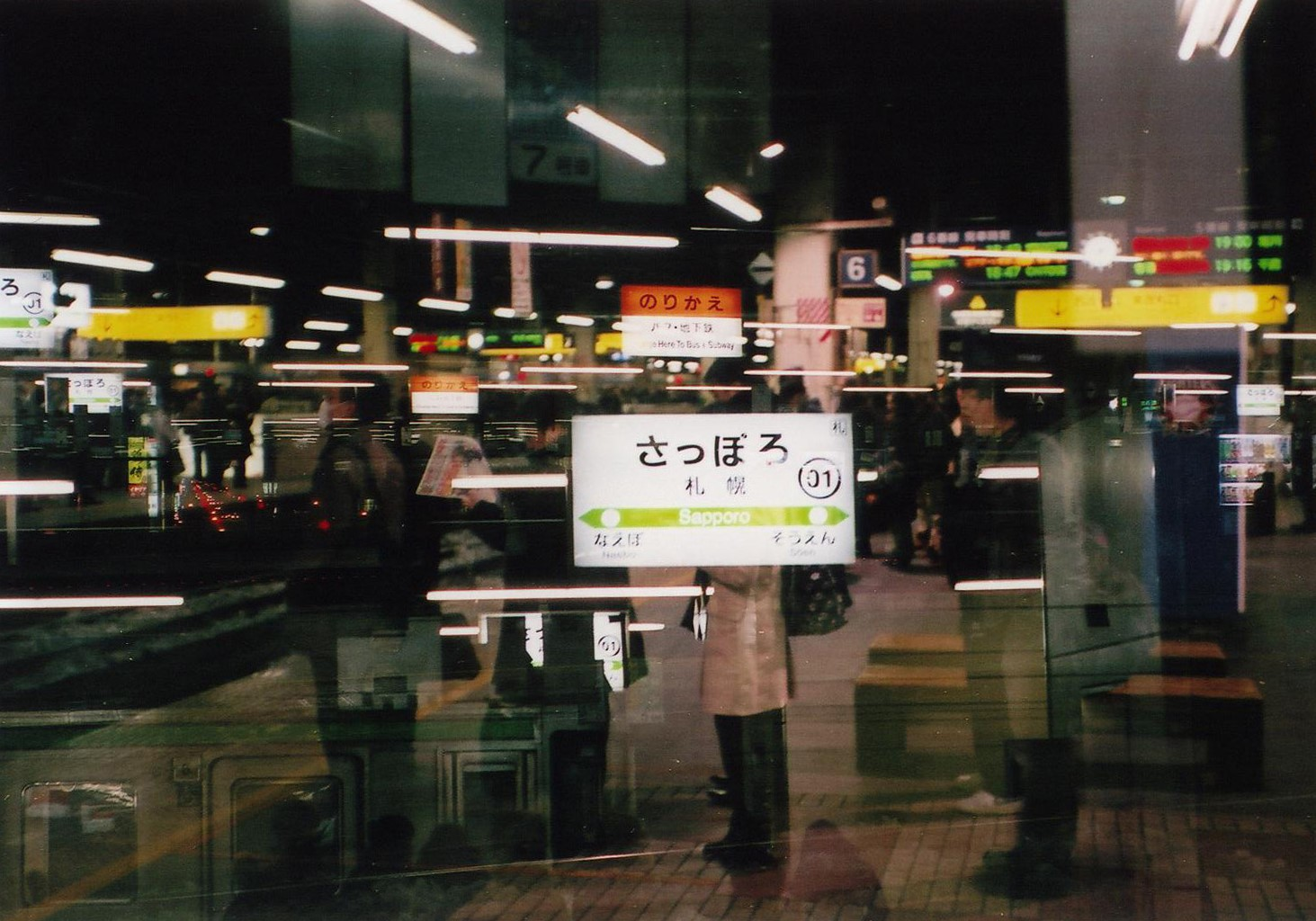
Double exposure image made at Sapporo Station

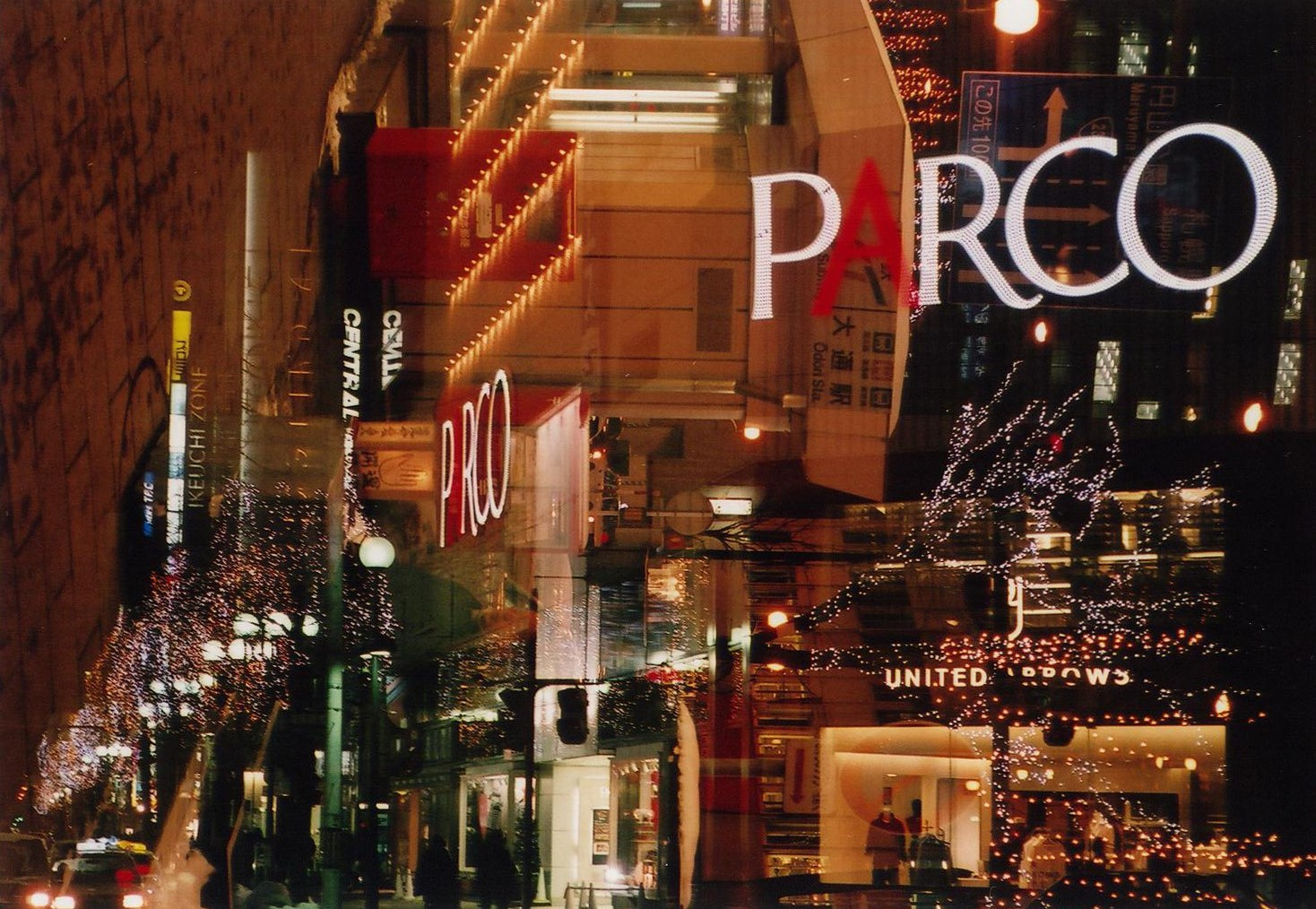
Double exposure image made in Sapporo

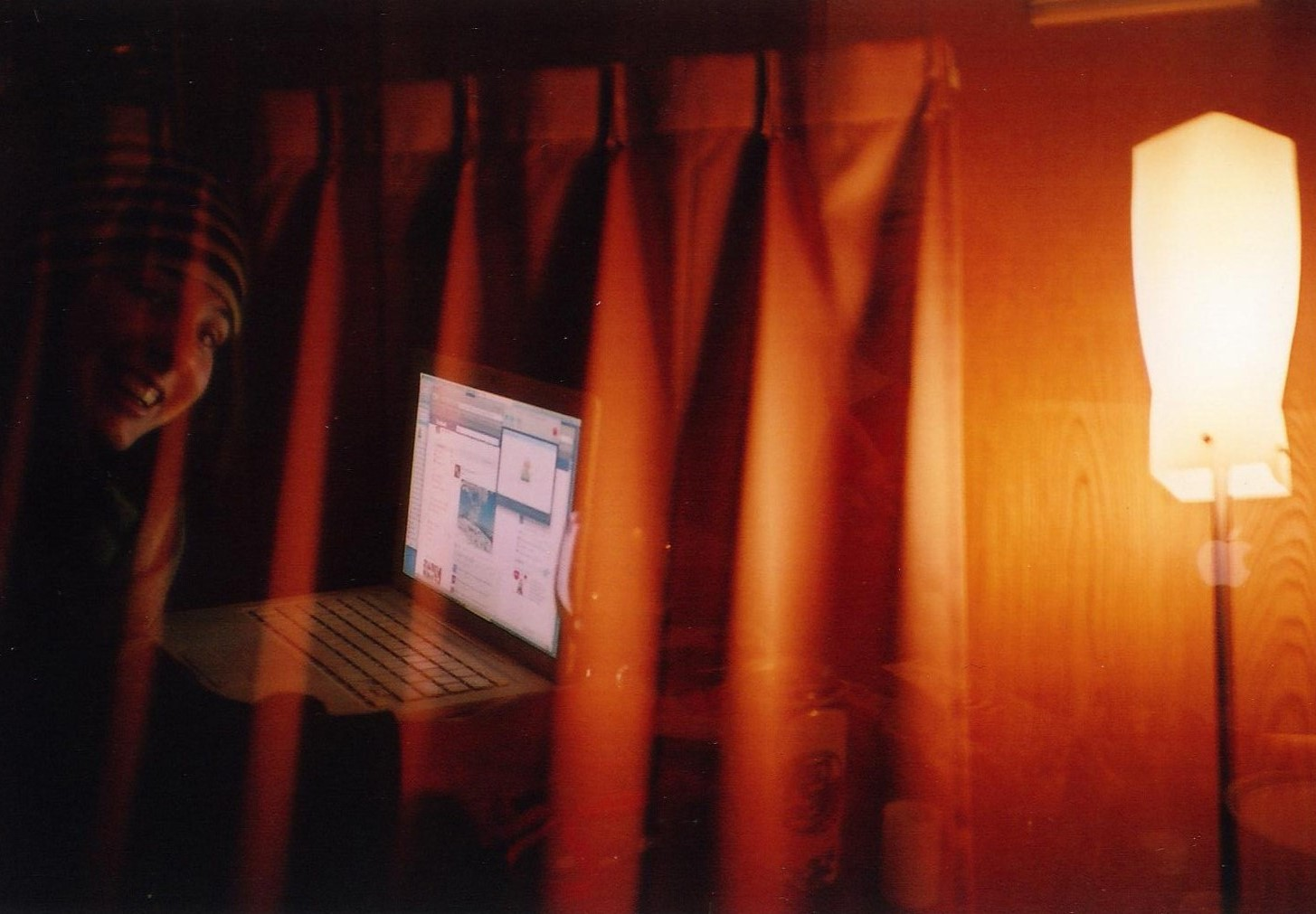
Double exposure image

Double exposure from The Man With the Rubber Head

== See also ==
- Autobracketing
- Bracketing
- Chroma key
- Sandwich printing
- Victorian headless portrait
