= Combination printing =

Creating one image from several negatives

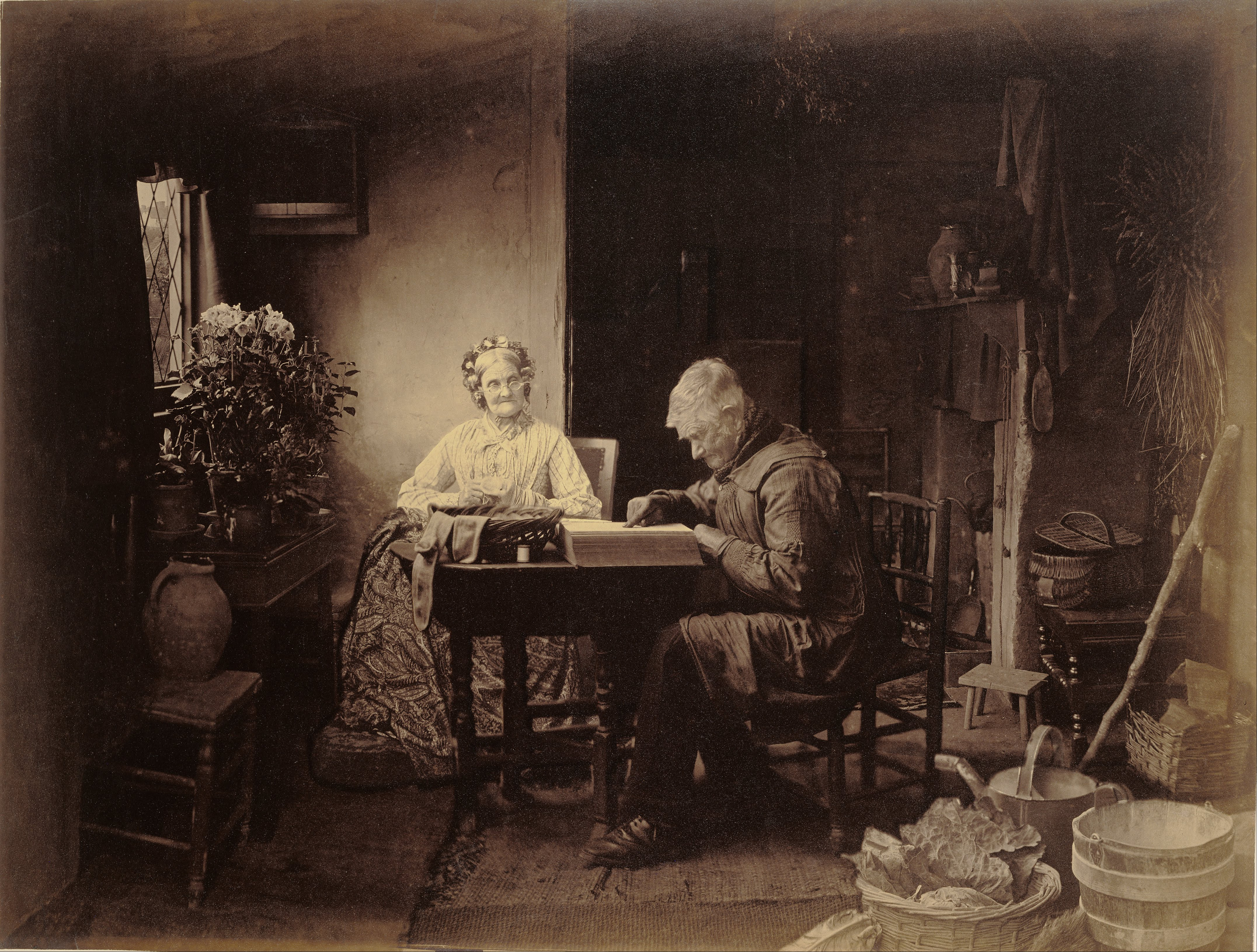
Henry Peach Robinson's When the Day's Work is Done, 1877. A combination print made from six different negatives.

Combination printing is a photographic technique of using the negatives of two or more images in conjunction with one another to create a single image.

Similar to dual-negative landscape photography, combination printing was technically much more complex. The concept of combination printing stemmed from the desire to create more of a fine art within photography and often more idealized images.

Combination printing was popular in the mid-19th century due to the limitations of the negative's light sensitivity and camera technology. For example, the long exposures required at the time to create an image would properly expose the main subject, such as a building, but would completely overexpose the sky. The sky would then lack detail, usually appearing as solid white. Hippolyte Bayard, a French photographer, was the first to suggest combining two separate negatives, one of the subject matter and one of a properly exposed negative of clouds, to create a balanced photograph.

The technique was also used to create new, original compositions and provided new ways for photographers to be more creative with their work.

Later on, the technique paved the way for yet another artistic process, photomontage.

== Process ==
Combination printing uses two or more negatives to make one print.

Combination printing required a lot of careful work to plan out the concept of what the final image was desired to look like. It was also a task of great skill and patience. When a photographer wished to create a combination print, issues of good exposures, scaling the subjects to match up, and consistent lighting were all essentials if they aimed to make it look as realistic as possible.

For instance, in the example of combining a foreground subject with adding clouds to a sky, it is important to make sure that the direction of the light falling on the clouds is the same as the light used on the main subject in the original foreground negative.

In actually exposing the negatives to combine them, the photographer must control the exposure of the portion of the initial photo that they will be adding to or replacing. Therefore, for adding clouds into the sky, the photographer would have to hold back light from the sky area and expose the foreground area. Then, when printing the negative of the clouds, do the opposite and only expose the cloud and sky portion of the photo. After this, they would be able to combine the two negatives by blending them together.

== History ==
Photographers such as William Frederick Lake Price and Oscar Rejlander are famous for using combination printing.

Starting as early as the mid-19th century, new methods such as the combination printing, began to change the way people looked at different photographic techniques.

Controversy broke out in the photographic community about the use of combination printing. Photographs originally had been regarded as truth and it was perceived that the camera never lied. However, with the newfound ability to manipulate the final product, the notion that photographs depicted "truth" was soon shattered.

Henry Peach Robinson, considered to be another one of the pioneers of combination printing, was not only an artist, but also an author, and wrote many journal articles on photography. He then published a book in 1869 entitled Pictorial Effect in Photography. His writings about technique became fairly well known and he was held in high esteem, despite having critics who accused him of misrepresenting the real world and the truth by using the combination printing method.

In his book, Robinson attempts to add some reasoning to appease the critics, by comparing the photograph editing to other art forms and writing that, "As music is only sound under governance of certain laws, so is pictorial effect only the combination of certain forms and lights and shadows in like manner harmoniously brought together."

He agrees about the argument of staying true to nature in photographs, but alternatively writes that when a photographer obtains a foreground subject, they need the perfect background to create the "harmony" of a good photo, and "if nature does not supply such object, the pictorial requirement may often, without violating material truth, be furnished by art."

In pointing this out, he is saying that it is often necessary to add artistic techniques to photographs.

Discussing the benefits of composition in the art of photography and using combination printing, Robinson wrote, in Pictorial Effect in Photography, that the method of combination served to "produce an agreeable presentation of forms and tones, to tell the story which is to be elucidated, and to embody the spirit of what it is intended the picture shall represent or suggest."

His writings show his knowledge and his passion for creating new content in his photos with using this process.

During the Victorian Era, another proponent of the technique of combination printing was Queen Victoria herself. At the time, artists tried to represent ideal images from natural scenes to portraits. Photographers wished to do the same through creating perfected images after combining them. Queen Victoria was said to have belief in the power that photography could have to visually translate and promote ideals yet still be reality.

== Early examples ==
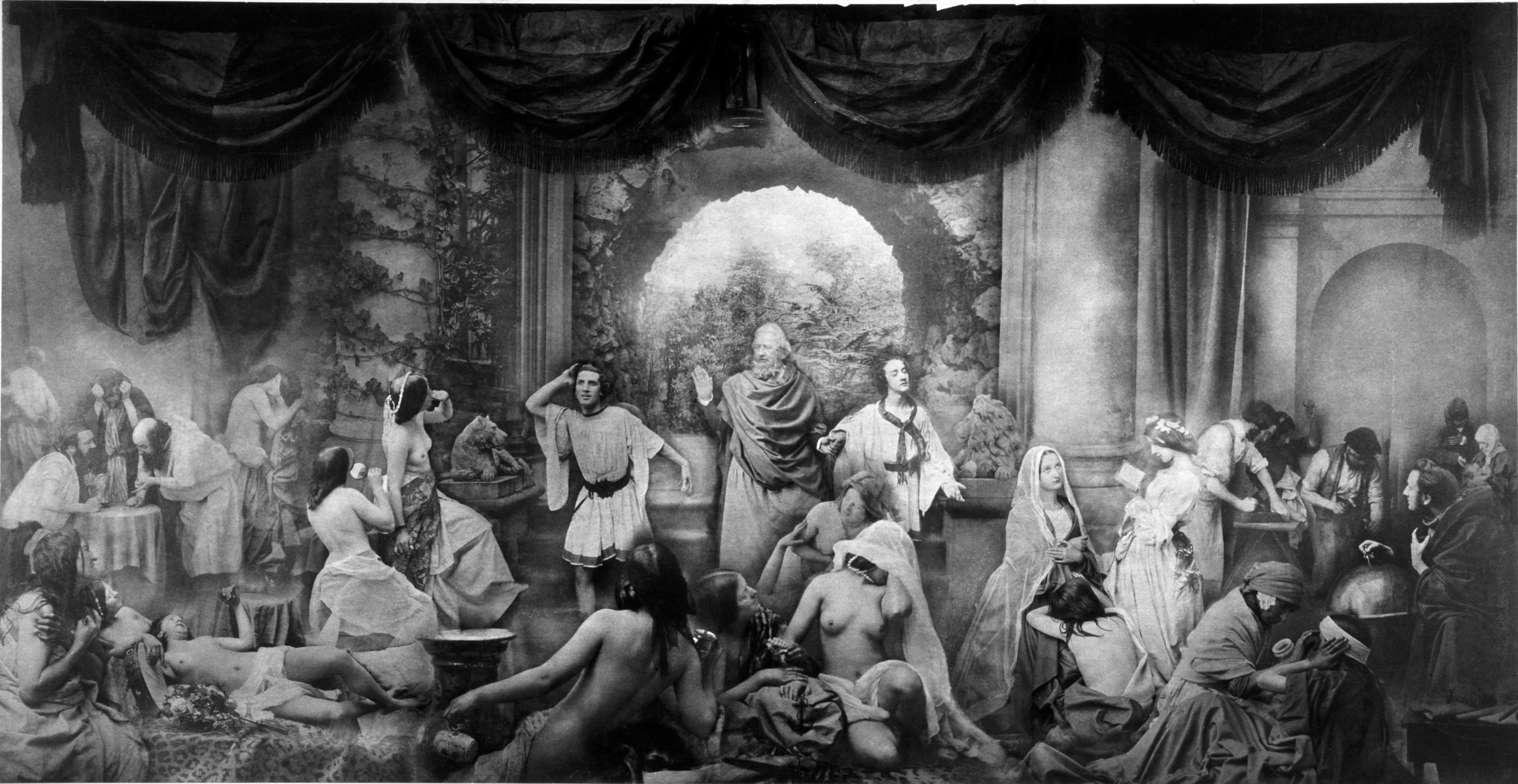
Oscar Gustave Rejlander's Two Ways of Life, 1857

One of the earliest and most famous combination prints is Oscar Rejlander's Two Ways of Life. The print was created in 1857. It was first exhibited at the Manchester Art Treasures Exhibition and it is considered one of the most distinguished examples of the technique. It used a combination of 32 negatives to create the complete image of the final product. The process took about six weeks.

Other examples of the technique can be seen in Henry Peach Robinson's works. In one of his pieces, entitled Autumn there is a darker foreground subject with some hazy distance created with trees visible in the far background. The piece includes several human subjects, some facing the camera with light hitting them, and one darker and facing away from view.

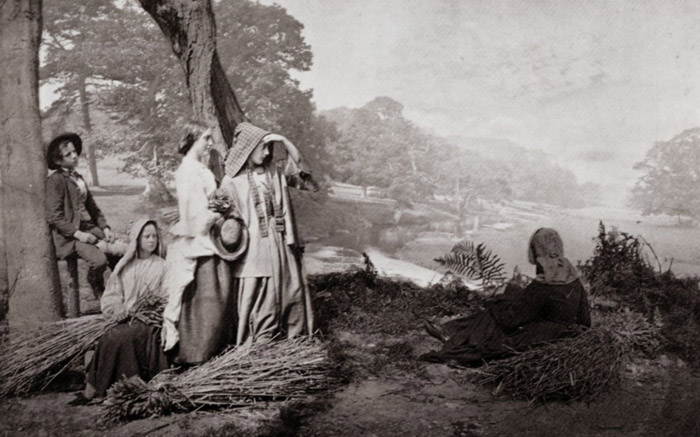
Henry Peach Robinson's Autumn, 1860

This was an albumen print photo that he put together in 1863. When explaining the print, Robinson discussed that he initially sketched out the scene that he hoped to produce, trying different various samples of what he could do with putting the scenery and figures together. Only after he was happy with his sketched out plan would he finally shoot the individual photos and then eventually combine the negatives in printing.

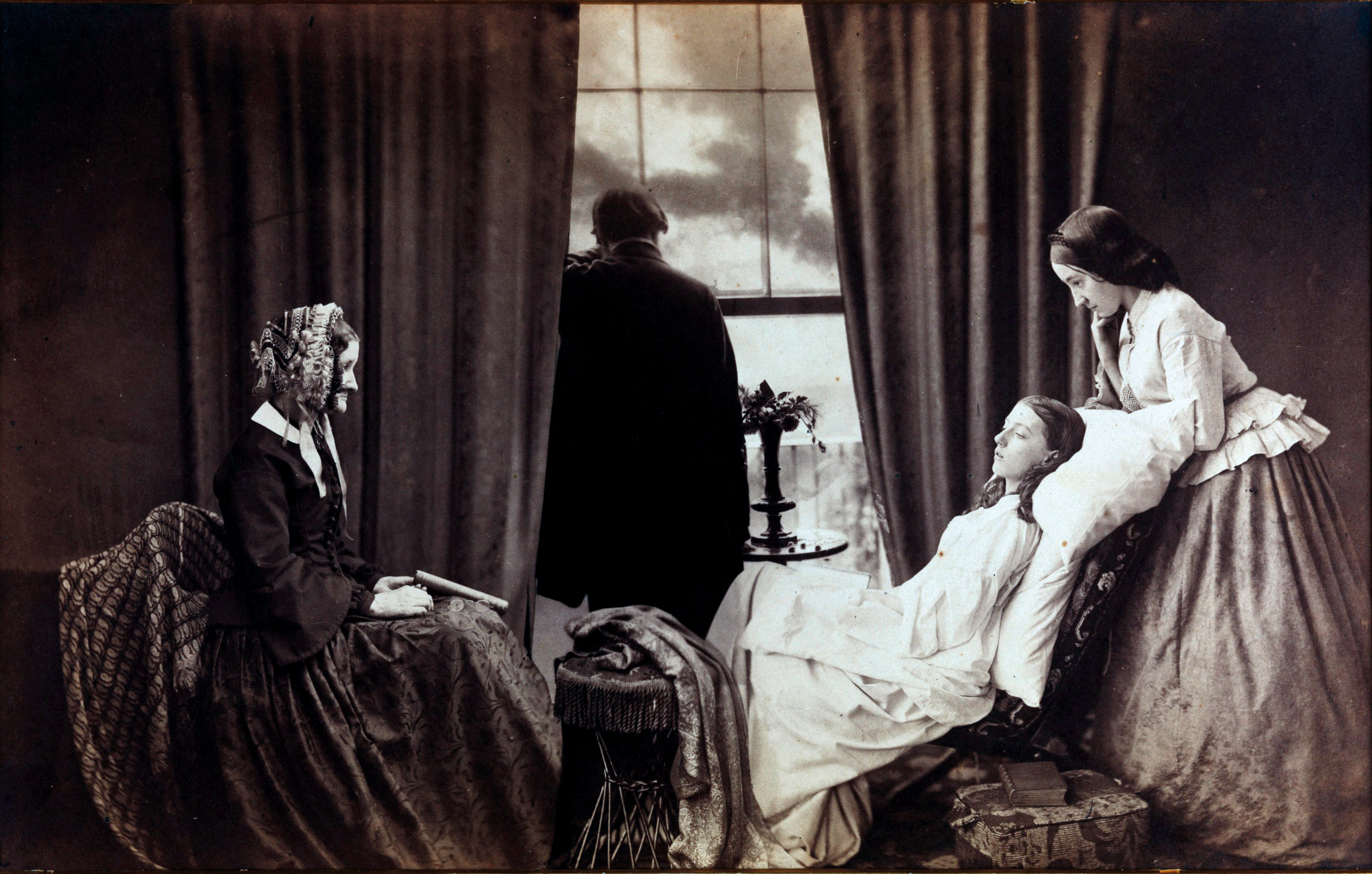
Henry Peach Robinson's Fading Away, 1858

Sometimes called Robinson's "masterpiece," his photograph, Fading Away, was a combination print that he generated in 1858. It took him around five negatives to create the final image. The photo shows a death of a young girl and her grieving family surrounding her. The subject was made up by Robinson and the figures were only posing, but the scene with the girl being centered and bright and the figure turned away, behind in the darkness, created an emotional exhibit.

== Modern applications ==
In more modern times of photography, there exists a theory, presented by Jerry Uelsmann in 1965 to The Society for Photographic Education, called Post-Visualization, that can be connected back to the creation of combination printing.

Post-Visualization was the idea that photographers can rethink what they are creating and manipulate images in the darkroom after photographing their subjects. This allows photographers additional ways to express themselves instead of just following the common belief that photography is a simply mechanical, straightforward process with no creative elements. Combination printing remained a great way of working with changing images to add that creativity.

== See also ==
- Bracketing
- High dynamic range imaging
