= Henry Peach Robinson =

English photographer

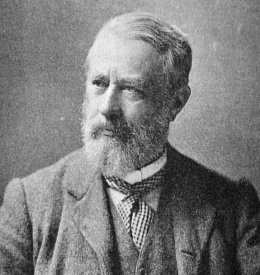
- Born: 9 July 1830; Ludlow Shropshire
- Died: 21 February 1901 (aged 70)
- Resting place: Tunbridge Wells
- Known for: Photography
- Style: Combination Printing

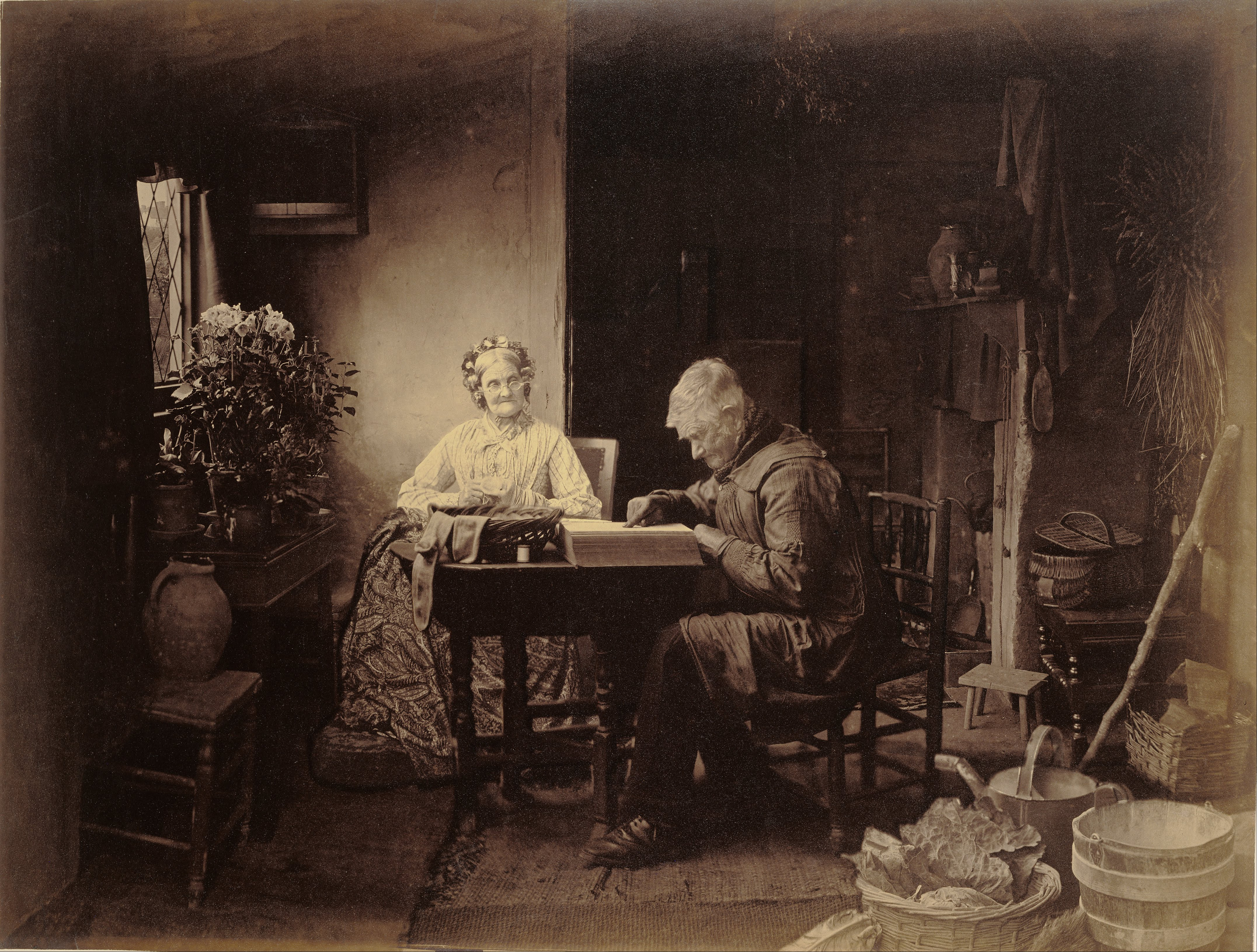
Robinson's When the Day's Work is Done (1877). Combination print made from six different negatives.

Henry Peach Robinson (9 July 1830 – 21 February 1901) was an English pictorialist photographer best known for his pioneering combination printing, an early example of photomontage. He engaged in contemporary debates in the photographic press and associations about the legitimacy of 'art photography' and in particular the combining of separate images into one.

== Life ==
Robinson was born in Ludlow, Shropshire the oldest of four children of John Robinson, a Ludlow schoolmaster, and his wife Eliza. He was educated at Horatio Russell's academy in Ludlow until he was thirteen. He left the academy to take up a year's drawing tuition with Richard Penwarne before being apprenticed to bookseller and printer, Richard Jones.

While continuing to study art, his initial career was in bookselling. In 1850 he worked for Bromsgrove bookseller Benjamin Maund, then in 1851 for the London-based Whittaker & Co. In 1852 he exhibited an oil painting, On the Teme Near Ludlow, at the Royal Academy. This year also marked the beginning of his photographic work. Five years later, following a meeting with the photographer Hugh Welch Diamond, he decided to devote himself to that medium. He opened his first studio in 1855 in Leamington Spa to sell portraits.

In 1856, with Oscar Rejlander, he was a founding member of the Birmingham Photographic Society.

In 1859, he married Selina Grieves, daughter of a Ludlow chemist, John Edward Grieves. His son, Ralph Winwood Robinson, was also a photographer.

In 1864, at the age of 34, Robinson was forced to give up his studio due to ill-health from exposure to toxic photographic chemicals. Photography historian Gernsheim has shown that thereafter Robinson preferred the easier 'scissors and paste-pot' method of making his combination prints, rather than the more exacting darkroom method employed by Rejlander.

Relocating to London, Robinson kept up his involvement with the theoretical side of photography, writing the influential essay Pictorial Effect in Photography (1869) and Being Hints on Composition and Chiaroscuro for Photographers, (1868). Around this time his health had improved sufficiently to open a new studio in Tunbridge Wells with Nelson King Cherrill, and in 1870 he became vice-president of the Royal Photographic Society. He advocated strongly for photography to be regarded as an art form.

The partnership with Cherrill dissolved in 1875. Robinson continued the business until his retirement in 1888 when his son, Ralph Winwood Robinson, took over the studio business. Following internal disputes within the Photographic Society, he resigned in 1891 to become one of the early members of the rival Linked Ring society, in which he was active until 1897, when he was also elected an honorary member of the Royal Photographic Society.

Robinson was an early supporter of the Photographic Convention of the United Kingdom and took part in this institution's long running debates about photography as an art form. He was invited to serve as the President of the PCUK in 1891 but, as he described later, 'I felt compelled to decline, knowing that I could not carry out the duties as they should be carried out, having a defect of voice which would not allow me to read my own address'. He was subsequently persuaded to serve as President in 1896, when his presidential speeches were read out by a colleague.

He died aged 70 and was buried in Royal Tunbridge Wells.

== Works ==
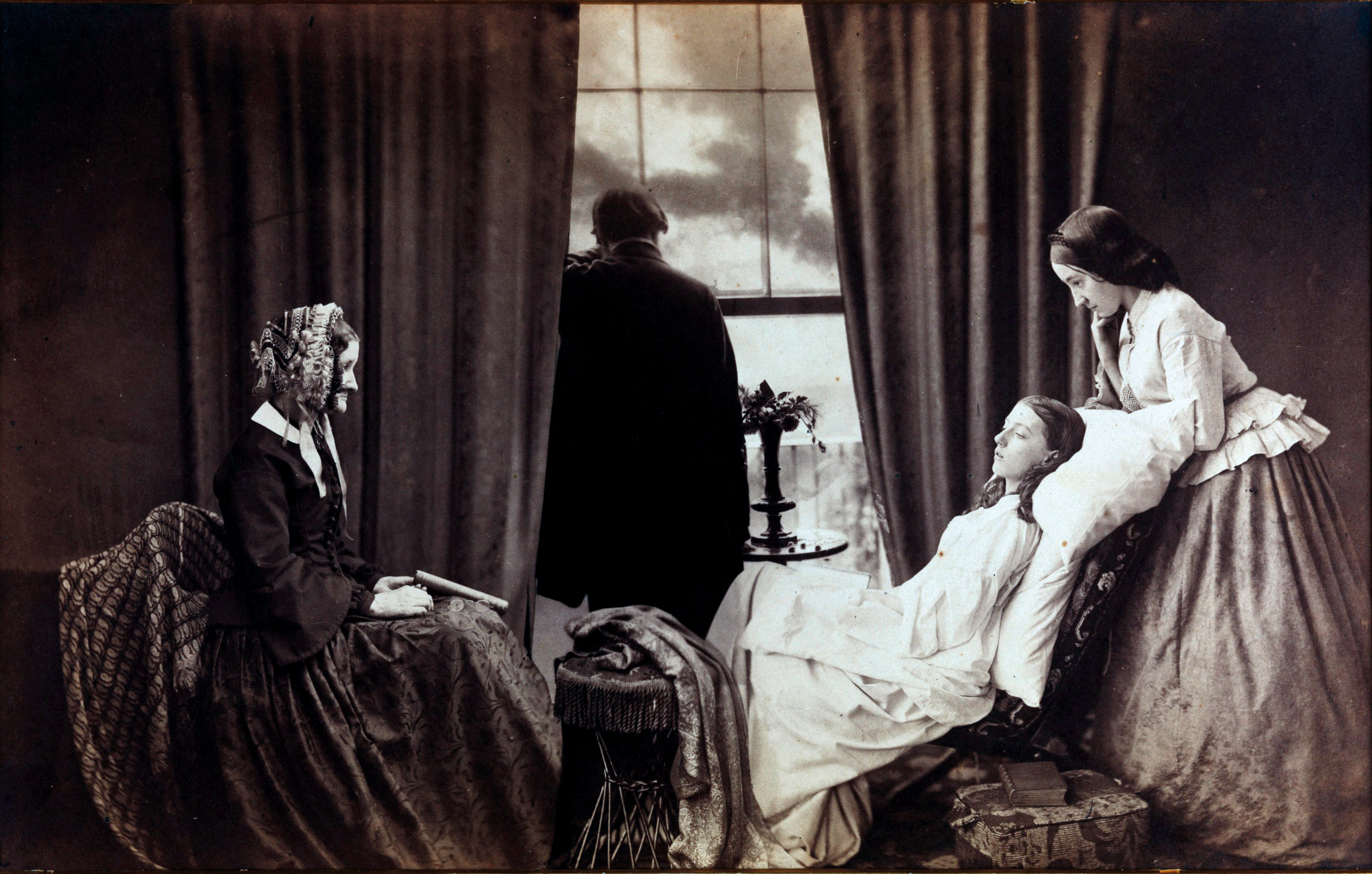
Robinson's Fading Away (1858)

Robinson was one of the most prominent art photographers of his day.

His third and the most famous composite picture, "Fading Away" (1858), was both popular and fashionably morbid. He created it using five photographic negatives. It depicts a young woman dying of tuberculosis, and some reviewers were "scandalized" because they believed the photograph's subject really had been dying.

He was a follower of the pre-Raphaelites and was influenced by the aesthetic views of John Ruskin. In his Pre-Raphaelite phase he attempted to realize moments of timeless significance in a "mediaeval" setting, anticipating the work of Julia Margaret Cameron, Burne-Jones and the Symbolists.

According to his letters, he was influenced by the paintings of J. M. W. Turner. He defended composite photography, asserting that the creation of combination photographs was as demanding of the photographer as paintings were of the artist. Robinson compared the making of Fading Away with Zeuxis' legendary combining of the best features of five young ladies from Crotona to produce his picture of Helena.

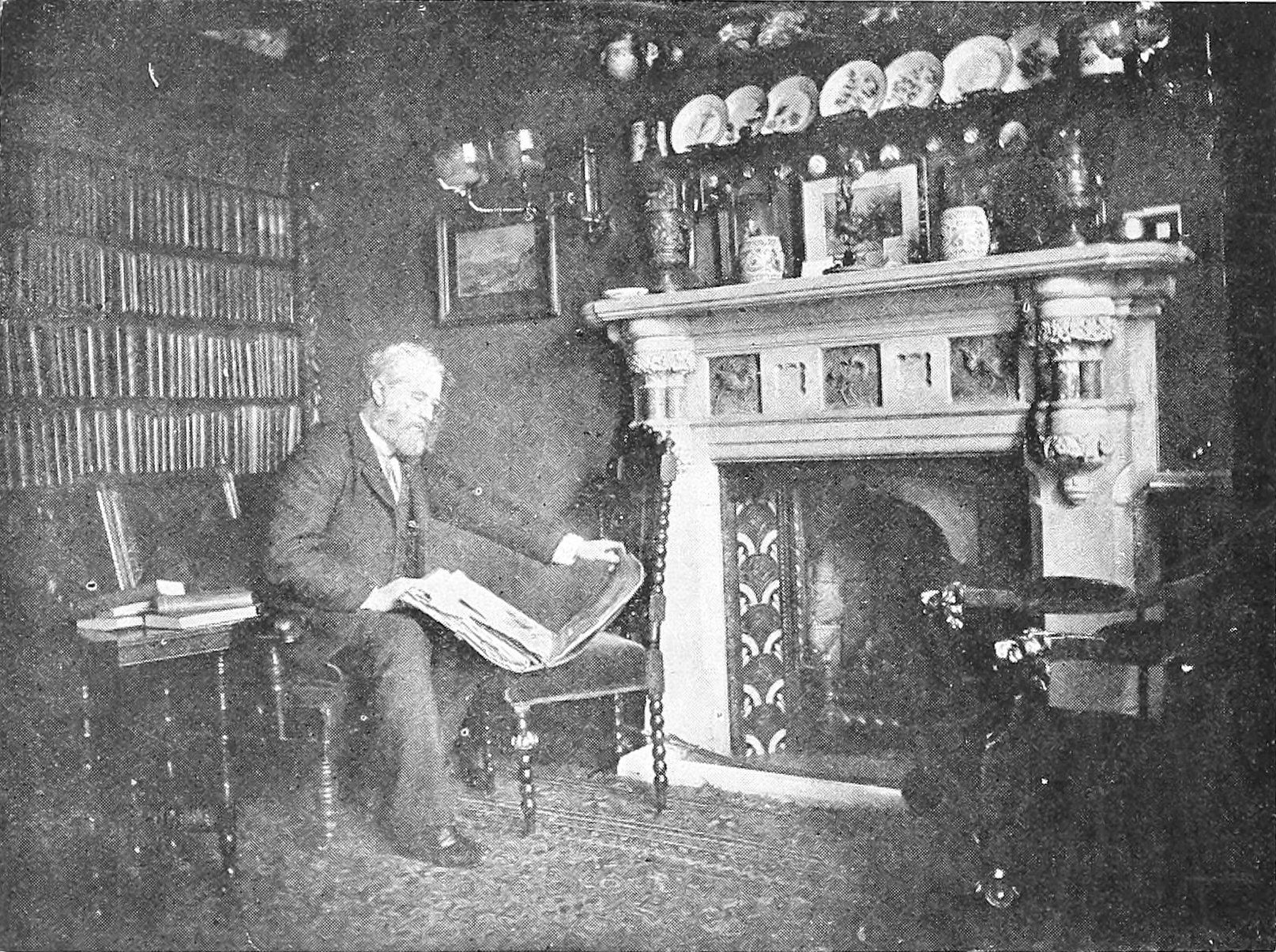
Henry Peach Robinson in his Study at Tunbridge Wells

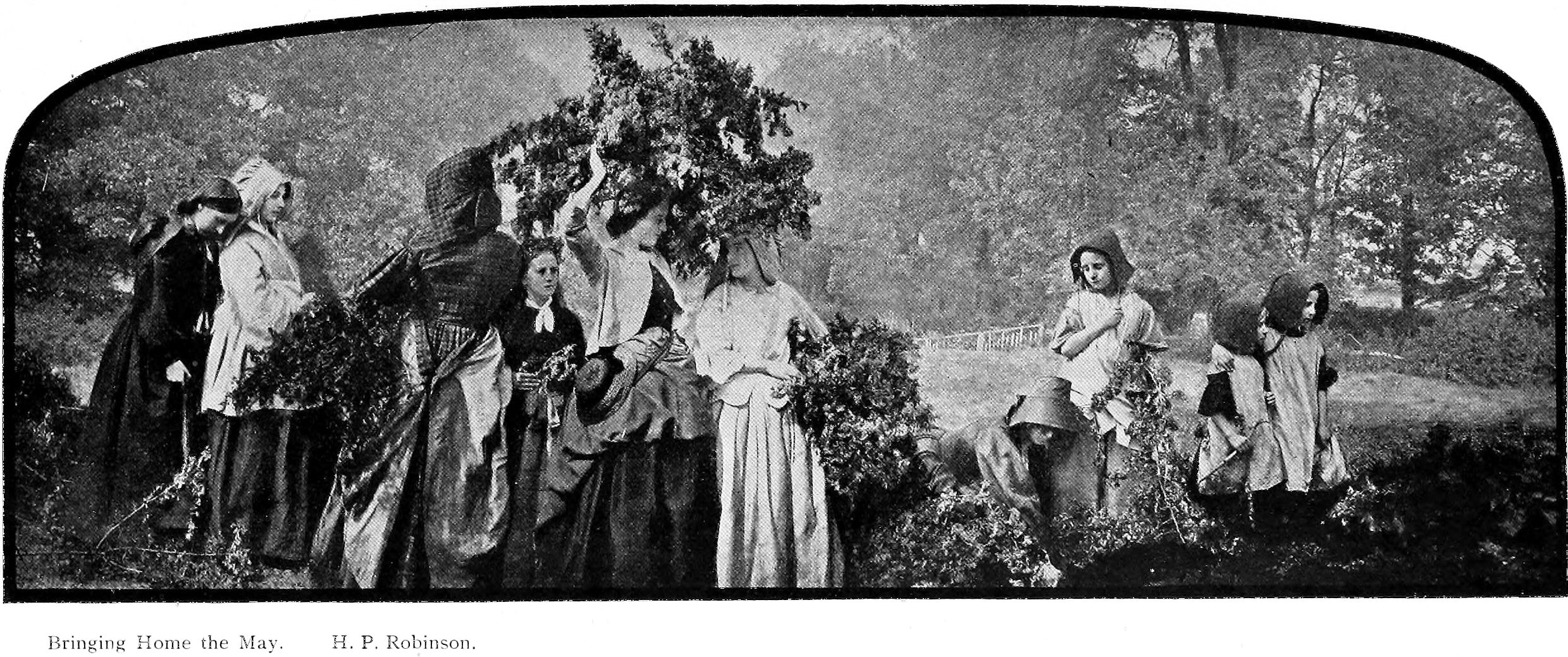
Bringing Home the May, Henry Peach Robinson

== Collections ==
Robinson's work is held in the permanent collections of several institutions, including:

- Johnson Museum of Art
- Clark Art Institute
- Seattle Art Museum
- Saint Louis Art Museum
- George Eastman Museum
- Worcester Art Museum
- SFMOMA
- University of Michigan Museum of Art
- LACMA
- Harvard Art Museums
- Princeton University Art Museum
- Metropolitan Museum of Art
- J. Paul Getty Museum
- National Gallery of Victoria

== Publications ==
Robinson was author of a number of texts in which he promoted the photography as an art form, his books being widely used photographic reference material in the late 19th century.

- Robinson, H.P. Pictorial Effect in Photography: Being Hints On Composition And Chiaroscuro For Photographers. London: Piper & Carter, 1869.
- Robinson, H.P. and William de Wiveleslie Abney. The Art And Practice of Silver Printing. NY: E. & H.T. Anthony & Co., 1881.
- Robinson, H.P. Picture-Making By Photography. London: Hazell, Watson, & Viney, 1889.
- Robinson, H.P. Art photography in short chapters London: Hazell Watson & Viney. 1890.
- Robinson, H.P. Photography as a business. Bradford [Eng.] Percy Lund. 1890.
- Robinson, H.P. The Studio And What To Do in It. London: Piper & Carter, 1891.
- Robinson, H.P. The elements of a pictorial photograph. Bradford : Percy Lund & Co. 1896.
- Robinson, H.P. Catalogue of pictorial photographs. Ralph W. Robinson. Redhill, Surrey. 1901.

== Books about Henry Peach Robinson ==
- Fineman, Mia; Metropolitan Museum of Art (New York, N.Y.); National Gallery of Art (U.S.); Museum of Fine Arts, Houston (2012), Faking it : manipulated photography before Photoshop, Metropolitan Museum of Art; New Haven : Distributed by Yale University Press, ISBN 978-1-58839-473-6
- Handy, Ellen (2004) "Robinson, Henry Peach (1830–1901)", Oxford Dictionary of National Biography, Oxford University Press, 2004 accessed 17 Dec 2007
- Handy, Ellen; Rice, Shelley; Lukacher, Brian (1994), Pictorial effect naturalistic vision : the photographs and theories of Henry Peach Robinson and Peter Henry Emerson, Chrysler Museum, ISBN 978-0-940744-66-0
- Harker, Margaret F. (Margaret Florence) (1988), Henry Peach Robinson : master of photographic art, 1830-1901, B. Blackwell, ISBN 978-0-631-16172-1
- Roberts, Pam; Smith, Lindsay; Lamb, Jenny (2003), Fading Away: Henry Peach Robinson Revisited, Warwick District Council (published 2009), ISBN 978-1-872-940113
- Shiner, L. E. (Larry E.) (September 2001), The invention of art : a cultural history, University of Chicago Press (published 2001), ISBN 978-0-226-75342-3
