= Oscar Gustave Rejlander =

Swedish-British photographer (1813–1875)

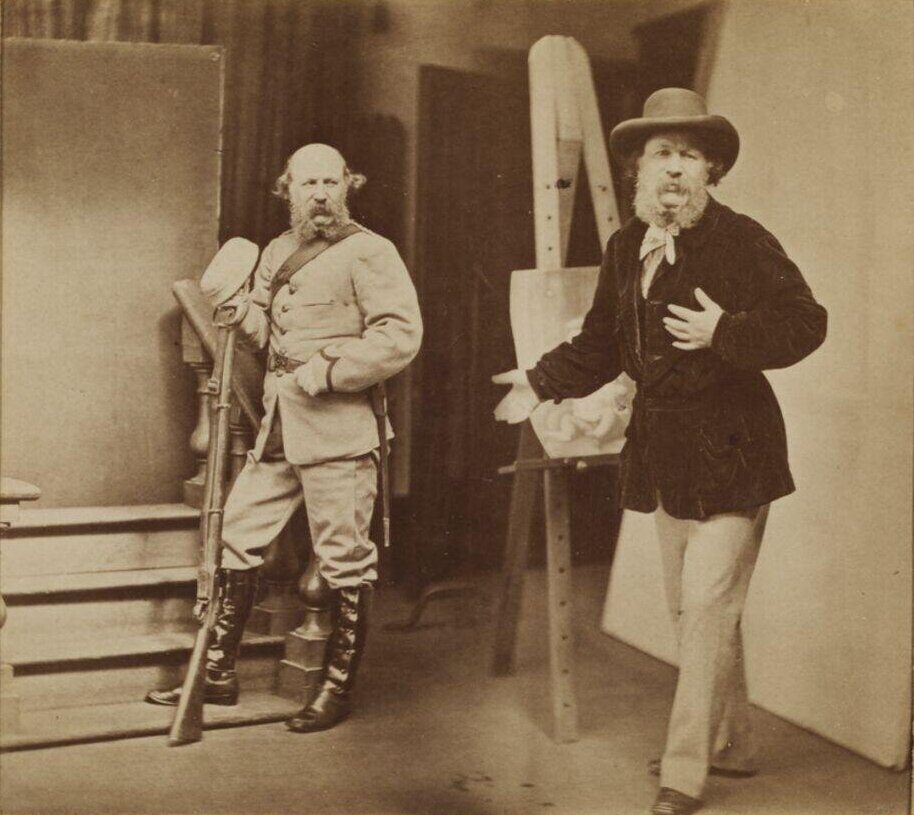
"Double self-portrait" montage of Oscar Rejlander.

Oscar Gustave Rejlander (19 October 1813 – 18 January 1875) was a Victorian art photographer and an expert in photomontage. His collaboration with Charles Darwin on The Expression of the Emotions in Man and Animals has assured him a position in the history of behavioural science and psychiatry.

== Biography ==
According to his naturalisation papers, Rejlander was born in Stockholm on 19 October 1813. He was the son of Carl Gustaf Rejlander, a stonemason and Swedish Army Officer. During his youth, his family moved to the Swedish-speaking community in Rauma, Grand Duchy of Finland (then part of Russia). In the 1830s, he relocated to England, initially settling in Lincoln, England.

He set up as a portraitist in the industrial Midlands town of Wolverhampton, probably around 1846. In the early 1850s, he learned the wet-collodion and waxed-paper processes at great speed with Nicholas Henneman in London. He abandoned his original profession as a painter and portrait miniaturist, apparently after seeing how well a photograph captured the fold of a sleeve, and set up a photography studio. He undertook genre work and portraiture. Rejlander also produced nude studies, mainly for use as studies by painters, and later revealed that his early work was made with the aid of a local troupe of theatrical performers.

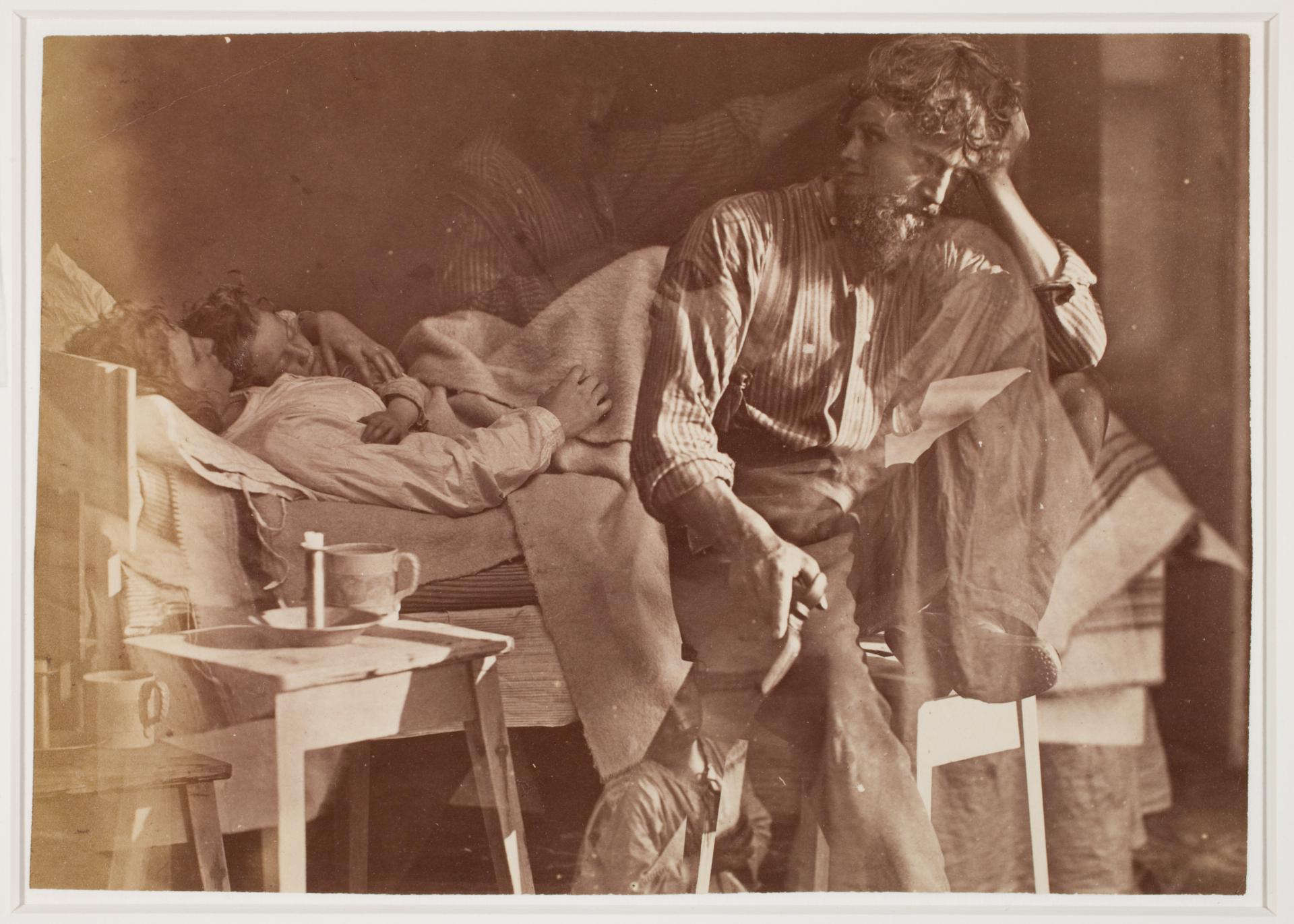
Hard Times, c. 1860.

Rejlander undertook many experiments to perfect his photography, including combination printing, which he did not invent; however, he created more elaborate and convincing composite photographs than any prior photographer. A 15 November 1854 article in the Wolverhampton Chronicle called "Improvement in Calotypes, by Mr. O.G. Rejlander, of Wolverhampton" suggests that by then he was experimenting with combination printing from several negatives. He was a friend of photographer Charles Lutwidge Dodgson (better known by the pen name Lewis Carroll), who collected Rejlander's work and corresponded with him on technical matters. Rejlander later created one of the best-known and most revealing portraits of Dodgson. Like Dodgson, Rejlander's work included many pictures of "undraped" children:

The remarks of his contemporaries bear witness to both his attainments and to the influence which he exercised. Some of his critics were exuberant. Thus, one speaks of his undraped children as being as 'beautiful as those of Della Robbia, Flamingo, and Raphael.' Mr. H. Robinson, the immediate successor to Rejlander, who was also for many years a rival in seeking public applause for genre photography, calls the foregoing 'wonderful pictures of nude children.'

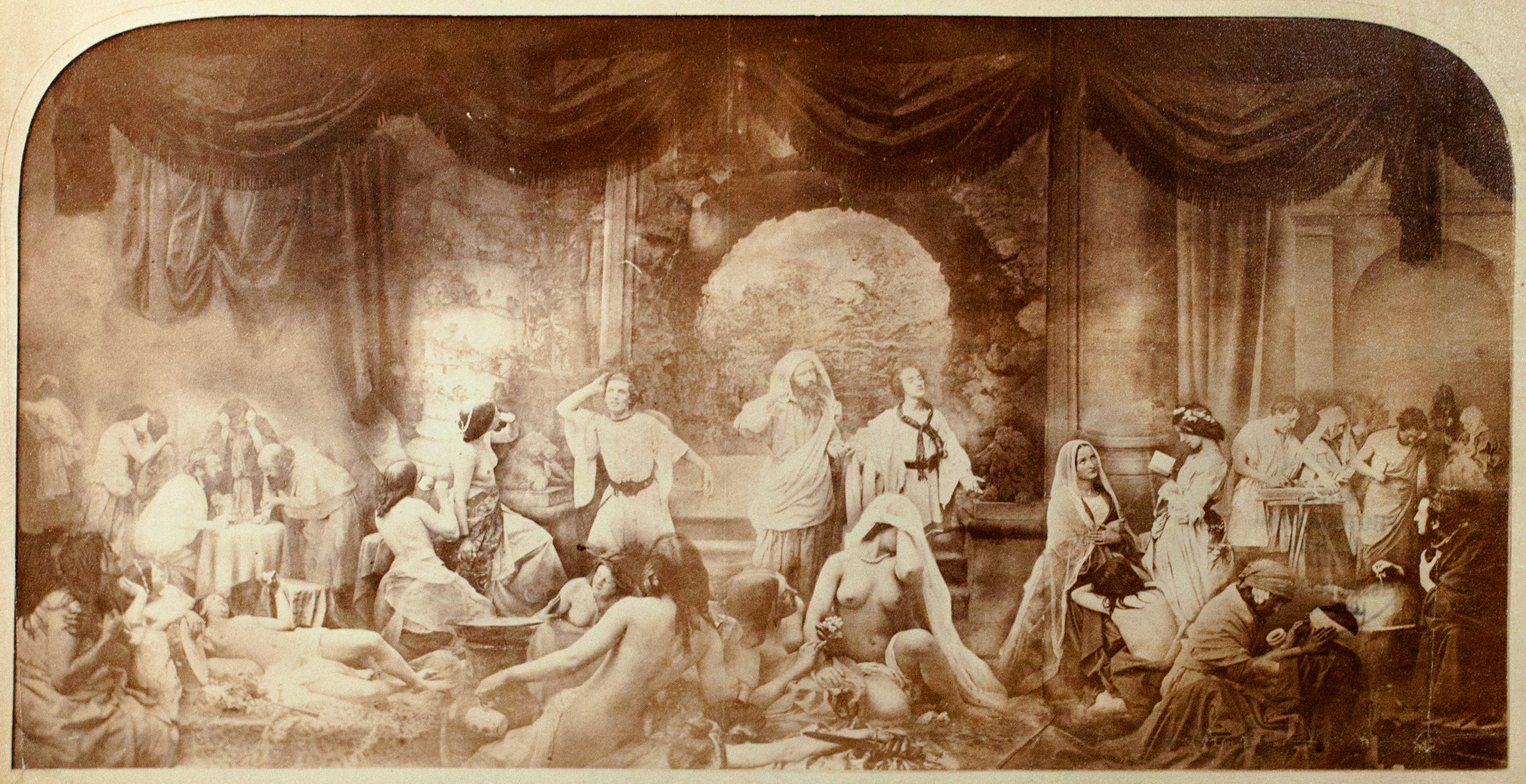
The Two Ways of Life, a moralistic photo montage of Rejlanders own work, 1857.

Rejlander participated in the Paris Exhibition of 1855. In 1856, he made his best-known allegorical work, The Two Ways of Life. This was a seamlessly montaged combination print made of thirty-two images (akin to the use of Photoshop today, but then far more difficult to achieve) in about six weeks. First exhibited at the Manchester Art Treasures Exhibition of 1857, the work shows a man being lured to paths of vice or virtue by good and bad angels. The image's partial nudity, which showed real women as they actually appeared and not the idealised forms then common in Victorian art, was deemed 'indecent' by some. Rejlander was also accused of using prostitutes as models, although Rejlander categorically denied this and no proof was ever offered. Reservations about the work subsided when Queen Victoria ordered a 10-guinea copy to give to Prince Albert. Victoria and Albert would go on to purchase three copies of the work, all of which are now lost.

Despite this royal patronage, controversy about The Two Ways of Life in Scotland in 1858 led to a secession of a large group from the Photographic Society of Scotland, the secessionists founding the Edinburgh Photographic Society in 1861. They objected to the picture being shown with one half of it concealed by drapes. The picture was also shown at the Birmingham Photographic Society with no such furor or censorship. However, the Photographic Society of Scotland later made amends and invited Rejlander to a grand dinner in his honour in 1866, held to open an exhibition that included many of his pictures.

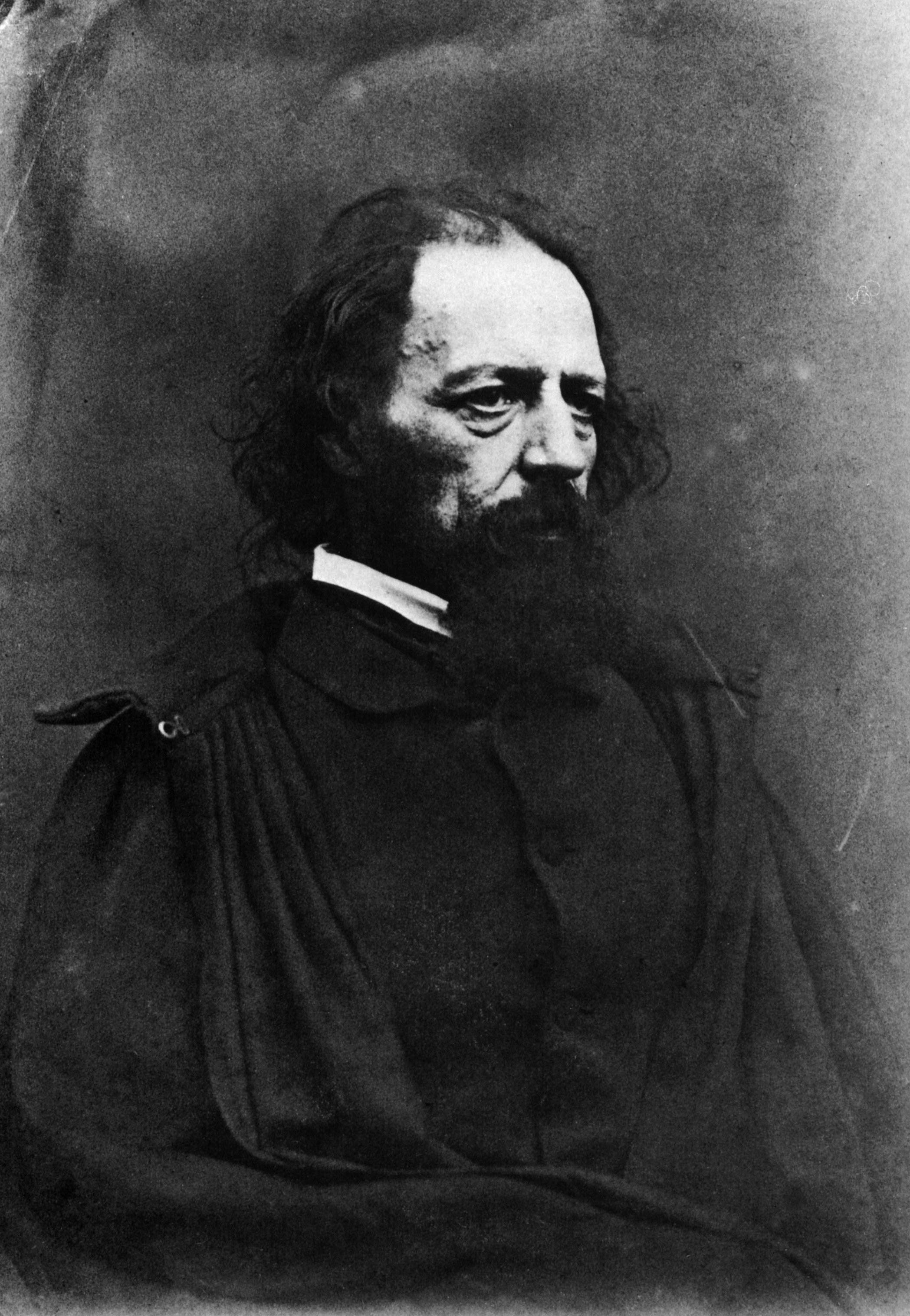
Portrait of Alfred Tennyson, 1st Baron Tennyson, 1862.

Rejlander moved his studio to Malden Road, London, around 1862 and largely abandoned his early experiments with double exposure, photomontage, photographic manipulation and retouching. Instead, he became one of Britain's leading portraitists, creating pictures with psychological charge. He became a leading expert in photographic techniques, lecturing and publishing widely, and sold work through bookshops and art dealers. He also found subject matter in London, photographing homeless London street children to produce popular 'social-protest' pictures such as "Poor Joe", also known as "Homeless".

Charles Lutwidge Dodgson visited Rejlander's Malden Road studio in 1863. Carroll was in the process of relocating his studio and sought Rejlander's advice regarding its design. Around 1863 Rejlander visited the Isle of Wight at the request of Julia Margaret Cameron and helped teach her photography.

Some of Rejlander's images were purchased as drawing-aids by Victorian painters of repute, such as Sir Lawrence Alma-Tadema. In 1871, he contributed photographs to Darwin's classic treatise on The Expression of the Emotions in Man and Animals.

== Personal life ==
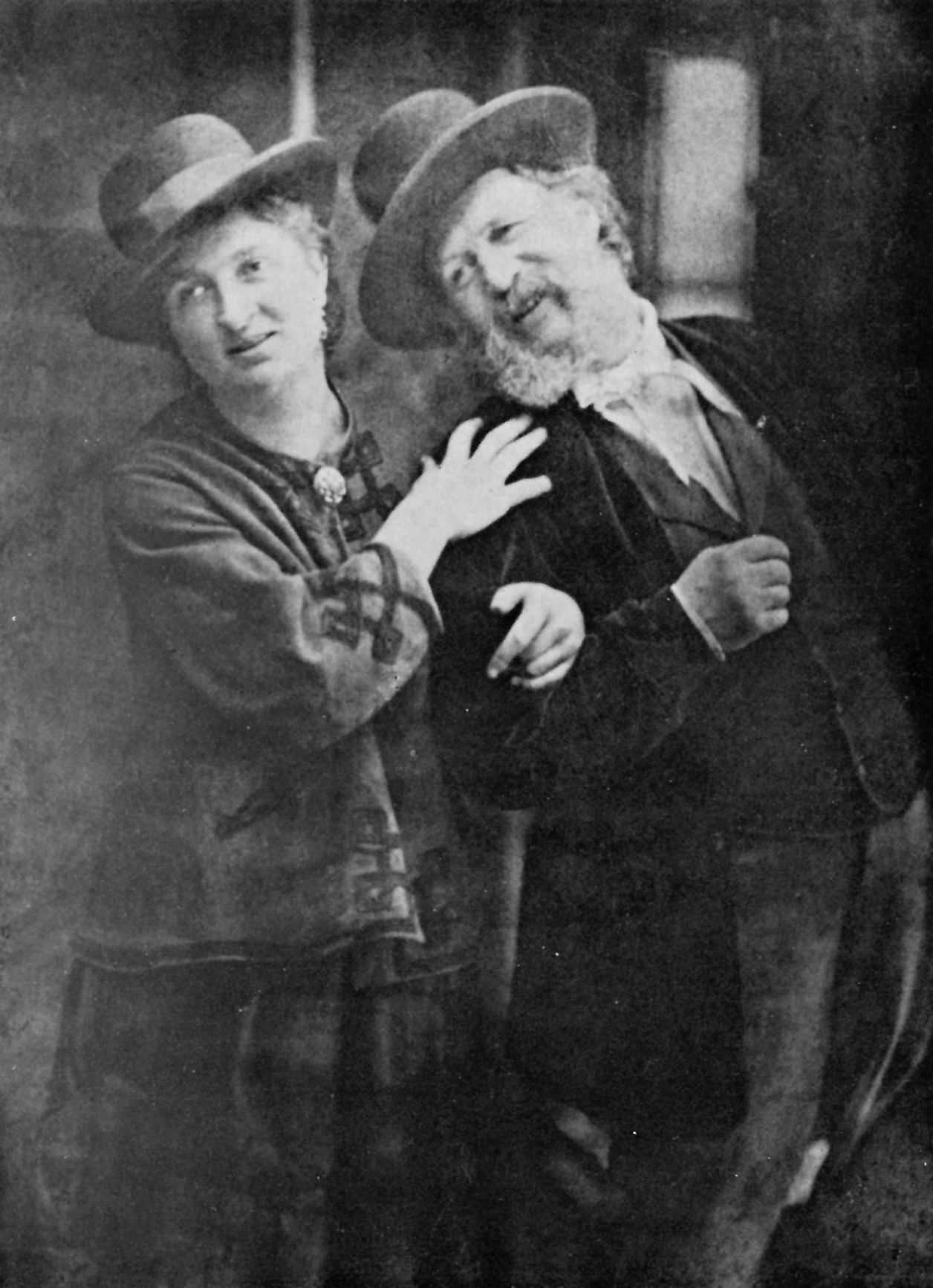
Happy Days, a portrait of Rejlander and Mary Bull, taken by Rejlander, c.1872

In 1862, Rejlander married Mary Bull, who was twenty-four years his junior. She had been his photographic model in Wolverhampton.

Rejlander became seriously ill in 1874 and died in 1875 in Clapham, London, leaving several claims on his estate and costly funeral expenses. The Edinburgh Photographic Society raised money for his widow and helped set up the Rejlander Memorial Fund. His grave is in Kensal Green Cemetery; a new stone was placed there in 2012.

== Collections ==
Rejlander's work is held in the permanent collections of many institutions worldwide, including the San Francisco Museum of Modern Art, the Harvard Art Museums, the Clark Art Institute, the Victoria and Albert Museum, the J. Paul Getty Museum, the University of Michigan Museum of Art, the Princeton University Art Museum, the Museum of Fine Arts St. Petersburg, the Fine Arts Museums of San Francisco, the National Media Museum, Bradford, and the Museum of Fine Arts, Houston.

== See also ==
- Victorian headless portrait, a genre pioneered by Rejlander
