= Jānis Francis =

Latvian general (1887–1956)

- Born: 3 July 1877; Ķoņu parish, Russian Empire
- Died: 24 October 1956 (aged 79); Rīga, Latvian SSR
- Military career
- Allegiance: Russian Empire; Soviet Russia; Latvia
- Branch: Army
- Service years: 1894. – 1918.; 1918. – 1920.; 1921. – 1935.
- Rank: General (1925)
- Wars: Russo-Japanese War; World War I
- Awards: Order of Lāčplēsis (III class), Order of the Three Stars (II, III classes), Latvian Aizsargi Cross of Merit, Order of St. Vladimir (III, IV classes (both with lances)), Order of Saint Stanislaus (II and III classes (both with lances)), Order of St. Anna (III (with lances) and IV class) etc.

Jānis Francis (3 July 1877 – 24 October 1956) was a general of the Latvian Army, recipient of the Order of Lāčplēsis, the 3rd class.

== Biography ==
Born in Ķoņu parish, into a farming family, Francis graduated from a school in Valmiera city. Conscripted into Imperial Russian Army in 1894, he initially served in the 113th infantry regiment, based in Riga. In 1898 graduated from Vilnius military school, as the praporshchik. Afterwards Francis served in the 180th infantry regiment, which was based in Jelgava. He was promoted to the rank of podporuchik in 1899, and to the rank of poruchik in 1903.

In 1904 Francis was attached to the 160th Abkhazian infantry regiment, which participated in Russo-Japanese War. He received several awards for his efforts. After the war he returned to the 180th infantry regiment, where he was put in command of a company. In 1907, he received promotion to the rank of stabskapitän, and in 1914 to the rank of captain.

=== World War I ===
He commanded a company, and later a battalion during World War I. In 1915, he was promoted to the rank of podpolkovnik. He was put in charge of a battalion in the 177th infantry regiment in May 1915. Before joining Latvian riflemen units in 1915 he was several times wounded, receiving concussions twice.

As formation of Latvian riflemen battalions began, Francis went to Riga and was appointed commander of the 2nd Rigas Latvian Riflemen battalion. In July 1916 was promoted to the rank of polkovnik. Participated in battle near Sloka, Ķemeri, Ķekava, defended Nāves island. In 1916 he was critically wounded, receiving concussions twice. In December he fully recovered and was appointed to commander of Latvian riflemen reserve regiment, based in Valmiera. He was proposed as a candidate for the rank major general After October Revolution, in February 1918 he retired from the army and left for Russia.

=== Post-war ===
In September he was mobilized into the Red Army. On 3 February 1921 he joined the Latvian army as a colonel, working in the main headquarters as second assistant to the Chief of Staff. From July he headed a commission aimed at finding and marking main places of battles in which Latvian soldiers took part. Francis was appointed to commander of Riga's garrison in 1922, and was made General in 1925. After becoming commander of main headquarters in 1928, Francis became the second assistant to commander of army headquarters in 1929.

In 1935 he attained the maximum service age and was retired from the army. In 1944 he signed Latvian Central Council memorandum. He died in 1956 in Riga, Latvian SSR and was buried at the 1st Riga Forest Cemetery.
