= Women Shock-workers =

Work of art in the IVAM collection

- Rabotnitsi-udarnitsi, krepite udarniye brigady, ovladevayte tejnikoi, uvelichivayte kadry proletarskij
- Artist: Valentina Kulagina
- Year: 1931
- Location: Institut Valencià d'Art Modern

Women shock-workers is a poster design created by Russian designer, Valentina Kulagina in 1931. It is part of museum collections such as the IVAM in Valencia or the MoMA in New York.

The poster is a lithograph on paper that features a woman with her right arm raised high, the palm of the right hand propelled forward and a copy of Pravda in her left hand. The woman, whose expression depicts ecstasy has clustered below her, a crowd of people.

The poster was an art to advocate for the inclusion of women workers in factories and showed them as skilled workers vital for the Soviet Union's industrial development. In addition, it was a propaganda art in favour of the regime of Joseph Stalin, the first secretary general of the communist party of the Soviet Union.

The poster was created during the role of the designer, Valentina Kulagina, as one of the official designers for the Communist party. It was exemplary of the designer's work during the last point of her professional career.

However, the state farm workers criticized the poster for the lack of communication between the woman and the demonstrators represented below her. It was also faulted for the inclusion of male rather than female tractor drivers and the poster's inability to invite collective farm shock worker women into the party. Aside this, the woman used in the poster was said to resemble a female kulak or a sales clerk and not a shock worker woman.
