= Gustav Klutsis =

Latvian-Russian photographer (1895–1938)

- Born: 4 January 1895; Ķoņi parish, Governorate of Livonia
- Died: 26 February 1938 (aged 43); Moscow, Soviet Union
- Education: Vkhutemas
- Known for: Photomontage
- Notable work: Construction (1921)
- Spouse: Valentina Kulagina

Gustav Gustavovich Klutsis (Latvian: Gustavs Klucis, Russian: Густав Густавович Клуцис; 4 January 1895 – 26 February 1938) was a pioneering Latvian photographer and major member of the Constructivist avant-garde in the early 20th century. He is known for the Soviet revolutionary and Stalinist propaganda he produced with his wife Valentina Kulagina and for the development of photomontage techniques.

Klutsis is one of the comparatively small number of Soviet poster artists to have died in the Great Terror of 1937–38.

== Biography ==
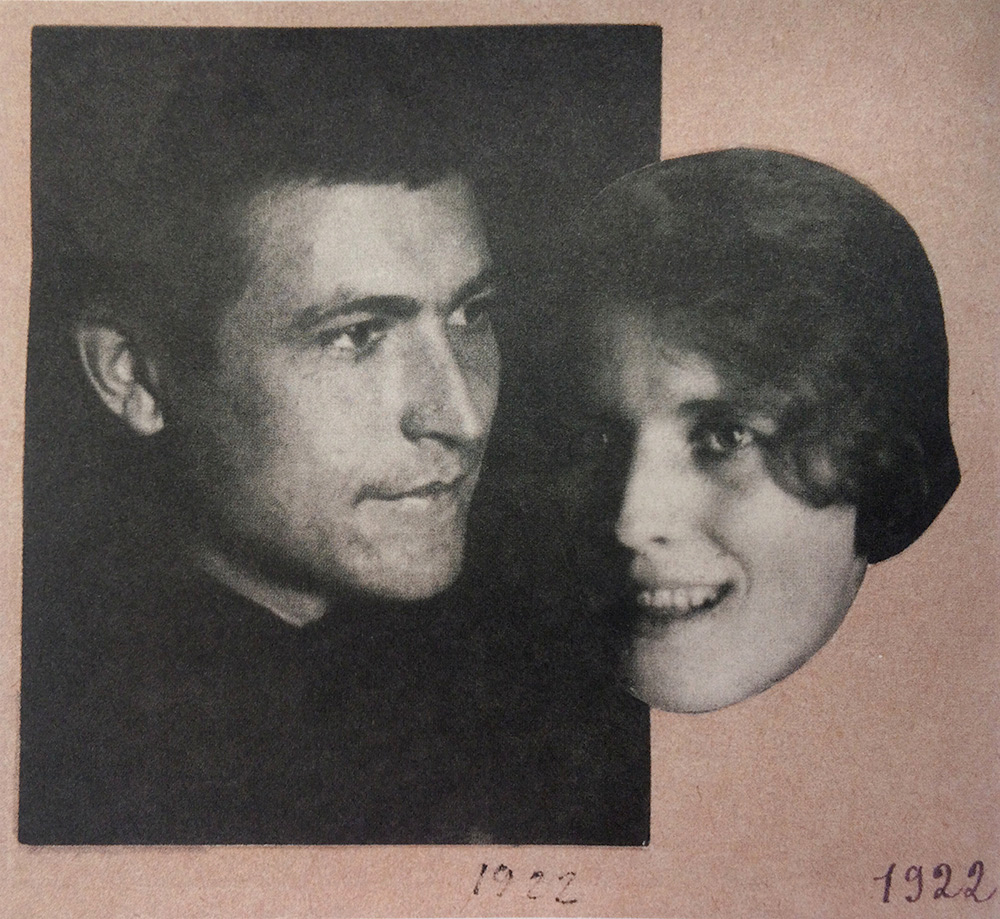
Klutsis and Kulagina in 1922, photomontage by Klutsis

Born in Ķoņi parish, near Rūjiena, Klutsis began his artistic training in Riga in 1912. In 1915 he was drafted into the Russian Army, serving in a Latvian riflemen detachment, then went to Moscow in 1917. As a soldier of the 9th Latvian Riflemen Regiment, Klutsis served among Vladimir Lenin's personal guard in the Smolny in 1917–1918 and was later transferred to Moscow to serve as part of the guard of the Kremlin (1919–1924).

In 1918–1921 he began art studies under Kazimir Malevich and Antoine Pevsner, joined the Communist Party, met and married longtime collaborator Valentina Kulagina, and graduated from the state-run art school VKhUTEMAS. He would continue to be associated with VKhUTEMAS as a professor of color theory from 1924 until the school closed in 1930.

Klutsis taught, wrote, and produced political art for the Soviet state for the rest of his life. As the political background degraded through the 1920s and 1930s, Klutsis and Kulagina came under increasing pressure to limit their subject matter and techniques. Once joyful, revolutionary and utopian, by 1935 their art was devoted to furthering Joseph Stalin's cult of personality.

Despite his active and loyal service to the party, Klutsis was arrested in Moscow on 16 January 1938, as a part of the so-called "Latvian Operation" as he prepared to leave for the New York World's Fair. Kulagina agonized for months, then years, over his disappearance. His sentence was passed by the NKVD Commission and the USSR Prosecutor’s Office on 11 February 1938, and he was executed on 26 February 1938, at the Butovo NKVD training ground near Moscow. He was rehabilitated on 25 August 1956 for lack of corpus delicti.

== Work ==
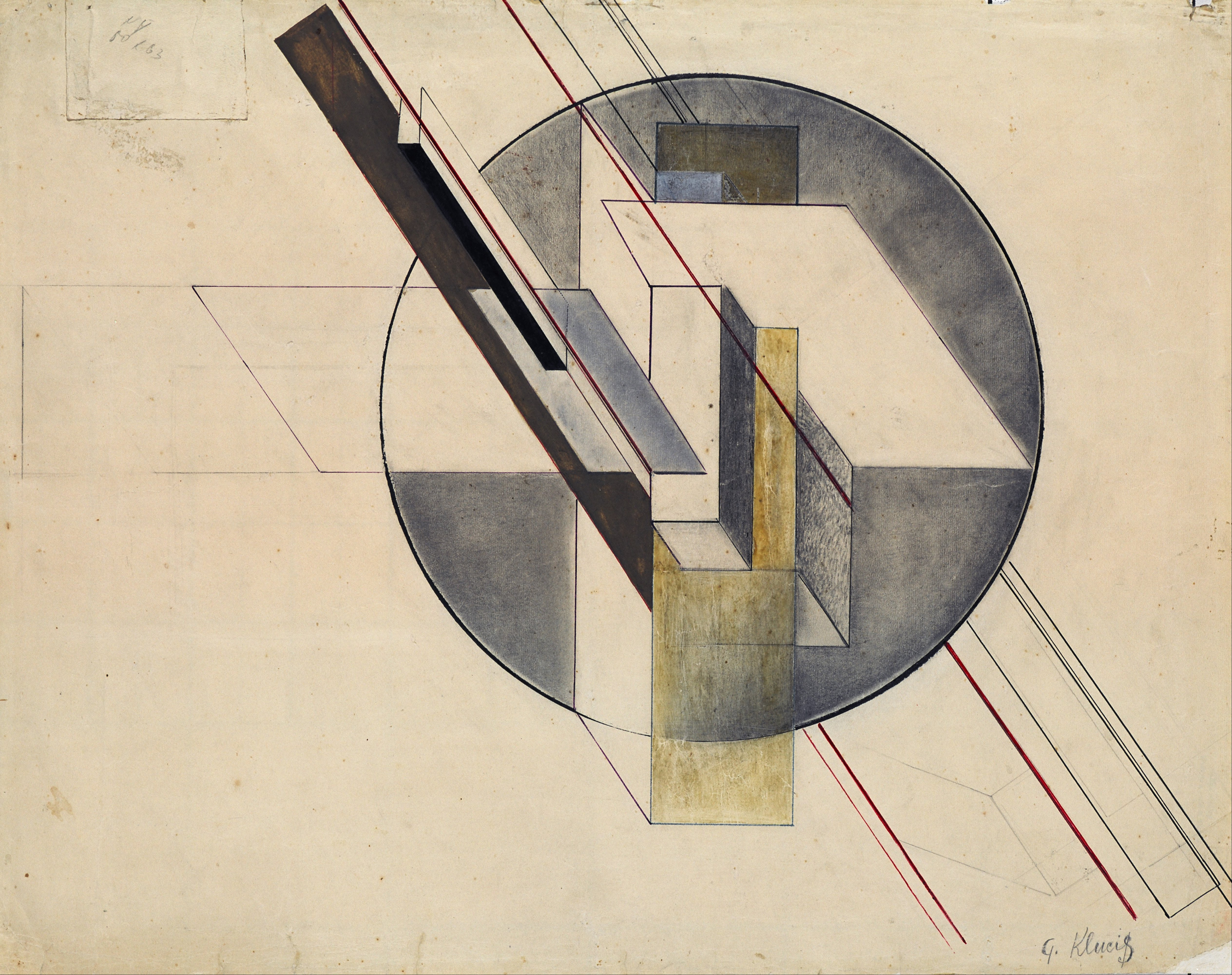
Construction, 1921. Latvian National Museum of Art

Klutsis worked in a variety of experimental media. He liked to use propaganda as a sign or revolutionary background image. His first project of note, in 1922, was a series of semi-portable multimedia agitprop kiosks to be installed on the streets of Moscow, integrating "radio-orators", film screens, and newsprint displays, all to celebrate the fifth anniversary of the Revolution. Like other Constructivists he worked in sculpture, produced exhibition installations, illustrations and ephemera.

But Klutsis and Kulagina are primarily known for their photomontages. Some of their popular posters include "Electrification of the whole country" (1920), "There can be no revolutionary movement without a revolutionary theory" (1927), and "Field shock workers into the fight for the socialist reconstruction" (1932). For economy they often posed for, and inserted themselves into, these images, disguised as shock workers or peasants.

Klutsis is one of four artists with a claim to having invented the subgenre of political photo montage in 1918 (along with the German Dadaists Hannah Höch and Raoul Hausmann, and the Russian El Lissitzky). He worked alongside Lissitzky on the Pressa International exhibition in Cologne.
