= Andrejs Auzāns =

Latvian general and topographer (1871–1953)

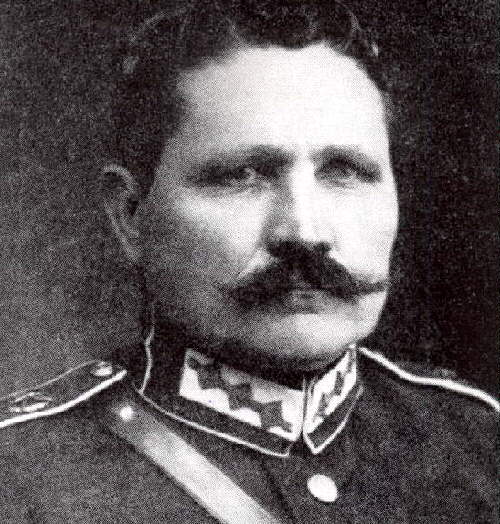
- Born: April 4, 1871; Pļaviņu parish, Russian Empire (Now Klintaine parish Latvia)
- Died: March 23, 1953 (aged 81); Stockport, United Kingdom
- Military career
- Allegiance: Russian Empire; Soviet Russia; Latvia
- Branch: Army
- Rank: General
- Conflicts: Russo Japanese War; World War I Russian Civil War
- Awards: Order of St. Stanislaus II and III degree Order of Anna II and III degree Order of St. George IV degree Order of three stars Order of St. Vladimir IV and II degree Order of the Three Stars
- Other work: lecturer, publisher

Andrejs Auzāns (1871–1953) was a Latvian general and topographer.

Auzāns was a major general in the Imperial Russian Army, best known for being the commander of the 7th Bauska Rifleman Regiment and the 2nd Rifleman Brigade. He also served as the chief of the Russian General Staff Topographical Section for the Red Army.

== Early life ==
Andrejs Auzāns was born on April 4, 1872, in Pļaviņu parish, in the Bormaņi homestead. He studied in a parish school in Koknese and Vietalva. In 1893, he graduated from a school in the city of Pskov, Russia as a land surveyor.

== Life until the First World War ==
After graduating from school, Auzāns enlisted in a military topography school from which he graduated in 1895. He later served as podporuchik (lieutenant) in Finland. Starting in 1896, he was an officer at a topography unit near St. Petersburg.

In 1900, he began his studies in the Russian Academy of General Staff and graduated in 1903 as a captain. In 1905, he graduated from a practical course in geodesy and astronomy at the Pulkovo observatory and was admitted into the Russian General Staff. He participated in the Russo-Japanese War. Later, he served as an officer and topographer in Estonia, Finland, Manchuria and Turkmenistan. In 1907 he was promoted to the rank of podpolkovnik (lieutenant colonel). From 1907 until 1910 he worked as an astronomer. In 1911, he was promoted to the rank of colonel. From 1911 until 1916 he was a director of the Tashkent observatory.

== First World War ==
When Latvian riflemen units formed in 1915, Auzāns was in Uzbekistan. He returned to Latvia in 1916 and enlisted in a rifleman unit; ultimately becoming the commander of the 7th Bauska Rifleman Regiment. Before the legendary Christmas Battles, Auzāns was appointed as the commander of the 2nd Latvian Rifleman Brigade. In 1917 he was promoted to the rank of major-general and appointed chief of the Russian General Staff Topographical Section. He served in this post until 1920, after the October Revolution. In 1921, he worked as a lecturer in the Soviet Military Academy.

== Life in the Republic of Latvia ==
Auzāns returned to Latvia in 1923 and enlisted in the Latvian Army. He was promoted to the rank of general and became a member of the Military Council at the Ministry of War. In 1927, he became the chief of the topographical section of the Latvian Army Headquarters. Auzāns also worked as a lecturer in the Latvian Military Academy, and was the chief of a Latvian rifleman association. In 1933, he reached the maximum service age and retired. In later years, he published several books about topography and military history.

== Last years ==
During and after the occupation of Latvia in 1940 Auzāns was not repressed. He did not collaborate with either the Soviet or Nazi powers. In the autumn of 1944, Auzāns migrated to Germany with his family. In 1948 he settled in Great Britain. Andrejs Auzāns died on March 23, 1953, in Stockport, Great Britain. He was buried in a local cemetery.
