= Reinholds Bērziņš =

Latvian military officer

- Born: 16 July [O.S. 4 July] 1888; Königshof, Wolmar County, Governorate of Livonia, Russian Empire
- Died: 19 March 1938 (aged 49); Kommunarka shooting ground, Moscow Oblast, RSFSR, Soviet Union

Reinholds Bērziņš (Russian: Ре́йнгольд Ио́сифович Бе́рзин, romanized: Reingold Iosifovich Berzin) (16 July 1888 - 19 March 1938) was a Latvian teacher, and later a rifleman and Soviet military leader. He was executed during the Great Purge and rehabilitated during the Khruschev Thaw.

== Early years ==
Berzin was born on 16 July 1888 at Ķoņi Parish, Governorate of Livonia, Russian Empire (today – in Latvia, near the border with Estonia) in a family of farmworkers for-hire. His level of education is uncertain, but it is known that initially he worked as a herder and later as a factory worker. In 1905 Berziņš joined the Social Democracy of the Latvian Territory. Beginning in 1909 he worked as a teacher. In 1911 Bērziņš was arrested for distributing Bolshevik literature and spent over a year in prison.

== World War I and Civil War ==
In 1914 Bērziņš was drafted into the army, and in 1916 he graduated from ensign school. As a poruchik Bērziņš participated on frontlines of World War I where he continued to disseminate Bolshevik propaganda. In 1917 he was elected as an executive officer of the 40th Army Corps, a member of the 2nd Army military revolutionary committee, and was a delegate of the 2nd All-Russian Congress of Soviets.

At the end of 1917 Bērziņš commanded the Latvian detachment during the capture of the Headquarters of the Supreme Commander in Mogilev. After that he led a detachment that participated in the Ukrainian-Soviet War and the defeat of the rebellion of the Polish corps under the command of Polish General Józef Dowbor-Muśnicki. In June 1918 Bērziņš was placed in charge of the Northern Ural-Siberian Front which later was transformed into the 3rd Army of Workers-Peasant Red Army (RKKA) that fought the revolt of the Czechoslovak Legion.

From December 1918 to June 1919, Bērzinš worked as an inspector of the army of the Latvian Soviet Republic, and from 1919 to 1920 he was a member of the Revolutionary Military Councils of the Western (August - December 1919), Southern (December 1919 - January 1920), Southwestern (January - September 1920) and the Turkestan (from September 1920 - to November 1921 and from December 1923 to September 1924) fronts, and from July 1924 the Western Military District.

== Post-war activities ==
In 1924 Bērziņš worked for the Western Military District. In 1924 he retired from the army and in 1927-37 worked for the military industry and the People's Commissariat of Land Cultivation of the Russian SFSR.

== Purge and rehabilitation ==
On December 10, 1937, Bērziņš, working at that time as the manager of the Agrotekhznaniye trust of the People's Commissariat of Agriculture of the RSFSR, was arrested. On March 19, 1938, he was shot, after having been found guilty by the Military Collegium of the Supreme Court of the USSR at the Kommunarka firing range (Moscow Region).

He was rehabilitated in August 1955.
