= 4th Vidzeme Latvian Riflemen Regiment =

Regiment of the Latvian Riflemen (1916–1918)

- 4. Vidzemes latviešu strēlnieku pulks
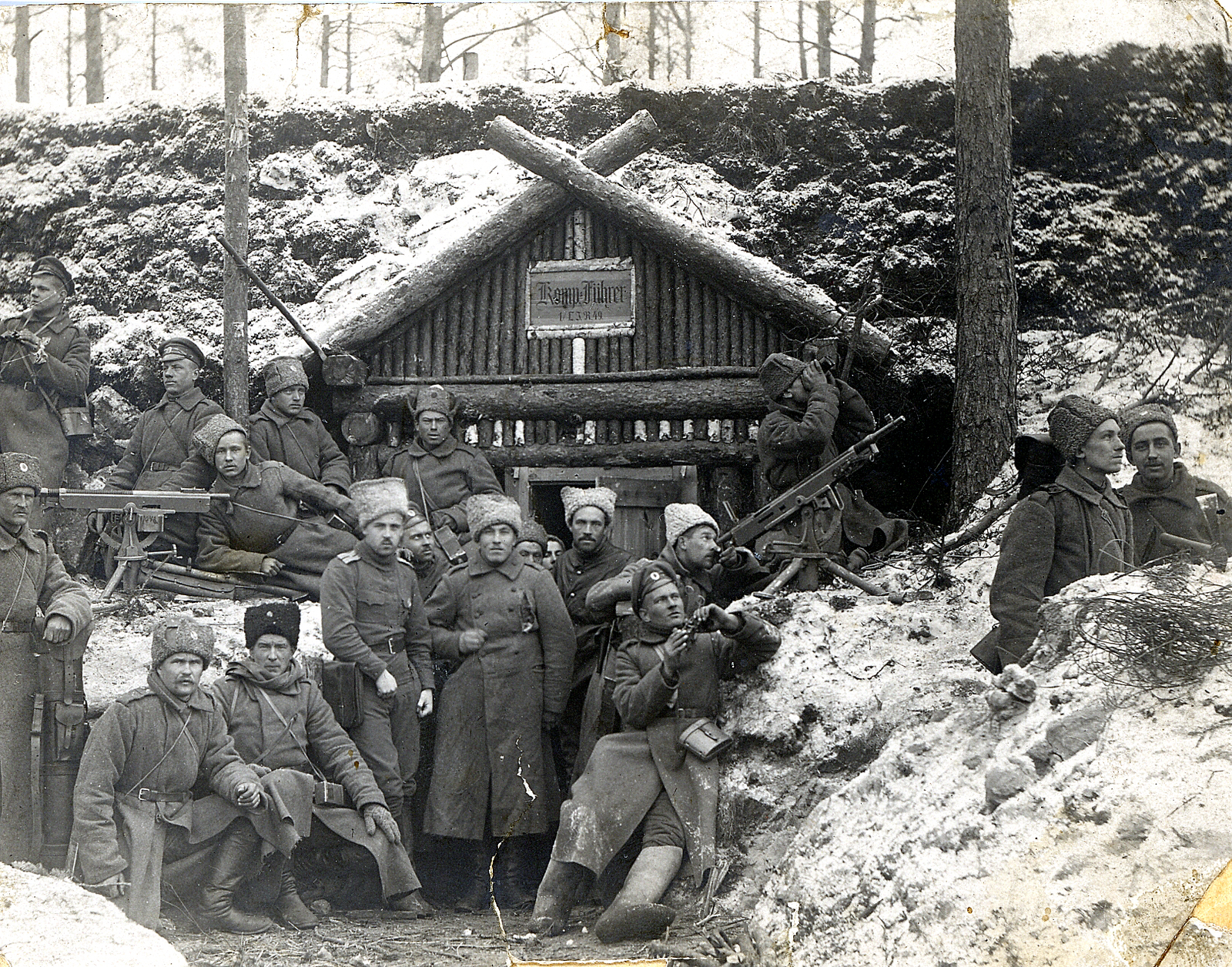
- Active: 1916–1918
- Country: Russian Empire; Russian Republic (from 1917)
- Branch: Imperial Russian Army; Russian Army (from 1917)
- Size: Eight companies
- Engagements: World War I; Christmas Battles; Battle of Jugla

The 4th Vidzeme Latvian Rifle Regiment (Latvian: 4. Vidzemes latviešu strēlnieku pulks) was an infantry rifle military unit of the Imperial Russian Army. The regiment was an armed formation of the Latvian Riflemen as part of the 1st Latvian Rifle Brigade. The regiment was formed from the 4th Vidzeme Latvian Rifle Battalion on 3 November 1916. On 30 December 1917, the regiment was included in the Latvian Rifle Corps. On 6 April 1918, the regiment was demobilized according to terms of the Treaty of Brest-Litovsk.

== Creation of the battalion ==
The 4th Vidzeme Latvian Rifle Battalion was originally conceived as an additional battalion for the volunteer defenders of Riga in September 1915, recruited on 2 February 1916. It was formed from Latvians who had previously been drafted into other parts of the Russian army. The battalion's banner depicted a rising sun with a sword and an oak branch above it. Initially, each battalion composed of four companies and five teams: scouts, machine gunners, mounted demolitions, signalmen, and logistics. The battalion consisted of 26 officers, seven doctors and civil servants, 1246 soldiers and non-commissioned officers. It possessed 164 horses, four machine guns and 47 carts. Each battalion formed its own military band. In the summer of 1916, two more companies were created in the battalion.

== Formation of the regiment ==
In preparation for the Christmas Battles on 3 November 1916, the battalion was transformed into a regiment and integrated into the 1st Latvian Rifle Brigade. The regiment had eight companies and eight teams: machine gunners, sappers, mounted reconnaissance, infantry reconnaissance, communications, police, weapons accounting and trench guns. The staff composed of: 50 officers, seven doctors and office workers, 1,497 soldiers and non-commissioned officers. It also had 290 horses and 104 carts.

== Commanders ==
- Lieutenant colonel Eduards Pēteris Pauls (12 October 1915 – 18 March 1916)
- Colonel Ansis Zeltiņš (18 March 1916 – 27 January 1917)
- Colonel Rūdolfs Bangerskis (27 January – 11 February 1917)
- Colonel Anton Petrovich Zeltin (from 11 February 1917)

== Participation ==
- From February to September 1916, the 4th Vidzeme Latvian Rifle Battalion took part in positional battles in the swamps between Smarde and Kemeri.
- During the Christmas Battles, 30 officers, 1,129 riflemen, 148 grenadiers and 233 non-commissioned officers and soldiers in auxiliary teams took part in the 4th Vidzeme Latvian Rifle Regiment. The regiment lost 12 officers, 884 riflemen and non-commissioned officers killed, wounded and missing.

=== Battle of Kemeri in 1916 ===
Battle on 16 February on the Kemeri - Tukums road: two killed and two wounded. Battle of Smard 14 February: four missing. March 10 battle near Klapkalnciems and Ragaciems: no casualties. Battle of 15 April: 5 dead. 1 September battle near Kemeri: four killed, 25 wounded. September 8–9 battle near Smarda and Kemeri: 15 killed, 52 wounded.

=== Christmas battles in the Tirel swamp in 1917 ===
January 5 to 6: battle in the Tirel swamp: 177 fell, 525 wounded, 218 missing. January 11–13 battle in the Tirel swamp: no data.

=== Battle of Riga in 1917 ===
September 2 battle near the village of Grēnes near Olaine without losses.

== Dissolution ==
On 30 December 1917, after the October Revolution, the 4th Vidzeme Latvian Rifle Regiment was integrated in the newly formed Latvian Rifle Corps, commanded by Colonel Jukums Vācietis. The corps consisted of two divisions, commanded by Gustav Mangulis and Peter Aven. According to the terms of the Treaty of Brest-Litvosk, on 6 April 1918, the Soviet government of Russia issued a demobilization order of the Latvian Rifle Regiment and create the Latvian Rifle Division within the Red Army.

== Decorated soldiers ==
- Rudolfs Bangerskis: captain of the 1st Daugavgriva Latvian Rifle Regiment, later lieutenant colonel, regiment commander (25.8.1915-18.11.1916), later colonel of the 4th Vidzeme Latvian Rifle Regiment, later chief of staff of the Latvian Rifle Brigade. January 17, 1917 in the battle of Lozmeteikalns [Machine Gun Hill; Ložmetējkalns] personally carried out reconnaissance and found out the position of the front, led the regiment in bayonet combat under direct and fierce fire and recaptured lost positions. Awarded the Arms of St. George (1917) and the Military Order of Lacplesis, 3rd class (1923).
- Leopold Berkold, lieutenant of the 4th Vidzeme Latvian Rifle Regiment. On 12 January 1917, with a reserve company, he went on the offensive near Machine Gun Hill, stopped the Germans and secured the position of the right wing of the Latvian riflemen. In this battle he was seriously wounded. Awarded the Military Order of Lacplesis, 3rd class (1924).
- Roberts Žanis Briesma-Briesme, lieutenant of the 4th Vidzeme Latvian Rifle Regiment from April 11, 1916. On December 23, 1916, after the breakthrough of the German front near Mangali, he attacked the Skangali fortifications with his company and, under enemy fire, occupied 3 dugouts in a bayonet battle. Awarded the Order of St. Vladimir, 4th class (8 November 1917) and the Cross of St. George, 4th class.
- Aleksandrs Mežciems, doctor-captain of the 4th Vidzeme Latvian Rifle Regiment. During the Christmas battles on 12 January 1917, the dressing station was moved from 3 miles to 400 steps from the front edge of the battle line, and seeing that many wounded remained on the battlefield, he headed under fire with several orderlies and escorted many soldiers to the first aid station were saved. He was awarded for military merits the orders of St. Stanislav 2nd and 3rd classes, St. Anna 2nd and 3rd classes, the St. George Cross of the 4th Class, 3 St. George medals. In June 1919, he joined the Separate Student Company and was appointed assistant to the senior doctor of the Liepaja Infirmary. In 1920 he was promoted to lieutenant colonel and appointed senior physician. In 1924, for this feat he was awarded the Military Order of Lāčplēsis, 3rd Class.
- Ansis Zeltiņš, colonel, commander of the 4th Vidzeme Latvian Rifle Regiment. On 23 December 1916, during the Christmas battles, he and his regiment occupied German fortified dugouts in a stubborn struggle. On 12 January 1917, he again occupied the fortified trenches on Machine Gun Hill and held them under incessant enemy fire until the evening. He was awarded several orders of St. Anna and St. Vladimir, and for his services in the Christmas battles - the Arms of St. George. Also awarded the St. George Cross, 4th Class with a laurel branch.

Alfrēds Linde was born on 7 September 1891 in Jēkabpils, he graduated from the Department of Justice of the University of Latvia, and took part in the War of Independence. He had lieutenant colonel rank and he was the judge of court martial, Head of the Board of Court Martial, and assistant to the court martial Chief Prosecutor. He was awarded the Order of the Three Stars.
