= Photomontage =

Composite image created from two or more photographs

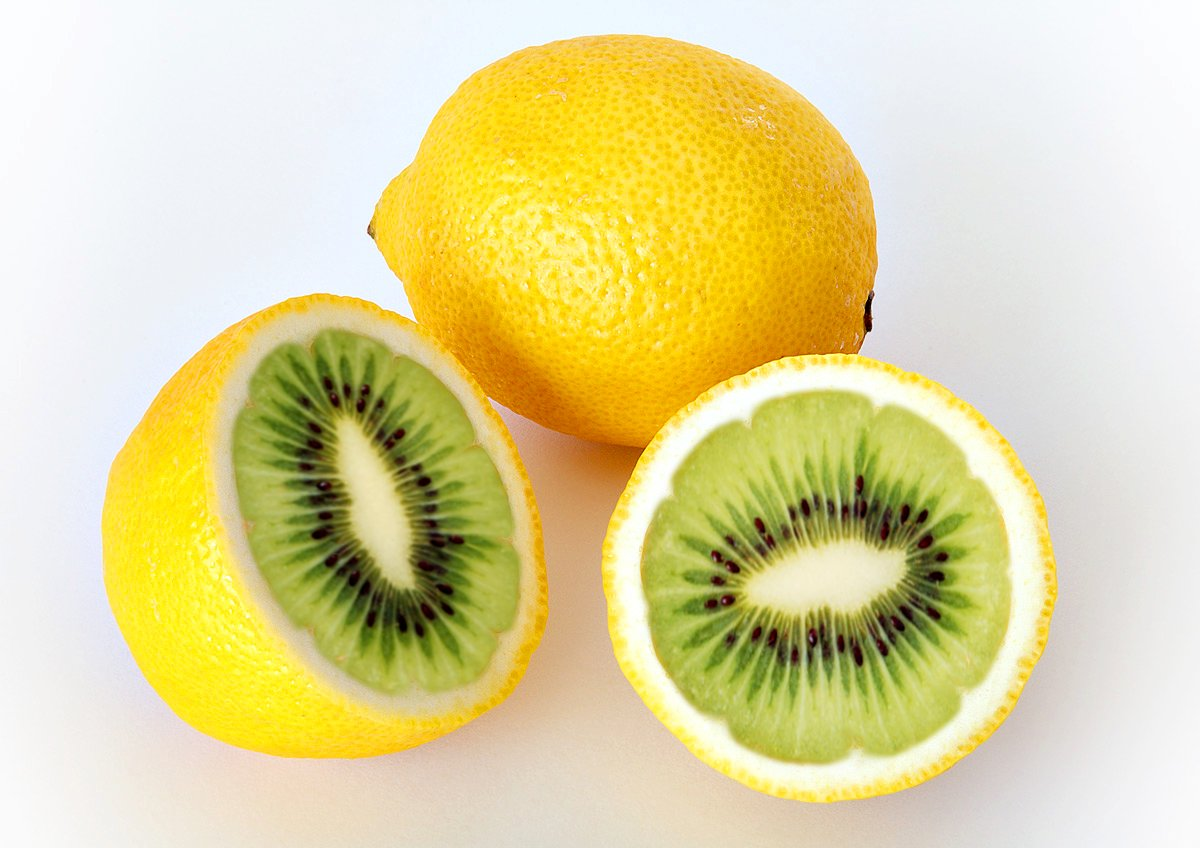
Photomontage of kiwifruit and lemons, digitally manipulated using GIMP

Photomontage is the process and the result of making a composite photograph by cutting, gluing, rearranging and overlapping two or more photographs into a new image. Sometimes the resulting composite image is photographed so that the final image may appear as a seamless physical print. A similar method, although one that does not use film, is realized today through image-editing software. This latter technique is referred to by professionals as "compositing", and in casual usage is often called "photoshopping" (from the name of the popular software system). A composite of related photographs to extend a view of a single scene or subject would not be labeled as a montage, but instead a stitched image or a digital image mosaic.

== History ==
Author Oliver Grau in his book, Virtual Art: From Illusion to Immersion, notes that the creation of an artificial immersive virtual reality, arising as a result of technical exploitation of new inventions, is a long-standing human practice throughout the ages. Such environments as dioramas were made of composited images.

=== 19th century ===
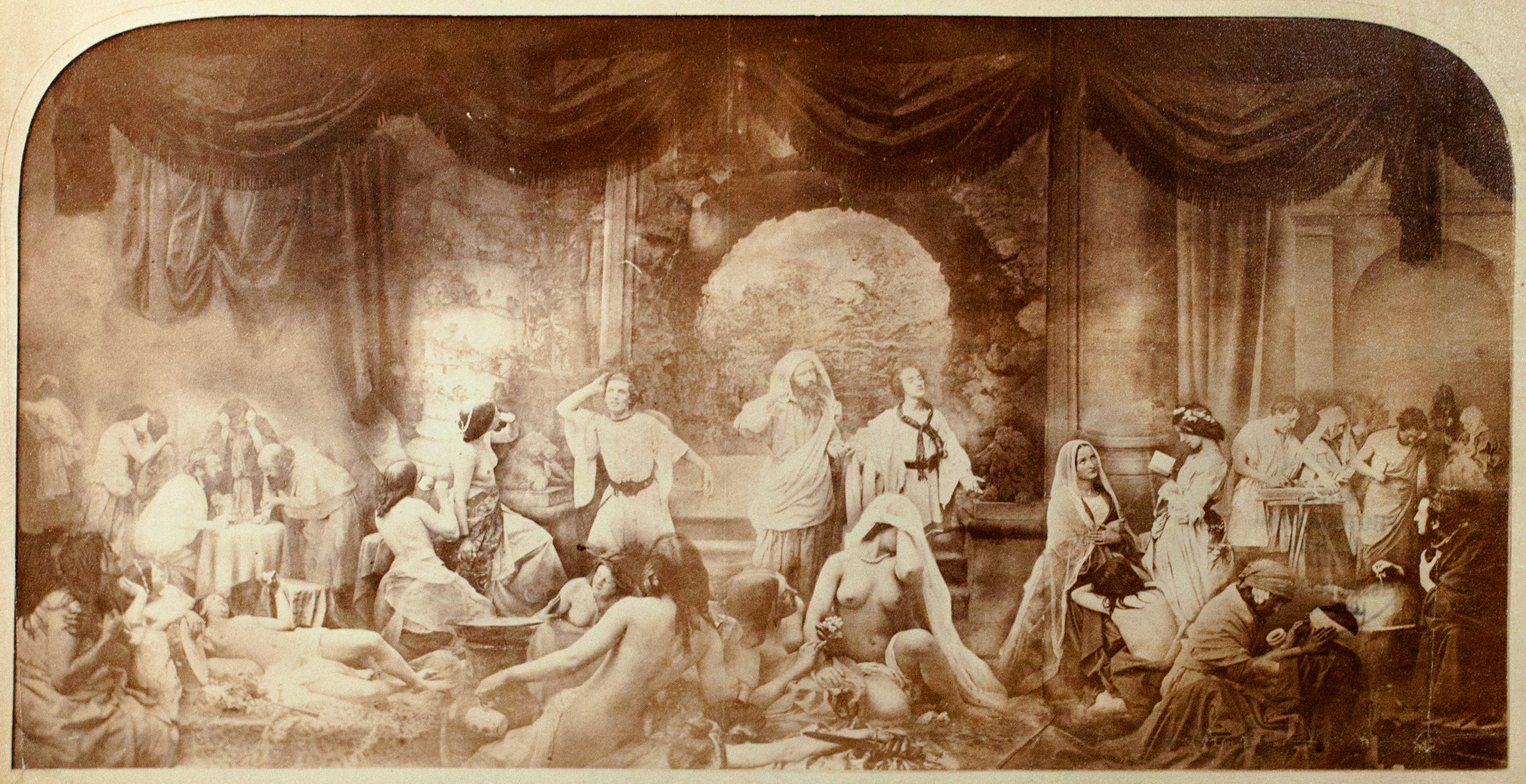
The Two Ways of Life, a moralistic photo montage of Rejlanders own work, 1857-a choice between vice (at left) and virtue (at right)

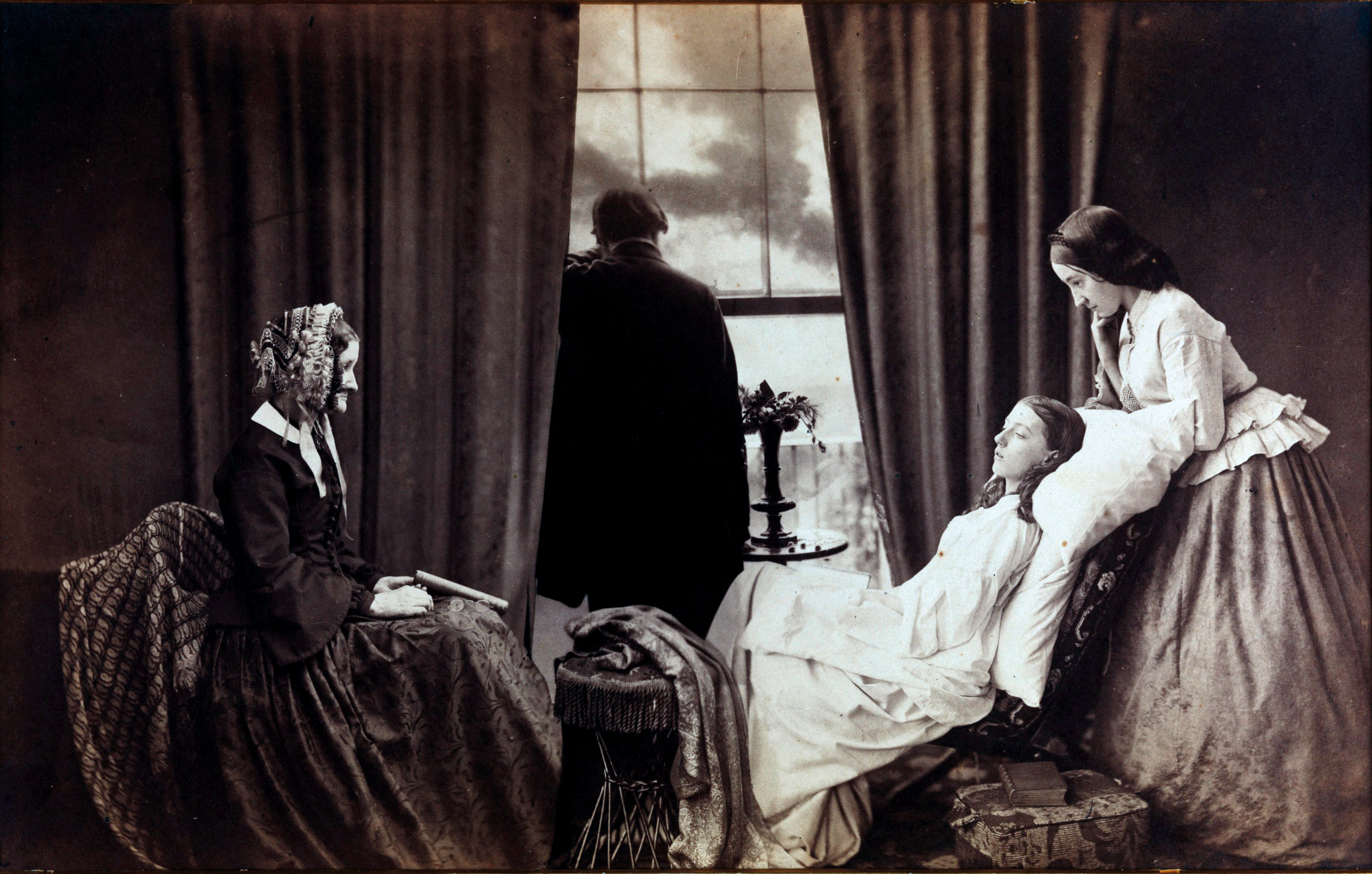
Robinson's Fading Away (1858)

The first and most famous mid-Victorian photomontage (then called combination printing) was "The Two Ways of Life" (1857) by Oscar Rejlander, followed shortly thereafter by the images of photographer Henry Peach Robinson such as "Fading Away" (1858). These works actively set out to challenge the then-dominant painting and theatrical tableau vivants.

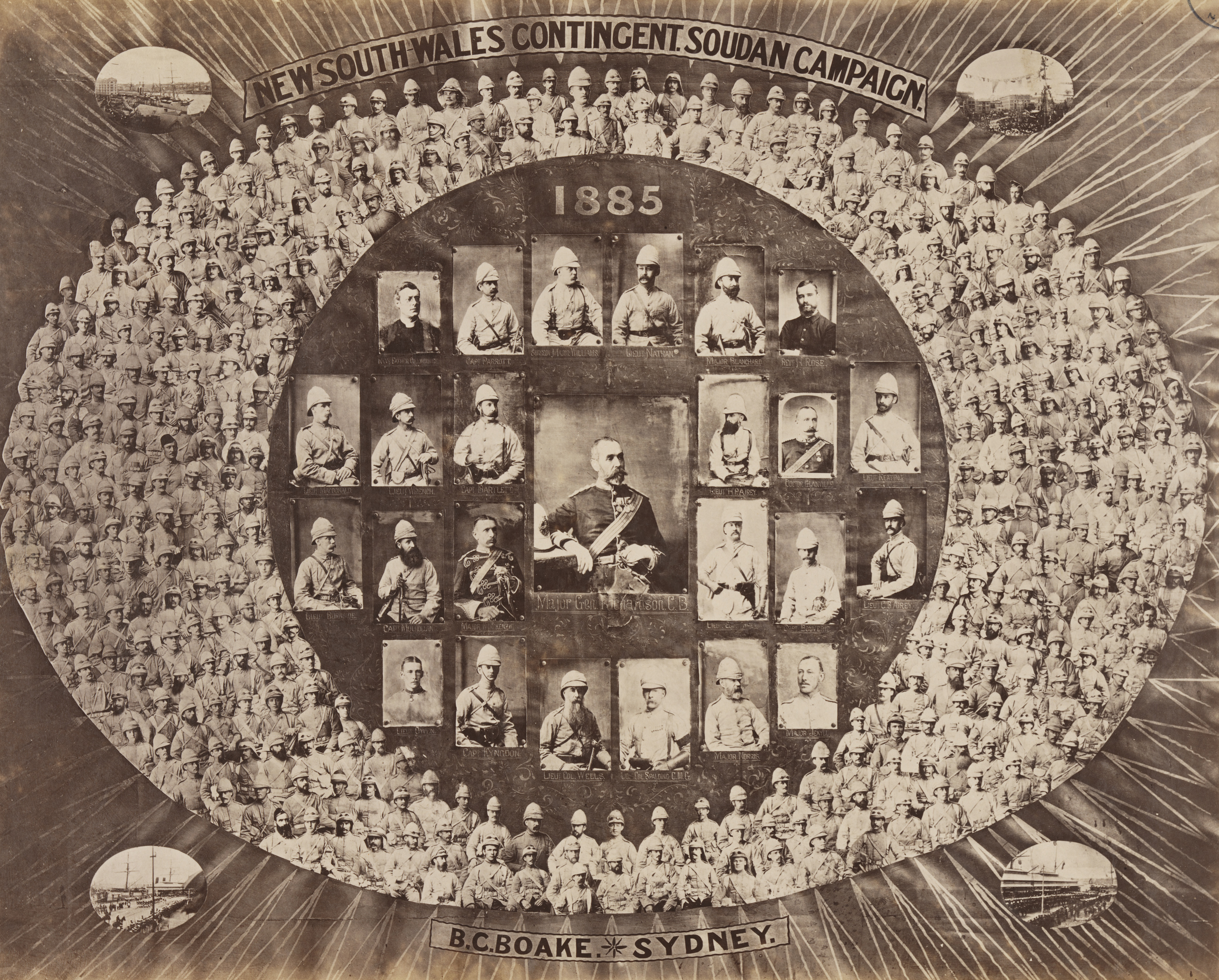
Composite photographic portrait of the New South Wales Contingent, Sudan Campaign, 1885,

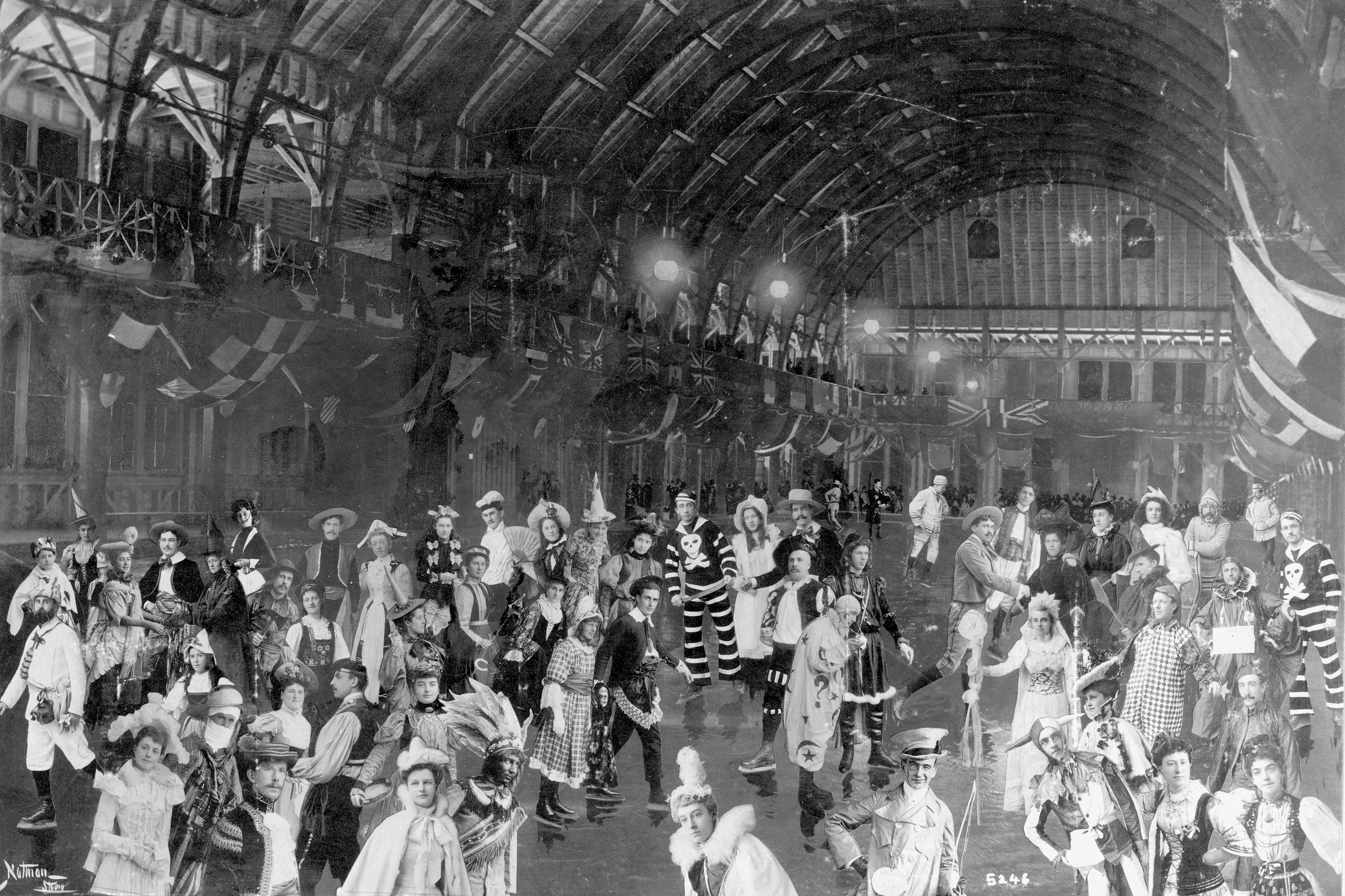
Carnival, South End Exhibition Rink, Halifax, Nova Scotia, Canada, February 1899; The carefully prepared photomontage composite was a Notman specialty, each figure being photographed separately and then combined as a single image

In late Victorian North America, William Notman of Montreal used photomontage to commemorate large social events which could not otherwise be captured on film. Fantasy photomontage postcards were also popular in the late Victorian era and Edwardian era. One of the preeminent producers in this period was the Bamforth & Co Ltd, of Holmfirth, West Yorkshire, and New York. The high point of its popularity came, however, during World War I, when photographers in France, Great Britain, Germany, Austria, and Hungary produced a profusion of postcards showing soldiers on one plane and lovers, wives, children, families, or parents on another. Many of the early examples of fine-art photomontage consist of photographed elements superimposed on watercolours, a combination returned to by (e.g.) George Grosz in about 1915.

=== 20th century ===
==== Heartfield, Grosz, and Dada ====
In 1916, John Heartfield and George Grosz experimented with pasting pictures together, a form of art later named "Photomontage.”

George Grosz wrote, "When John Heartfield and I invented photomontage in my South End studio at five o’clock on a May morning in 1916, neither of us had any inkling of its great possibilities, nor of the thorny yet successful road it was to take. As so often happens in life, we had stumbled across a vein of gold without knowing it."

John Heartfield and George Grosz were members of Berlin Club Dada (1916–1920). The German Dadists were instrumental in making montage into a modern art-form. The term "photomontage” became widely known at the end of World War I, around 1918 or 1919.[5]

Heartfield used photomontage extensively in his innovative book dust jackets for the Berlin publishing house Malik-Verlag. He revolutionized the look of these book covers. Heartfield was the first to use photomontage to tell a “story” from the front cover of the book to the back cover. He also employed groundbreaking typography to enhance the effect.

From 1930 to 1938, John Heartfield used photomontage to create 240 “Photomontages of The Nazi Period” to use art as a weapon against fascism and The Third Reich. The photomontages appeared on street covers all over Berlin on the cover of the widely circulated AIZ magazine published by Willi Münzenberg, Heartfield lived in Berlin until April, 1933, when he escaped to Czechoslovakia after he was targeted for assassination by the SS. Continuing to produce anti-fascist art in Czechoslovakia until 1938, Heartfield's political photomontages earned him the number five position on the Gestapo's Most Wanted List.

Hannah Höch began experimenting with photomontage in 1918. Höch worked for Ullstein Verlag designing knitting and embroidery patterns that were inspired by her photomontage work of the time. She continued to work with photomontage for almost the rest of her life, even after she broke from the Berlin Dadaists.

Other major artists who were members of Berlin Club Dada and major exponents of photomontage were Kurt Schwitters, Raoul Hausmann, and Johannes Baader. Individual photographs combined to create a new subject or visual image proved to be a powerful tool for the Dadists protesting World War I and the interests that they believed inspired the war. Photomontage survived Dada and was a technique inherited and used by European Surrealists such as Salvador Dalí. Its influence also spread to Japan, including within the interwar modernist "New Photography" field (Japanese: Shinkō shashin). Avant-garde painter Harue Koga produced photomontage-style paintings based on images culled from magazines. Japanese poet-photographer Kansuke Yamamoto also experimented with photographic collage and photomontage; in his 1953 collage Reminiscence he superimposed the motif of a cage over a city. The world's first retrospective show of photomontage was held in Germany in 1931. A later term coined in Europe was, "photocollage", which usually referred to large and ambitious works that added typography, brushwork, or even objects stuck to the photomontage.

==== Russian/Soviet Constructivism ====
Parallel to the Germans, Russian Constructivist artists such as El Lissitzky, Alexander Rodchenko, and the husband-and-wife team of Gustav Klutsis and Valentina Kulagina created pioneering photomontage work as propaganda, such as in the journal USSR in Construction, for the Soviet government.

==== In the Americas ====
Following his exile to Mexico in the late 1930s, Spanish Civil War activist and montage artist, Josep Renau Berenguer, compiled his acclaimed, Fata Morgana USA: the American Way of Life, a book of photomontage images highly critical of American culture and North American "consumer culture". His contemporary, Lola Alvarez Bravo, experimented with photomontage on life and social issues in Mexican cities.

In Argentina during the late 1940s, the German exile, Grete Stern, began to contribute photomontage work on the theme of Sueños (Dreams), as part of a regular psychoanalytical article in the magazine, Idilio.

==== Postwar photomontage ====
The pioneering techniques of early photomontage artists were co-opted by the advertising industry from the late 1920s onward. The American photographer Alfred Gescheidt, while working primarily in advertising and commercial art in the 1960s and 1970s, used photomontage techniques to create satirical posters and postcards.

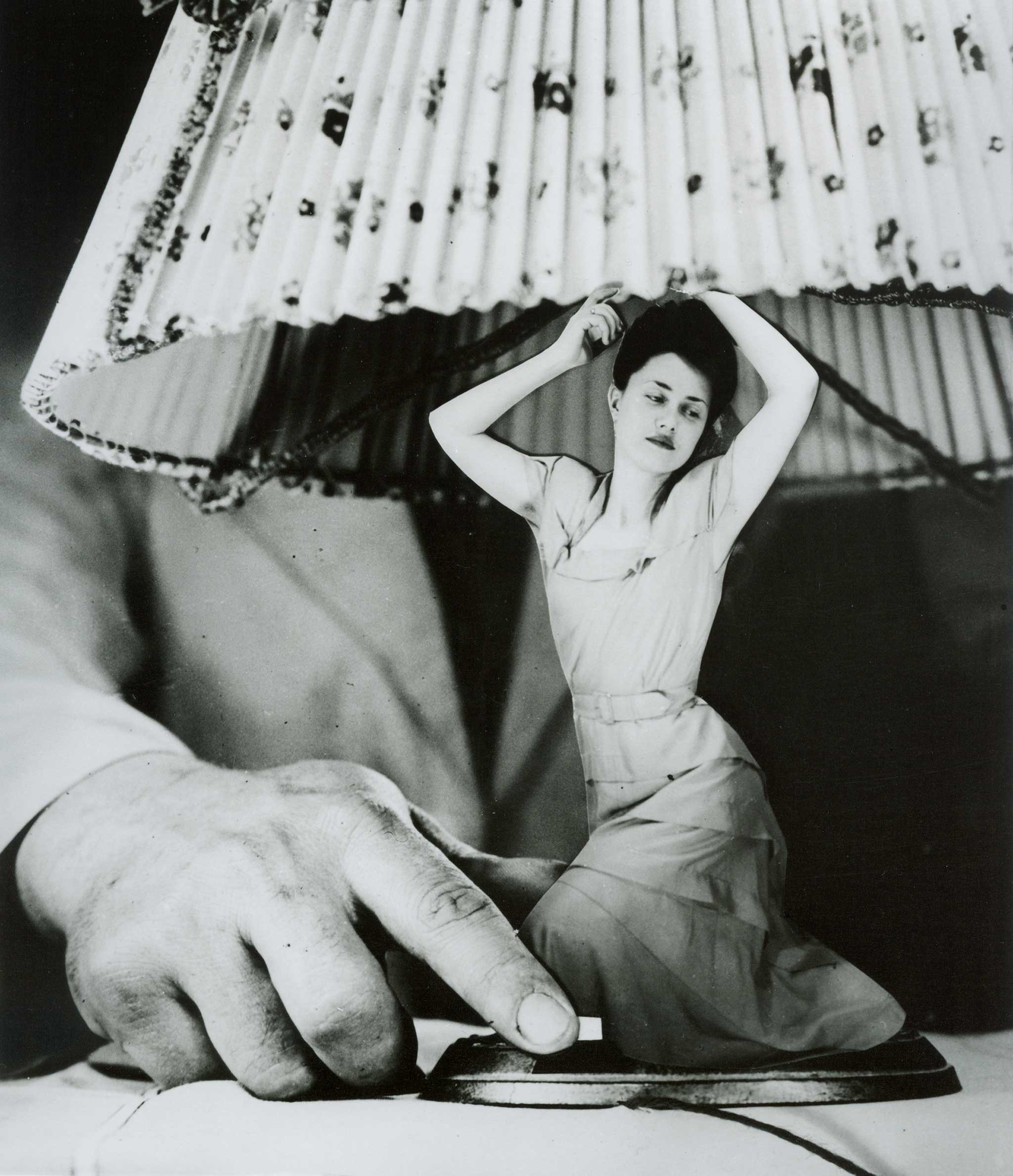
A 1950 photomontage by Grete Stern

Starting in the 1960s, Jerry Uelsmann became influential in the photomontage world, using multiple enlargers to utilize many techniques that would someday influence digital photomontage, down to the naming of tools in Photoshop. In 1985 he even published a book demonstrating and explaining his techniques, two years before Thomas and John Knoll began selling Photoshop through Adobe.

Ten years later in 1995, Adobe's creative director Russel Brown tried to get Uelsmann to test out Photoshop. Uelsmann didn't like it, but his wife Maggie Taylor did, and began using it to produce digital photomontage, becoming a founder of the modern genre.

== Techniques ==
Other methods for combining images are also called photomontage, such as Victorian "combination printing", the printing of more than one negative on a single piece of printing paper (e.g. O. G. Rejlander, 1857), front-projection and computer montage techniques. Much as a collage is composed of multiple facets, artists also combine montage techniques. A series of black and white "photomontage projections" by Romare Bearden (1912–1988) is an example. His method began with compositions of paper, paint, and photographs put on boards measuring 8½ × 11 inches. Bearden fixed the imagery with an emulsion that he then applied with hand roller. Subsequently, he photographed and enlarged them. The nineteenth century tradition of physically joining multiple images into a composite and photographing the results prevailed in press photography and offset lithography until the widespread use of digital image editing.

20th century Xerox technology made possible the ability to copy both flat images and three-dimensional objects using the copier as a scanning camera. Such copier images could then be combined with real objects in a traditional cut-and-glue collage manner.

Contemporary photograph editors in magazines now create "paste-ups" digitally. Creating a photomontage has, for the most part, become easier with the advent of computer software such as Adobe Photoshop, Paint Shop Pro, Corel Photopaint, Pixelmator, Paint.NET, or GIMP. These programs make the changes digitally, allowing for faster workflow and more precise results. They also mitigate mistakes by allowing the artist to "undo" errors. Yet some artists are pushing the boundaries of digital image editing to create extremely time-intensive compositions that rival the demands of the traditional arts. The current trend is to create images that combine painting, theatre, illustration, and graphics in a seamless photographic whole.

== Legal and ethical issues ==
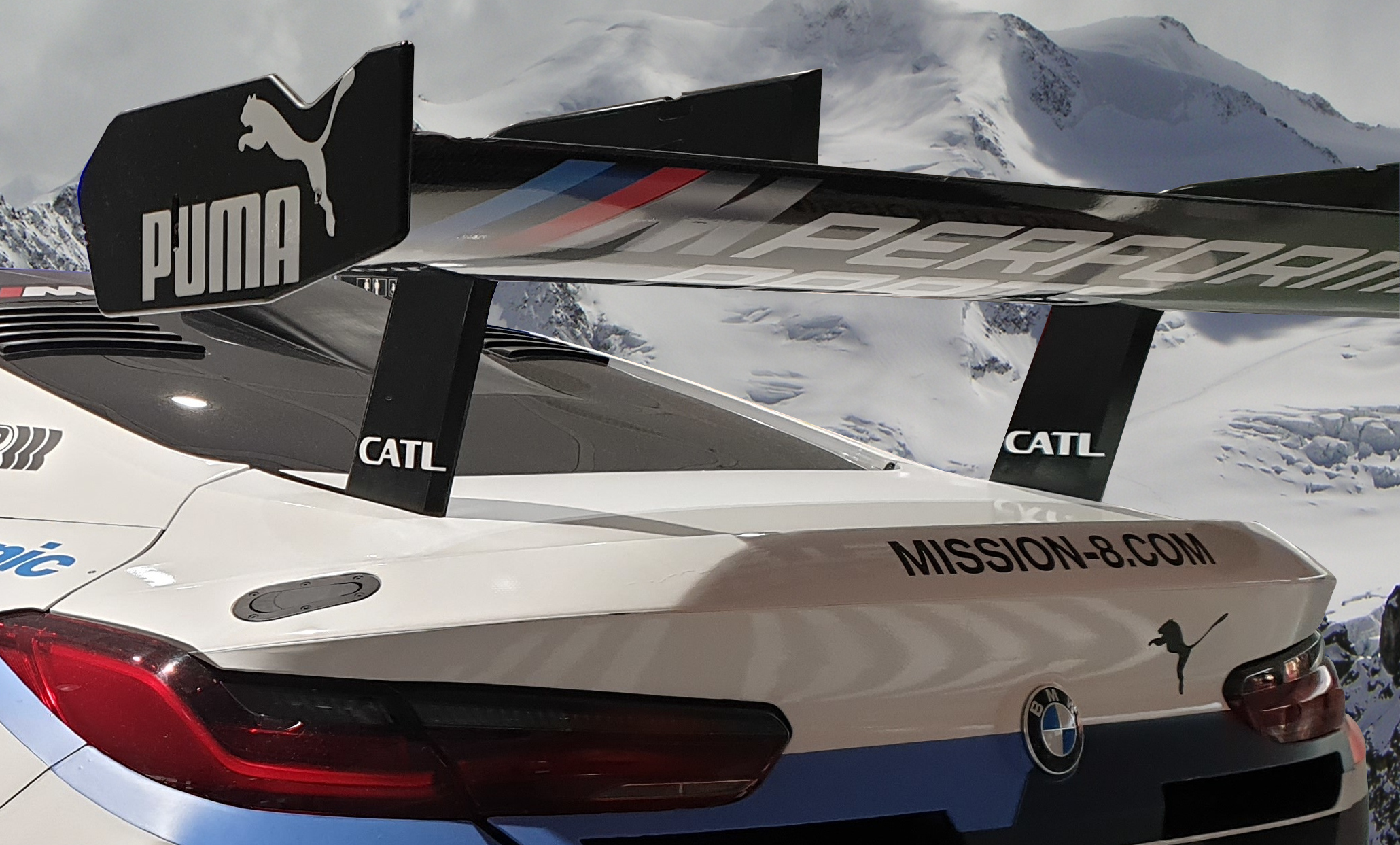
Example for an artificially created, totally misleading image: A race car exhibited at an airport (below) was cropped and combined on a computer with snowy mountains, leading to an image of a situation which never existed.

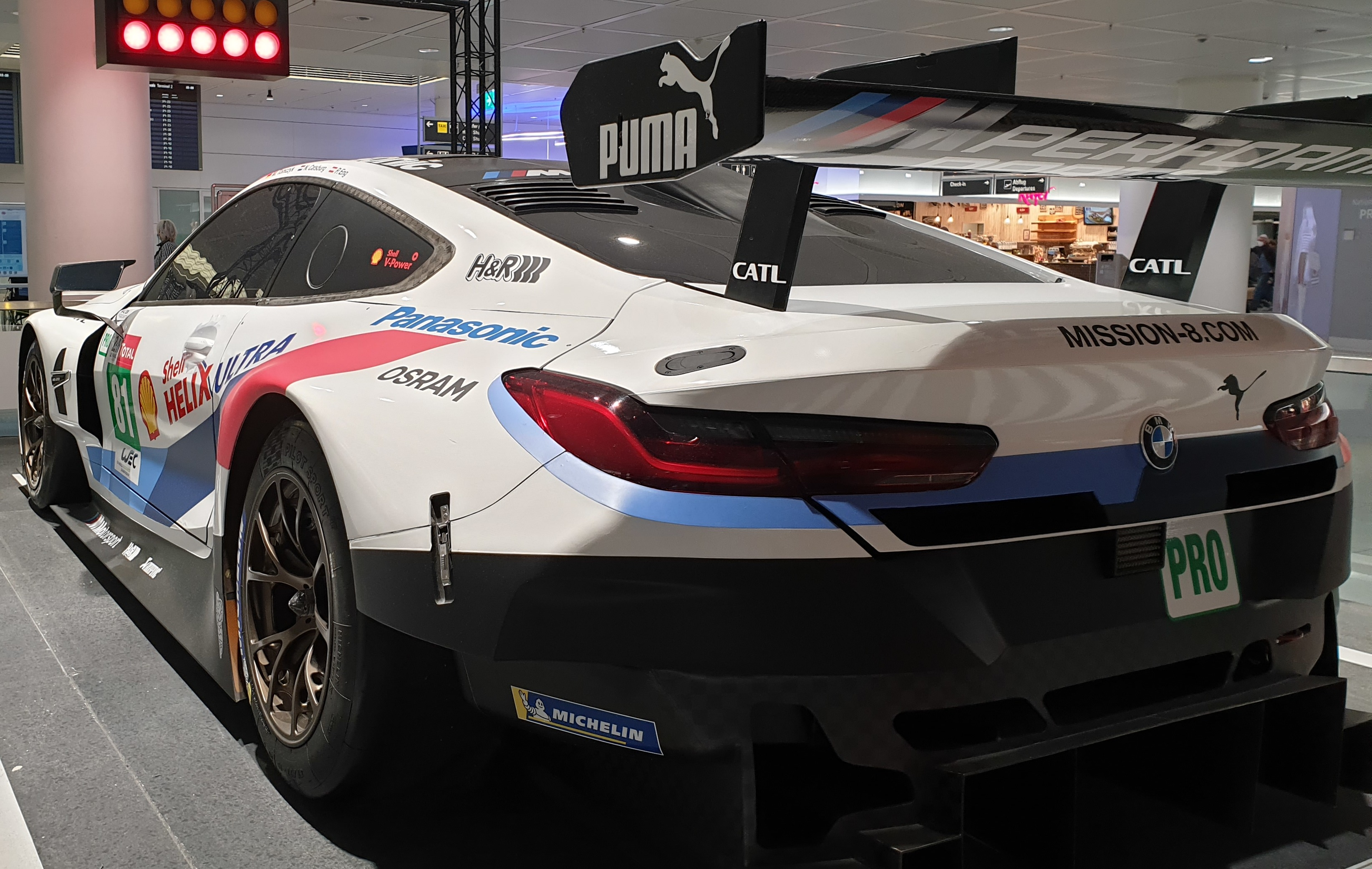
BMW M8 GTE endurance race car at Munich airport in 2021

A photomontage may contain elements at once real and imaginary. Combined photographs and digital manipulations may set up a conflict between aesthetics and ethics – for instance, in fake photographs that are presented to the world as real news. For example, in the United States, the National Press Photographers Association (NPPA) has set out a Code of Ethics promoting the accuracy of published images, advising that photographers "do not manipulate images ... that can mislead viewers or misrepresent subjects."

== Scrapbooking ==
Photomontage also may be present in the scrapbooking phenomenon, in which family images are pasted into scrapbooks and a collage created along with paper ephemera and decorative items.

Digital art scrapbooking employs a computer to create simple collage designs and captions. The amateur scrapbooker can turn home projects into professional output, such as CDs, DVDs, displays on television, uploads to a website for viewing, or assemblies into one or more books for sharing.

== Photograph manipulation ==
Photograph manipulation refers to alterations made to an image. Often, the goal of photograph manipulation is to create another 'realistic' image. This has led to numerous political and ethical concerns, particularly in journalism.

== Gallery ==
=== Examples by modern artists ===
Hannah Höch, Cut with the Kitchen Knife Dada Through the Last Weimar Beer Belly Cultural Epoch of Germany, 1919

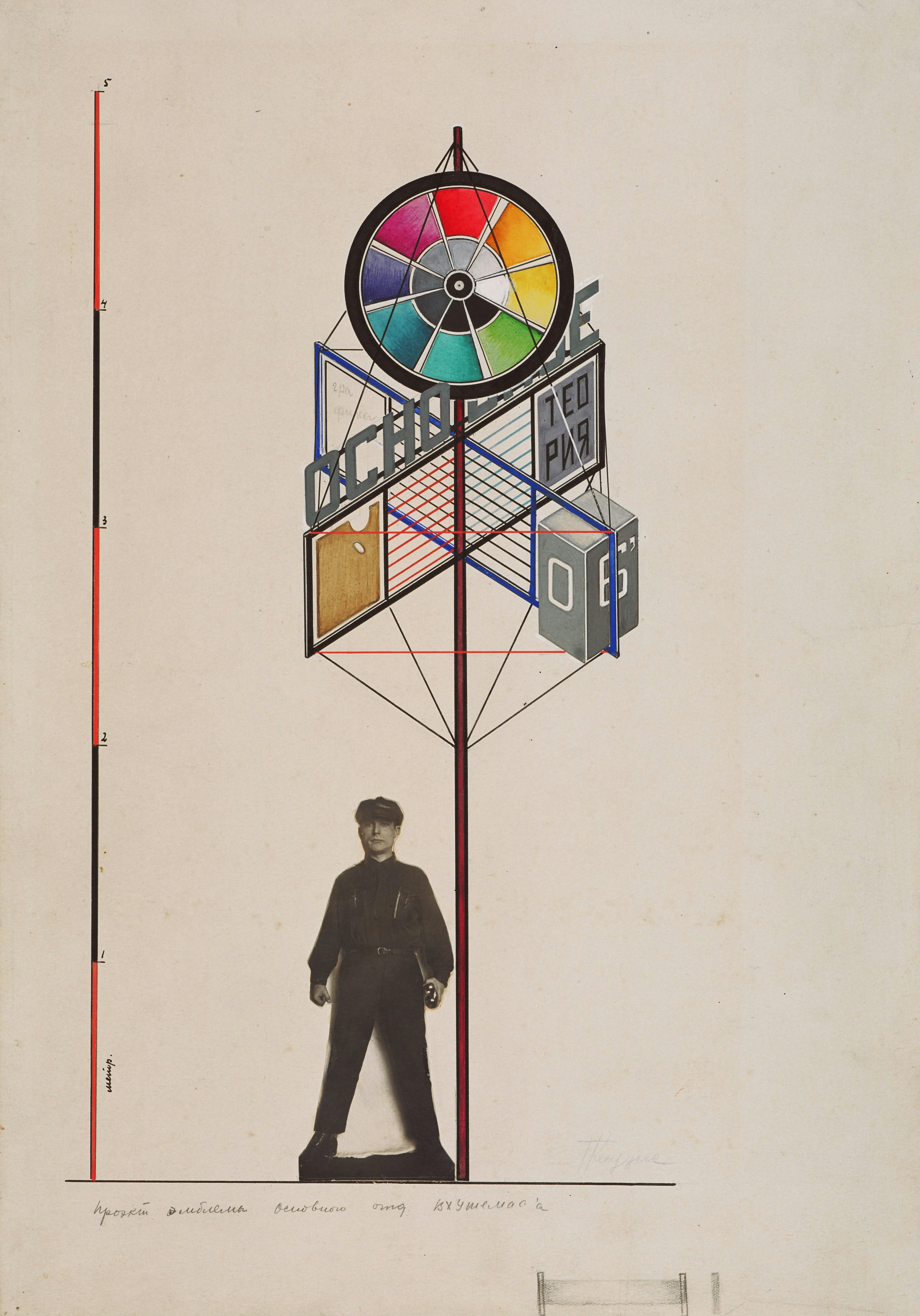
Gustav Klutsis, design for a stand at the entrance to an exhibition, 1920

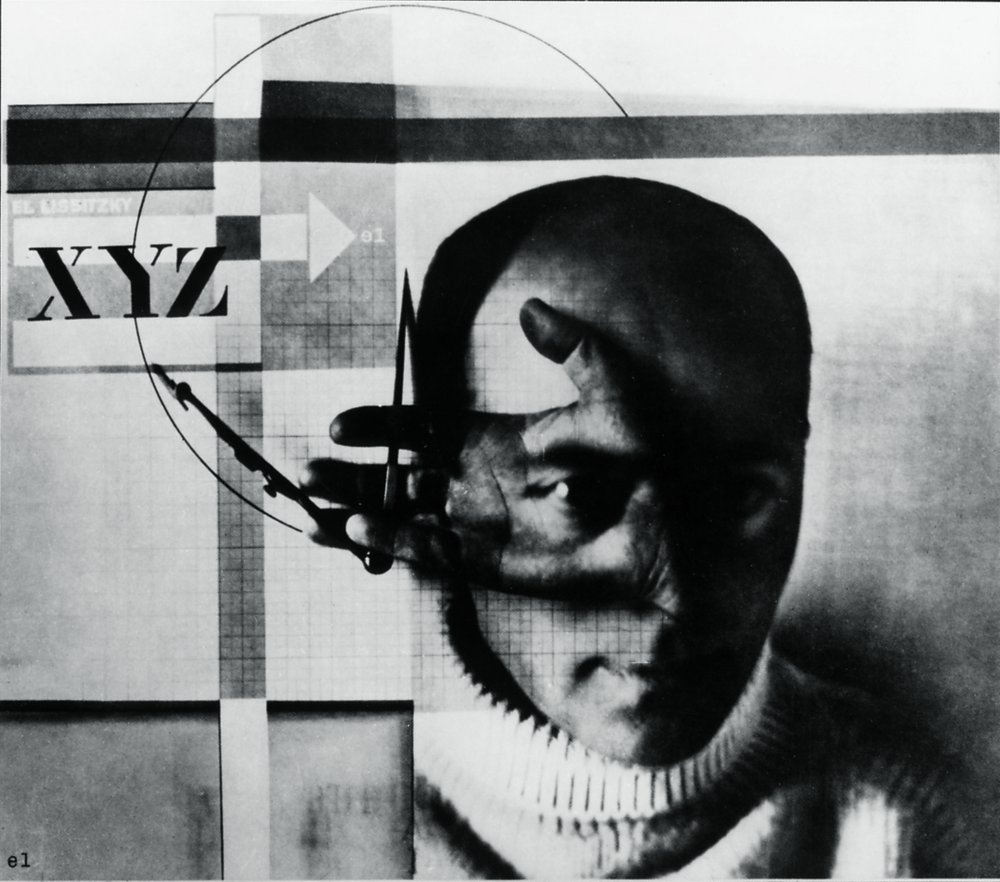
El Lissitzky, The Constructor, 1924

=== Other ===
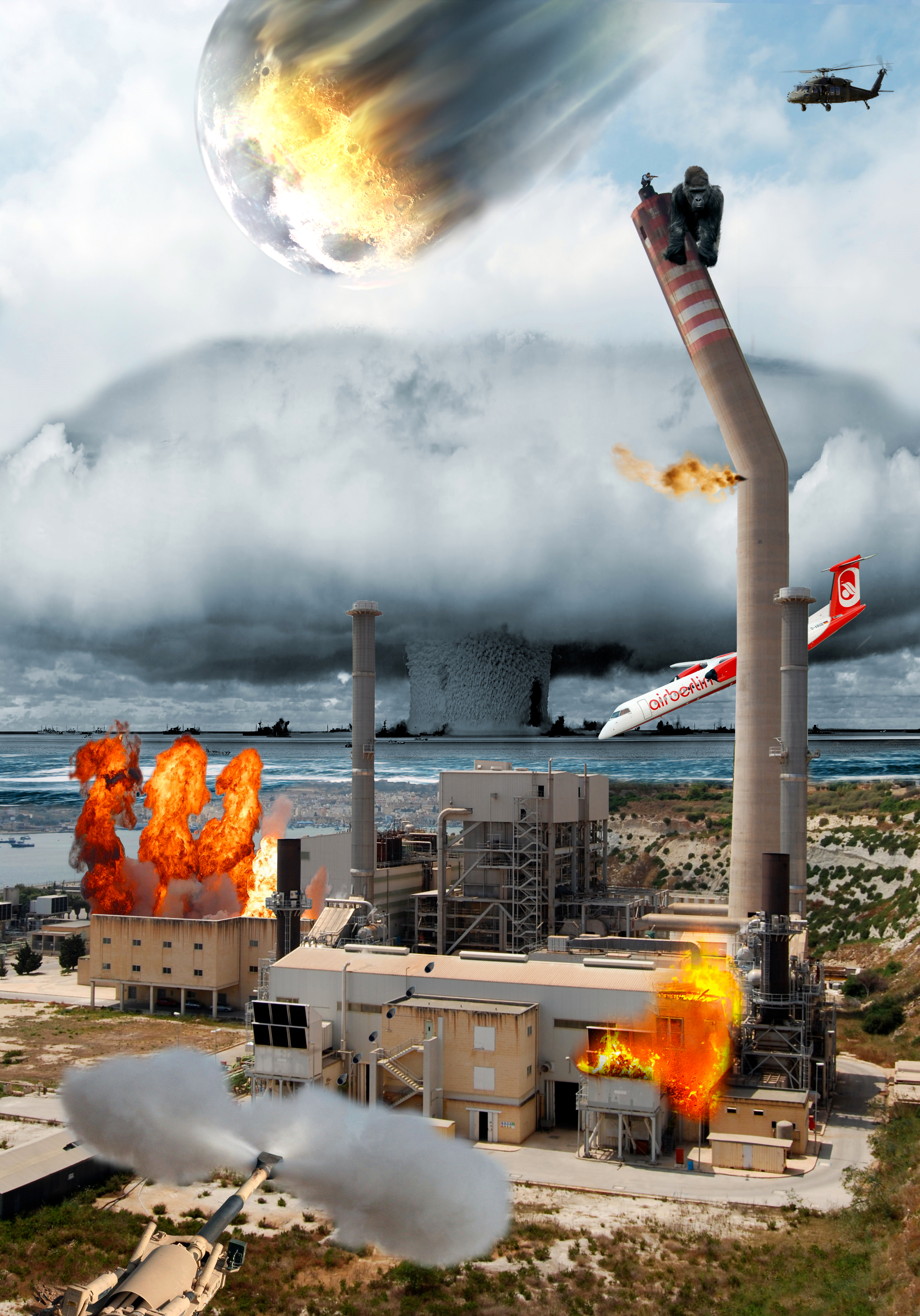
Composite of 11 different images

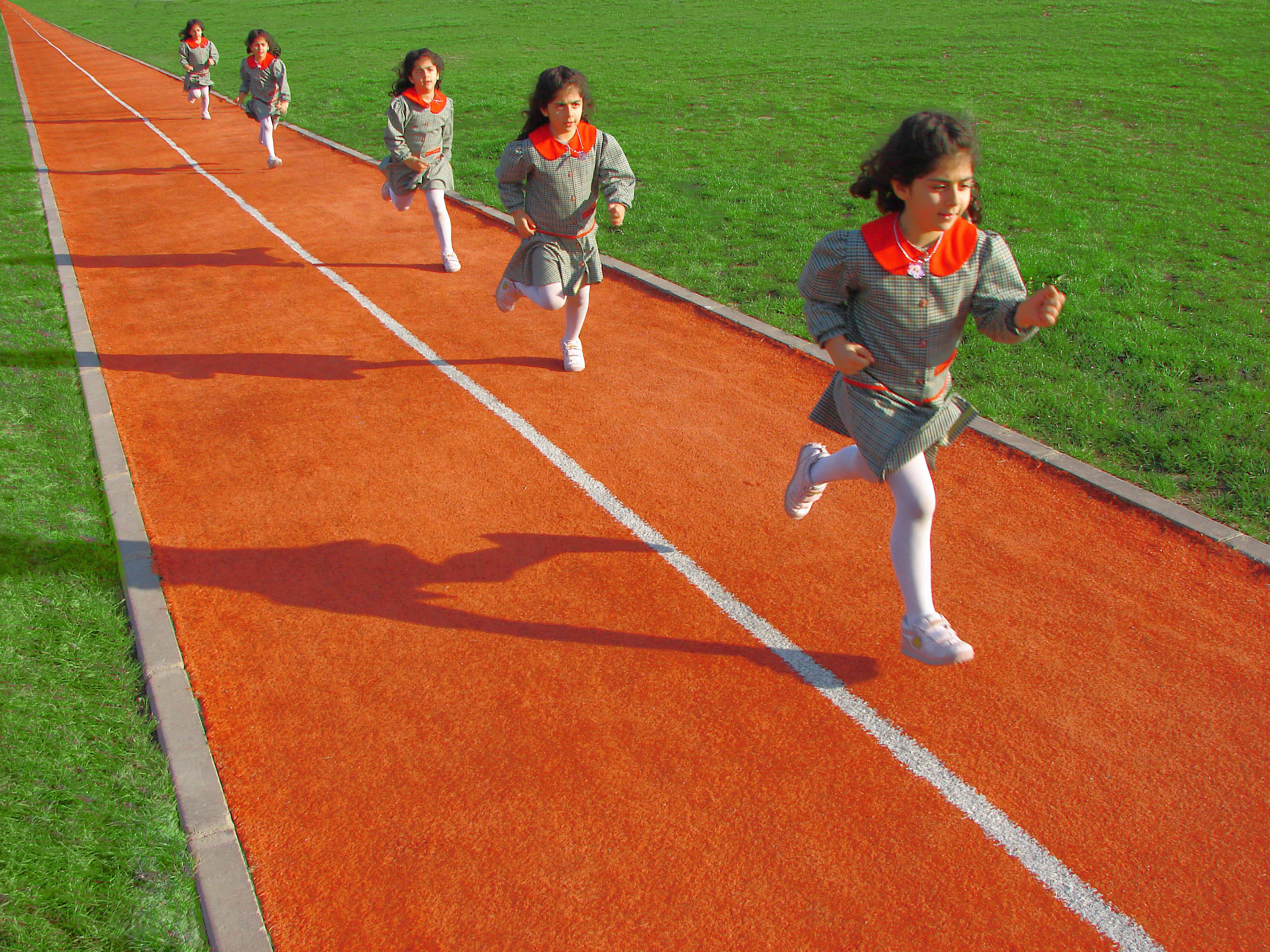
Perspective run

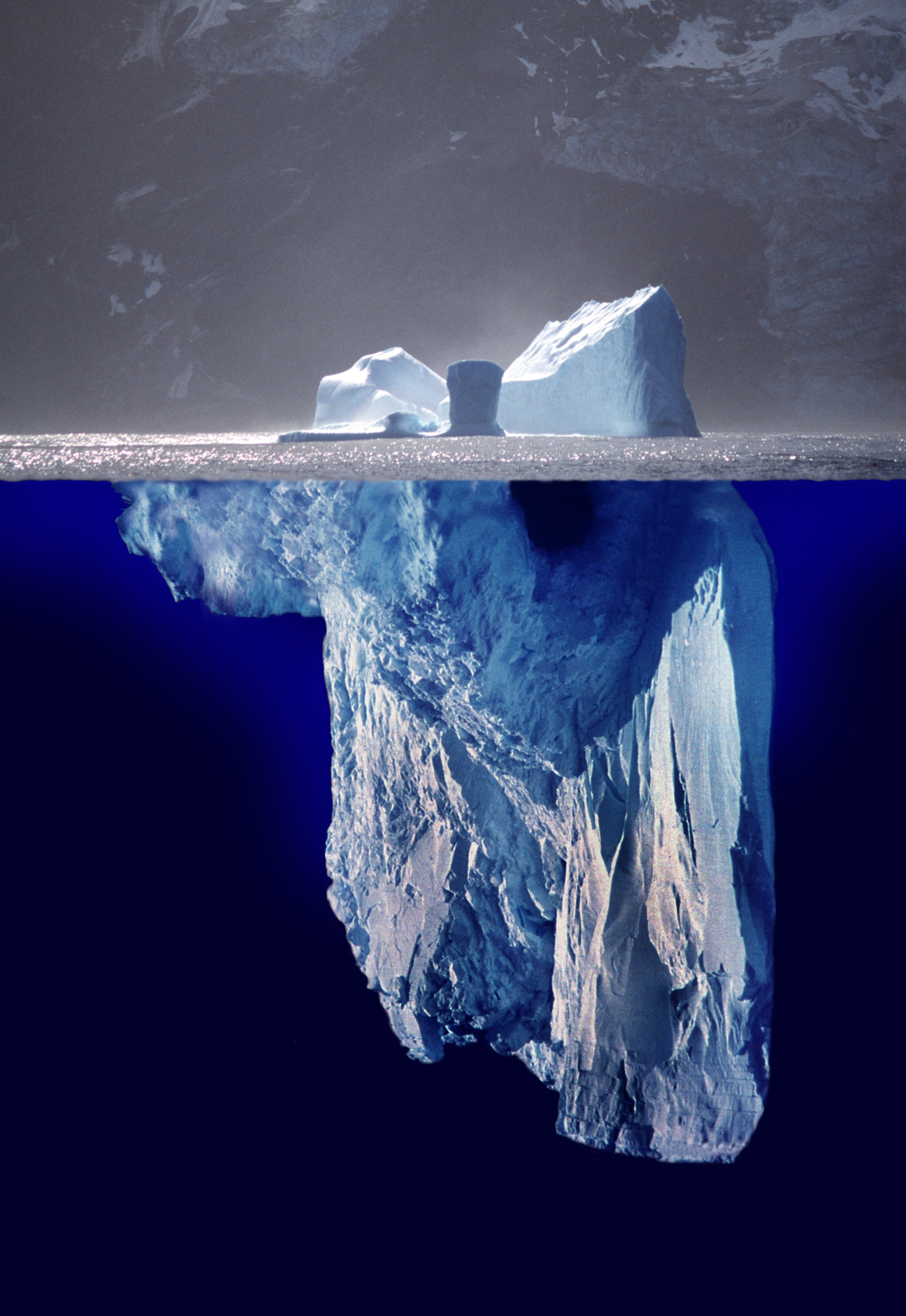
Photomontage showing what a complete iceberg might look like under water

Photocollage

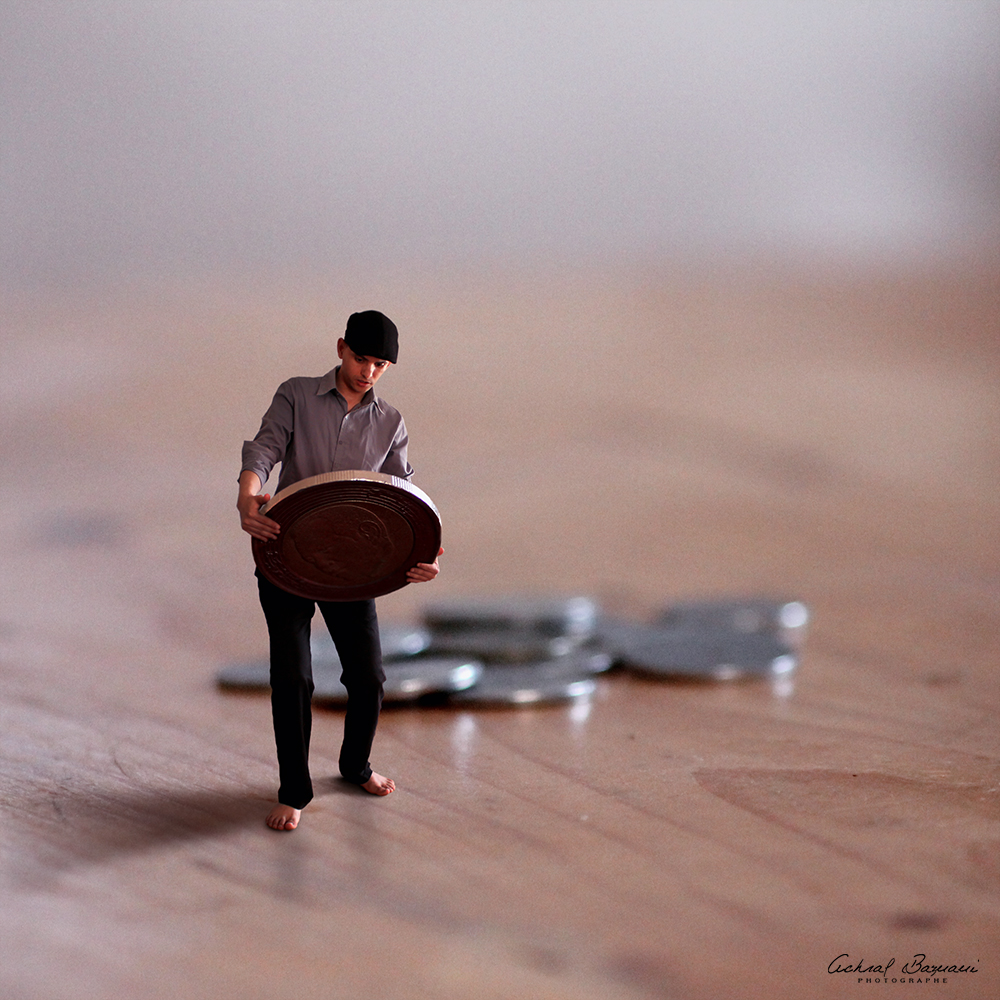
A modern photomontage

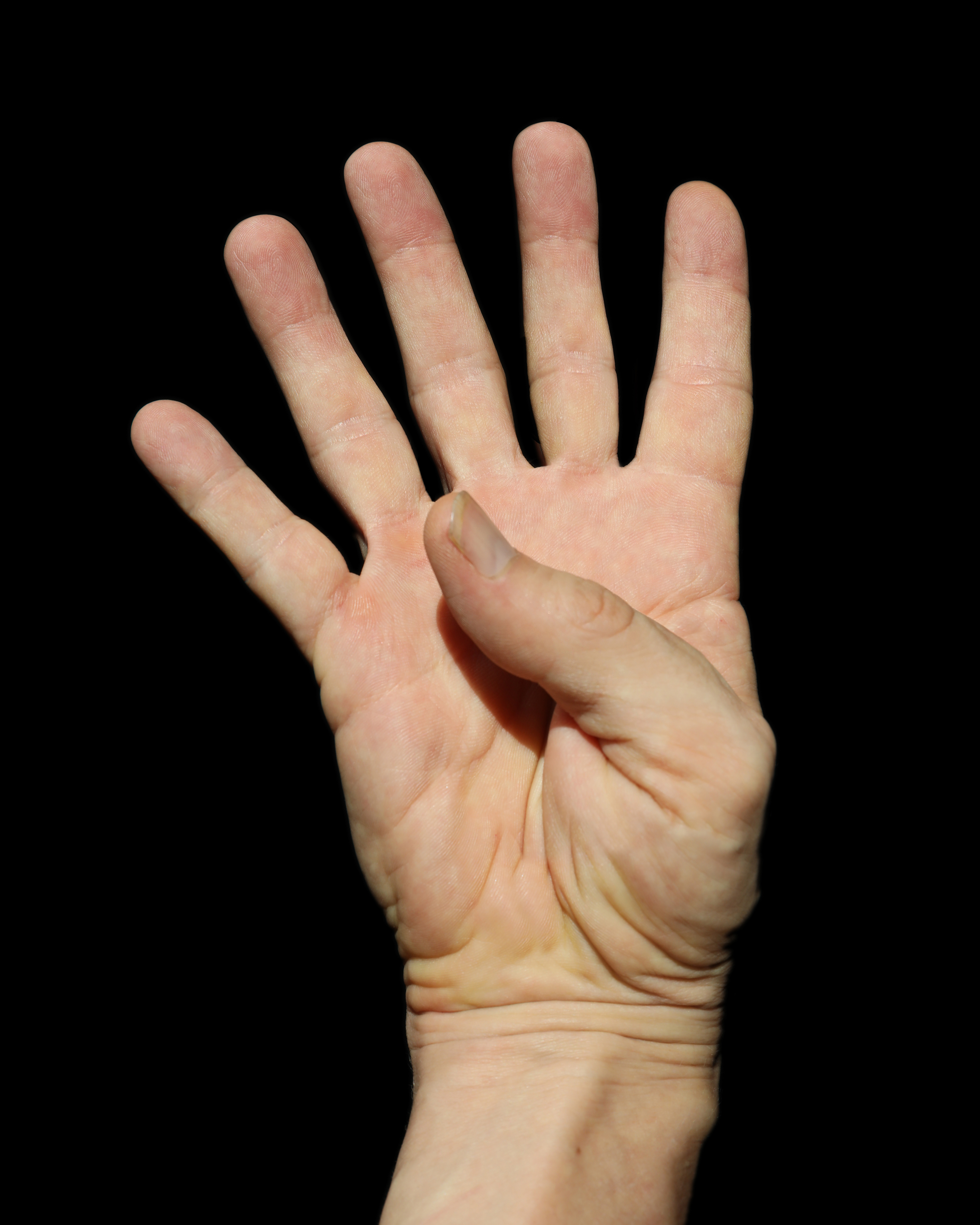
Showing five digits instead of four

== See also ==
- Compositing
- Composograph
- Collage
- Decollage
- Derivative work
- Facial Composite
- Famous photographical manipulations
- Multiple exposure
- Photo mosaic
- Surrealist techniques
- Crimes de la commune
