= Latvian Riflemen =

1915–1920 Russian military unit formed to defend against Germans

- Latviešu strēlnieki Латышские стрелки
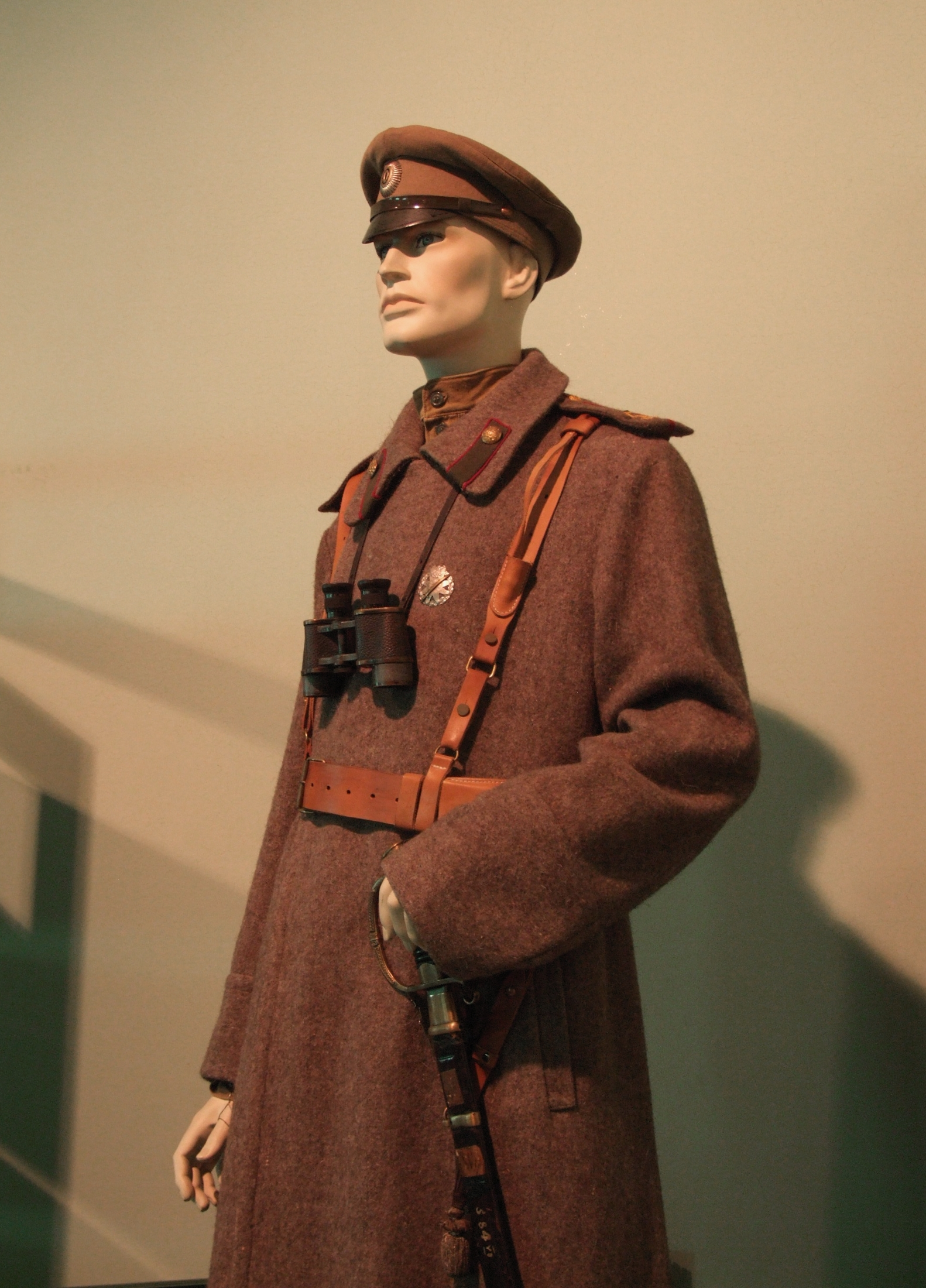
- 1916 uniform of the Latvian Riflemen
- Active: July 1915 – 1920
- Country: Russian Empire (1915–1917); Russian Republic (1917–1918); Soviet Russia (1918–1920); White Movement (1918–1920)
- Branch: Imperial Russian Army (1915–1917); Russian Army (1917–1918); Red Army (1918–1920); White Army (1918–1920)
- Type: Infantry
- Size: ~ 40,000 men
- Part of: Russian 12th Army
- Engagements: World War I; Eastern Front; Defence of Nāves sala; Christmas Battles; Battle of Jugla; Russian Civil War; Estonian War of Independence; Latvian War of Independence; Battle of Daugavpils

Commanders
- Notable commanders: Augusts Ernests Misiņš; Andrejs Auzāns; Rūdolfs Bangerskis; Kārlis Goppers; Frīdrihs Briedis; Jukums Vācietis; Ansis Lielgalvis; Mārtiņš Peniķis; Ansis Zeltiņš; Jānis Francis; Jānis Kalniņš

The Latvian Riflemen (Latvian: Latviešu strēlnieki; Russian: Латышские стрелки, romanized: Latyshskie strelki) were originally a military formation of the Imperial Russian Army assembled starting 1915 in Latvia in order to defend Baltic governorates against the German Empire in World War I. Initially, the battalions were formed by volunteers, and from 1916 by conscription among the Latvian population. A total of about 40,000 troops were drafted into the Latvian Riflemen Division. They were used as an elite force in the Imperial and Red armies.

== Background ==
Towards the end of the 19th century, Riga, the future capital of Latvia, became one of the most industrialized cities in the Russian Empire. The Latvian Social Democratic Workers' Party (LSDRP) was well organized and its leading elements were increasingly sympathetic to the Bolsheviks by the time of the 1905 Revolution. When punitive expeditions were mounted by the state following this, armed resistance groups - often affiliated to the LSDRP - were set up to conduct guerilla warfare against the Tsarist regime. Many of these seasoned fighters were subsequently recruited into the Latvian Riflemen. At the outbreak of war Indriķis Lediņš, the Latvian chief of police in Vladivostok, had called for the establishment of Latvian cavalry units.

== Formation ==
By April 1915, when the Imperial German Army was advancing into Latvian territory, some prominent Latvians, led by deputy Jānis Goldmanis used their position in the State Duma to call on Tsar Nicholas II to establish all-Latvian battalions. As the Germans were advancing into Latvia, they argued, such units would be particularly effective. Latvians knew the area and had high morale because despite the policy of Russification, Latvian nationalist sentiments were more anti-German. At Jelgava two battalions of the Latvian Home Guard had already held back the Imperial German Army.

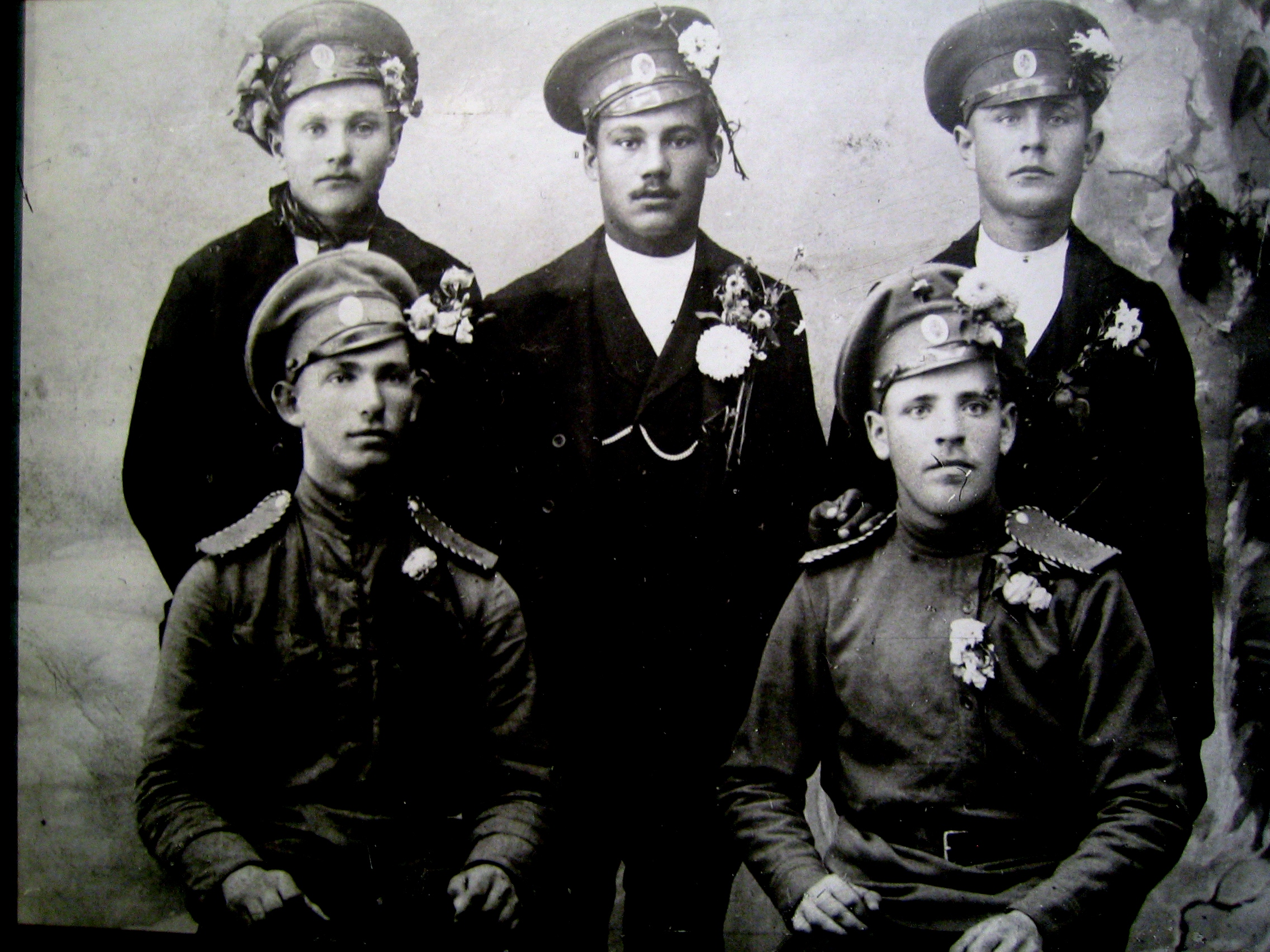
Latvian volunteers from 3rd Kurzeme Riflemen Battalion (1915)

Following increasing German advances, the Russian Stavka under the command of Mikhail Alekseev approved the measure and on 19 July 1915, the tsar approved the formation of the Latvian Riflemen. On the same day Latvian deputies of the State Duma, Jānis Goldmanis and Jānis Zālītis published a patriotic appeal "Gather under Latvian flags!" (Pulcējaties zem latviešu karogiem!) in Riga. The first volunteers started to apply on August 12 at Riga. Originally, the plan was to form two battalions, but due to the high numbers of volunteers three battalions were formed.

The departure of the first Latvian volunteers from Riga to basic training transformed into a wide national demonstration since the Riflemen units were the first Latvian military units with Latvian commanders in charge. The first battalions consisted mainly of volunteers, especially refugees from Courland and workers from the factories evacuated to inner Russia from Riga. Later a number of Latvians from other Russian units joined or were transferred to the Latvian Riflemen.

== World War I ==
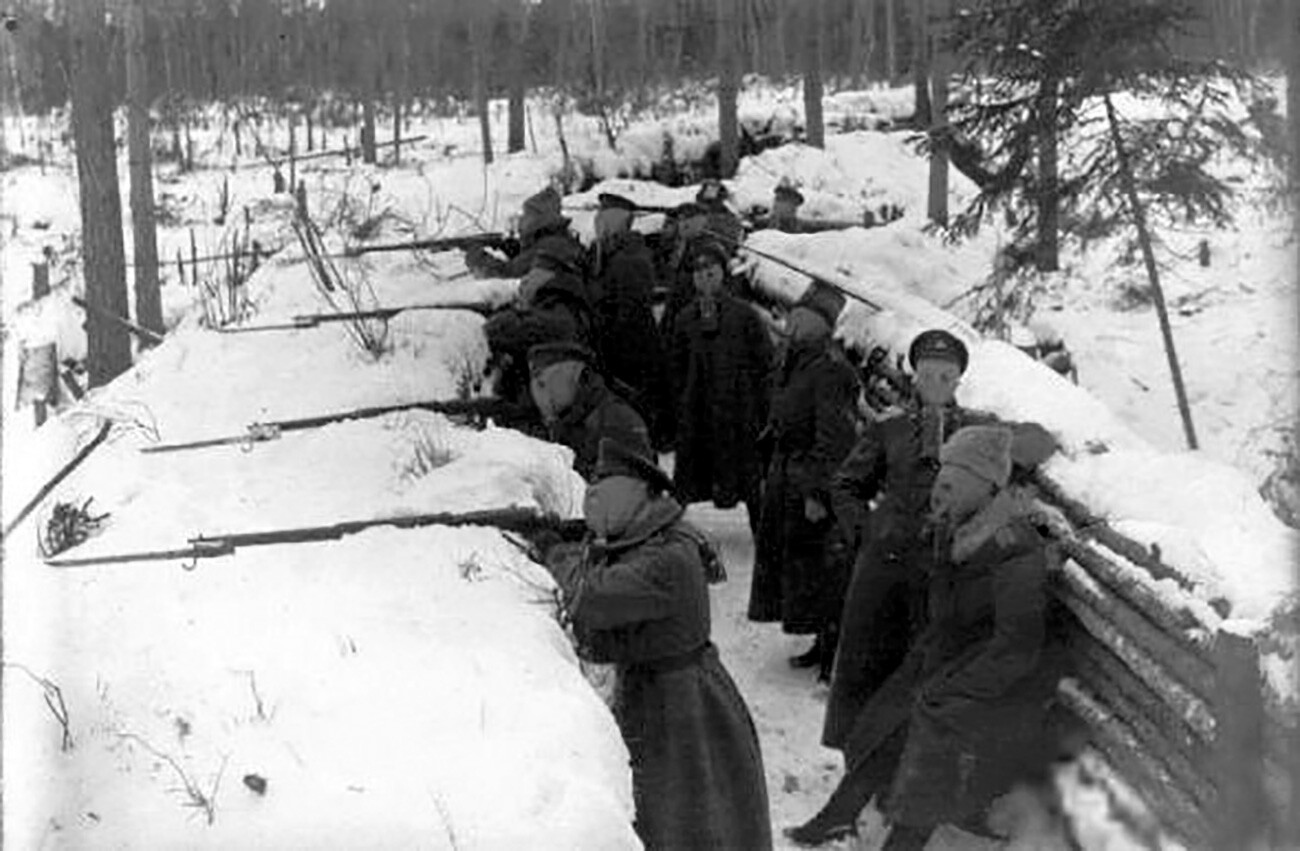
Latvian Riflemen in the trenches during the Christmas Battles

From 1915 to 1917, the Latvian Riflemen fought in the Imperial Russian Army against the Imperial German Army in positions along the Daugava river. In 1916, Latvian battalions were transformed into regiments as conscription started among the local population. Also, many new riflemen units were formed. In total, eight combat and one reserve regiment were formed. In December 1916 and January 1917, the Latvian riflemen suffered heavy casualties in the month-long Christmas Battles, which began with a surprise attack on German positions during Christmas. Latvian riflemen managed to break the German line of defence but the effort was in vain as the attack was not followed through. The Imperial Russian Army lost over 26,000 soldiers in the failed attack. The casualties included 9,000 Latvian riflemen, about a third of the total number at that time. This caused great resentment against the Russian generals and the Tsar among the riflemen, which led to increased support for the Bolsheviks, who were advocating an end to the war. The fallen Latvian Riflemen were buried at the Brothers' Cemetery in Riga, created for this purpose.

The structure of the United Latvian Riflemen division, formed in 1917:

1. Latvian Riflemen brigade

- 1st Daugavgriva Latvian Rifle Regiment
- 2. Riga Latvian Riflemen Regiment
- 3. Kurzeme Latvian Riflemen Regiment
- 4th Vidzeme Latvian Riflemen Regiment

2. Latvian Riflemen brigade

- 5. Zemgale Latvian Riflemen Regiment
- 6. Tukums Latvian Riflemen Regiment
- 7. Bauska Latvian Riflemen Regiment
- 8. Valmiera Latvian Riflemen Regiment

== Red Latvian Riflemen ==
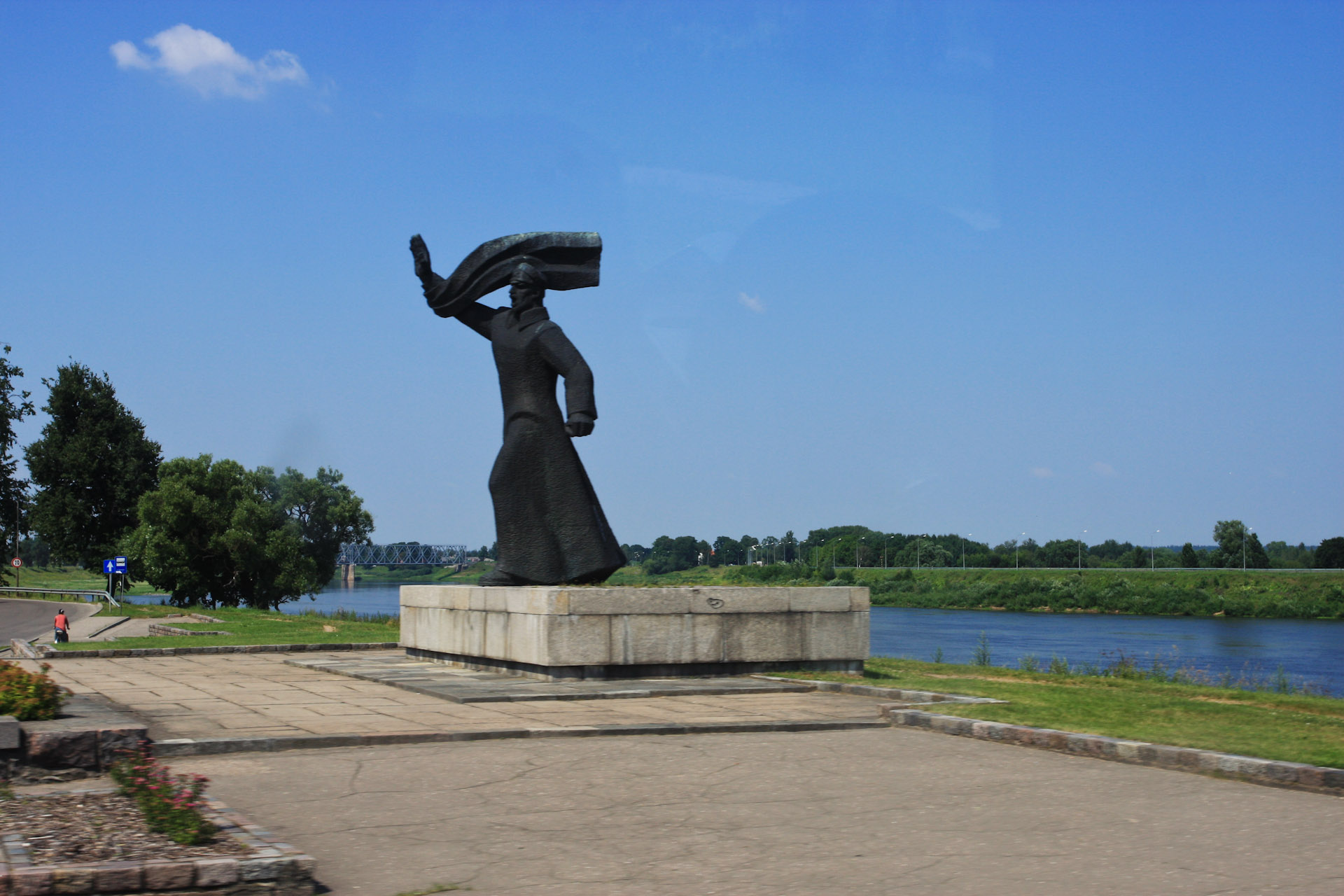
Soviet-era monument for the Latvian Riflemen in Daugavpils.

Following the February Revolution, the Latvian Riflemen regiments underwent a process of Bolshevization and from May 1917, large parts of the regiments began transferring their loyalty to the Bolsheviks. In Latvian and Soviet historiography they became known as Red Latvian Riflemen (Latvian: Latviešu sarkanie strēlnieki, Russian: красные латышские стрелки, romanized: krasnye latyshkie strelki) and actively participated in the Russian Civil War. The Soviet Latvian Riflemen Division under the command of Jukums Vācietis, a former Latvian Riflemen colonel, became the first regular division in the Red Army. The division took an active part in the suppression of anti-Bolshevik uprisings in Moscow (Left SR uprising) and Yaroslavl (Yaroslavl Uprising) in 1918, and fought against the Czechoslovak Legion and later against the forces of the White Generals Denikin, Yudenich, and Wrangel. Thanks to battlefield successes, in September 1918 Jukums Vācietis was appointed the first commander-in-chief of the Red Army.

During the Latvian War of Independence, the Soviet Latvian Riflemen Division was instrumental in the attempt to establish Soviet rule in Latvia as the Red Latvian Riflemen were initially welcomed as liberators from German occupation. On the basis of the Soviet Latvian Riflemen Division the Army of Soviet Latvia was created and by the end of January 1919 it liberated most of Latvia except for a small area around Liepāja. Despite the success, from spring 1919 onwards it began to suffer great losses of personnel due to increasingly unpopular Bolshevik policies among the Latvian Riflemen and Latvians generally, such as revolutionary tribunals and grain requisitioning. The Army of Soviet Latvia was ultimately defeated by the Baltic Landeswehr and German Freikorps under the joint command of General von der Goltz and newly formed Separate Latvian Brigade initially under Colonel Oskars Kalpaks and later under Colonel Jānis Balodis, who were loyal to the Latvian Republic in western Latvia; by the Estonian Army including the North Latvian Brigade, and finally by a joint campaign of the Polish and new Latvian army in Latgale, south-eastern Latvia. The remaining Red Latvian Riflemen were consolidated into the Latvian Riflemen Division and were re-deployed to other fronts of the Russian Civil War.

After victory in the Oryol-Kromy operation against Denikin in October 1919, the Latvian Riflemen Division received the highest military recognition of that time: the Honorable Red Flag of VTsIK. In 1920 the Latvian Riflemen Division played a key role in the Perekop-Chongar and Northern Taurida Operations against Wrangel where it suffered heavy loses with entire regiments getting surrounded and completely destroyed.

Following the 1920 peace treaty between Latvia and Bolshevik Russia, the Latvian Riflemen Division was dissolved and 11,395 former Red Latvian Riflemen returned to Latvia.

Other former Red Latvian Riflemen remained in Soviet Russia and rose to leadership positions in the Red Army, especially the GRU, the Communist Party, and the Cheka. Among them were: Kirils Stucka, Teodors Eihmanis, Eduards Bērziņš, Jānis Lācis, Jānis Fabriciuss, Juris Aploks, Reinholds Bērziņš, Žanis Blumbergs, Konstantīns Neimanis, Jānis Gailītis and many others. Many of them were later executed in the so-called Latvian Operation of the NKVD during the Great Purge. When the USSR occupied Latvia in 1940, the surviving Red Latvian Riflemen returned to Latvia.

== White Latvian Riflemen ==
In 1917, a smaller number of Latvian Riflemen, mostly officers, sided against the Bolsheviks. Officers such as Kārlis Goppers and Frīdrihs Briedis tried to prevent Bolshevik ideas from spreading among the Latvian soldiers and became founding members of the Union for the Defense of the Motherland and Freedom. The bloody Christmas and January battles impeded their efforts to fight against Bolshevik ideology. Opponents of Bolshevism either left or were forced to leave military service or joined the White forces. During the last phase of the Civil War, two Latvian units were created in the Urals and Far East of Russia (Troitsk Battalion and Imanta Regiment), but they did not take part in significant military action and were sent to Latvia, by then already an independent nation.

== Legacy ==
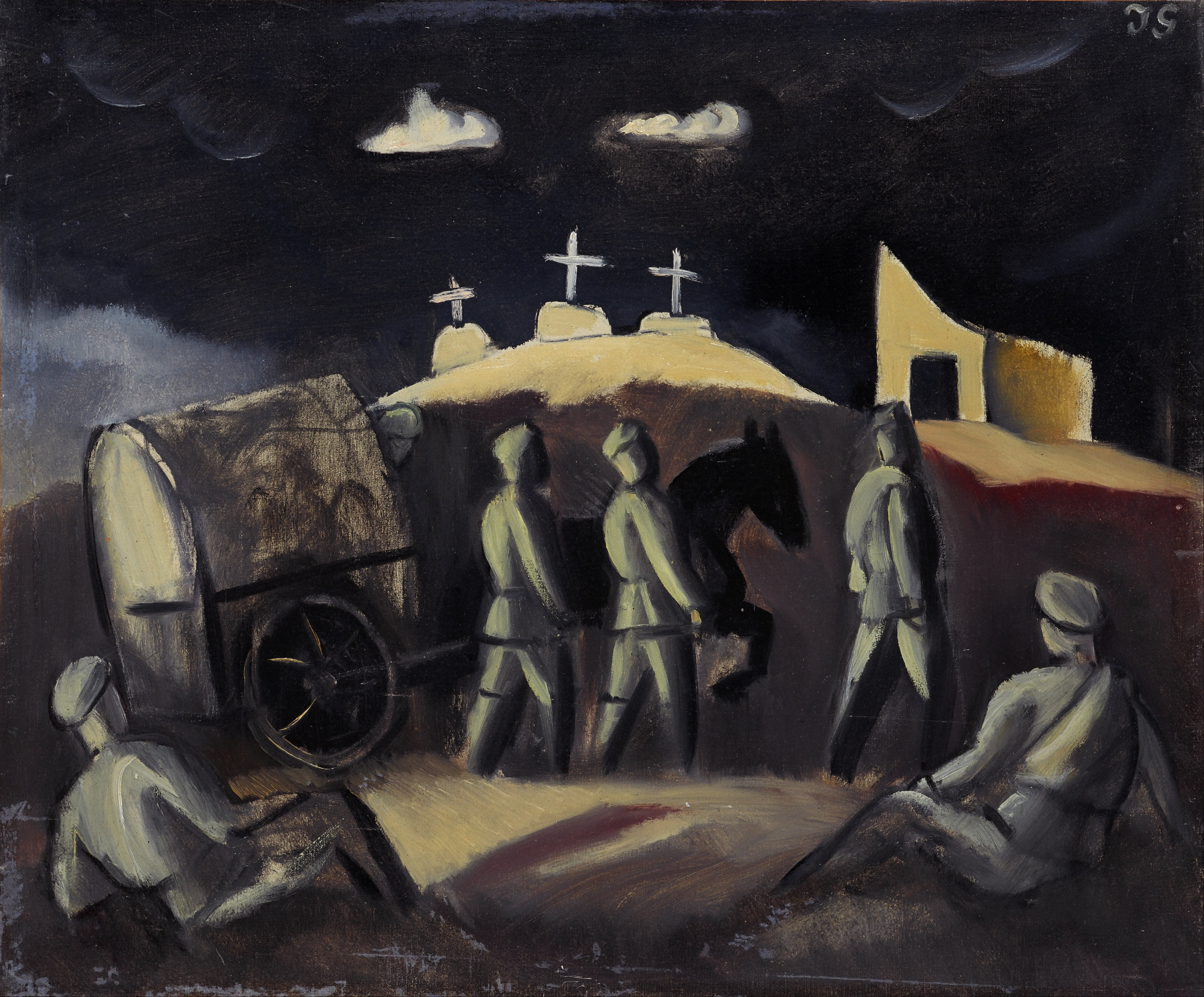
White Crosses (1916) by Jāzeps Grosvalds

The Latvian Riflemen have been a long-lasting source of inspiration in Latvian art. Many writers, poets and painters have been inspired by the Latvian Rifles and their battles. The most notable works are:

- A collection of epic poetry about Latvian Riflemen and their battles in Latvia and Russia, Mūžības skartie (Affected by Eternity) by poet Aleksandrs Čaks.
- Historical novel Blizzard of Souls (Dvēseļu putenis) by writer Aleksandrs Grīns, himself a former riflemen. The main protagonist of the novel is a young Latvian schoolboy who enlists in a Latvian rifle unit. In 2019 a film based on the novel premiered.
- A series of paintings (Latvian Riflemen 1916–1917 and Refugees 1915–1917) by the Latvian painter Jāzeps Grosvalds, who had also served in Latvian Riflemen units.

The Latvian pagan metal band Skyforger has the album Latviešu strēlnieki dedicated to the Latvian Riflemen and their battles in the World War I.

A former Latvian rifleman is the protagonist of the 2007 film Defenders of Riga, set in the final days of World War I and the subsequent Latvian War of Independence.

The Latvian riflemen appear as a squad option in the 2019 first person shooter title Tannenberg.

== See also ==
- 4th Rifle Division (Poland)
- Aftermath of World War I
- Estonian Liberation War
- Estonian Red Riflemen
- Freikorps in the Baltic
- Latvian War of Independence
- Lithuanian Riflemen's Union
- Ober Ost
- Polish Rifle Squads
- Ukrainian Sich Riflemen

== Sources ==
- Ezergailis, Andrew (1983). The Latvian Impact on the Bolshevik Revolution: The First Phase: September 1917 to April 1918. Boulder, CO: East European Monographs. ISBN 978-0-88033-035-0. OCLC 10398126.
- Leonard, Raymond (2007). From War through Revolution: The Story of the Latvian Rifles (PDF). Nebraska, CO: 32nd Annual European Studies Conference. Archived from the original (PDF) on 2011-06-12.
- Swain, Geoffrey (1999). "The Disillusioning of the Revolution's Praetorian Guard: The Latvian Riflemen, Summer–Autumn 1918" (PDF). Europe-Asia Studies. 51 (4): 667–686. doi:10.1080/09668139998840.
- Latvian: Latvju revolucionarais strēlneeks. Red. R.Apinis, V.Strauss, K.Stucka, P.Vīksne. I; II sējums. Maskava: Prometejs, 1934.; 1935 OCLC 082234573, OCLC 94148838
- "Archigos : A Data Set of Leaders 1875—2004" (PDF). Archived from the original (PDF) on 11 July 2007.
- Gordon, Frank. "Latvia: The Good Years". Archived from the original on 2007-04-08.
