= Ķoņi Parish =

Parish of Latvia

- parish of Latvia
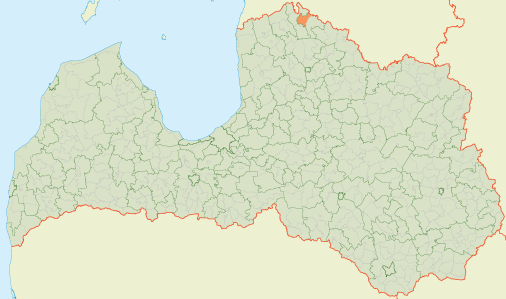
- 57°56′33″N 25°22′09″E
- Country: Latvia

Area
  - Total: 88.28 km^{2} (34.09 sq mi)
  - Land: 86.78 km^{2} (33.51 sq mi)
  - Water: 1.5 km^{2} (0.58 sq mi)

Population (1 January 2025)
  - Total: 557
  - Density: 6.42/km^{2} (16.6/sq mi)

Ķoņi Parish (Latvian: Ķoņu pagasts) is an administrative unit of Valmiera Municipality in the Vidzeme region of Latvia.

== Notable residents ==
- Gustav Klutsis
- Kārlis Kalniņš
