= Christmas Battles =

Battles on the Eastern Front of WWI

- Part of the Eastern Front of the First World War
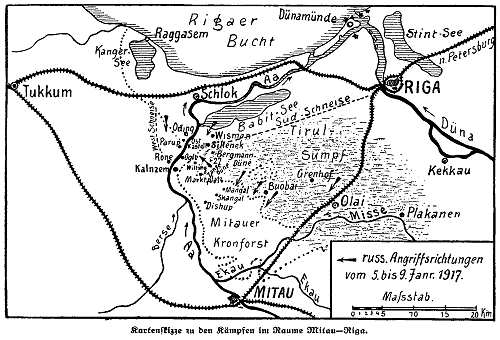
- German scheme of the Riga front and Christmas battles
Date	Russian offensive: 23 – 29 December 1916 (O.S.); 5 – 11 January 1917 (N.S.); German counterattack: 9 – 21 January 1917 (O.S.)
Location	Tīreļpurvs (Tīrelis Swamp) near Riga
Result	Russian victory

Belligerents
Germany	Russian Empire

Commanders and leaders
(German Empire) Friedrich von Scholtz	Nikolai Ruzsky; Radko Dimitriev

Units involved
(German Empire) 8th Army	12th Army

Strength
Unknown	189,000

Casualties and losses
3,500, including 1,000 captured	23,000

The Christmas Battles (Latvian: Ziemassvētku kaujas; German: Aa-Schlachten; Russian: Митавская операция) were offensive operations conducted by the Imperial Russian Army and Latvian Riflemen during World War I in the area of Jelgava, Latvia, by the Russian 12th Army of the Northern Front. The operation took place from 23 December until 29 December 1916 according to the Julian Calendar (or 5 January to 11 January according to the Gregorian Calendar). The 12th Army was commanded by Gen. Radko Dimitriev; it was opposed by the German 8th Army.

The battles took place in a swampy region, Tīreļpurvs (Tīrelis bog), between Lake Babīte and Jelgava. The main assault force was the 6th Siberian Rifle Corps which included two Latvian Riflemen brigades ("strēlnieki" who became a part of Latvian folklore and an important factor in the Latvian national awakening movement).

== Background ==
The German 8th Army's advance was stopped near Riga in October 1915. Almost immediately German forces began fortifying their positions. A huge, 30 kilometre long wall (the so-called: German Wall) built out of sand and wood was constructed across Tīreļpurvs, separating both armies for more than a year.

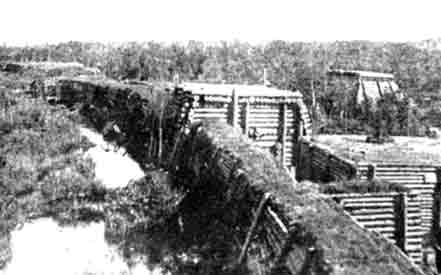
German fortification German Wall across the Tīrelis Swamp.

Also a railway line was constructed for the delivery of ammunition. The Russian 12th Army was divided into three groups before it attacked. The main task force was the Babīte group which consisted of 48 battalions and 208 cannons. On the opposite side were 19 German battalions from the 6th Landwehr Brigade. The core of the Babīte group was the 6th Siberian Corps. which included both Latvian Riflemen brigades.

== The battle ==
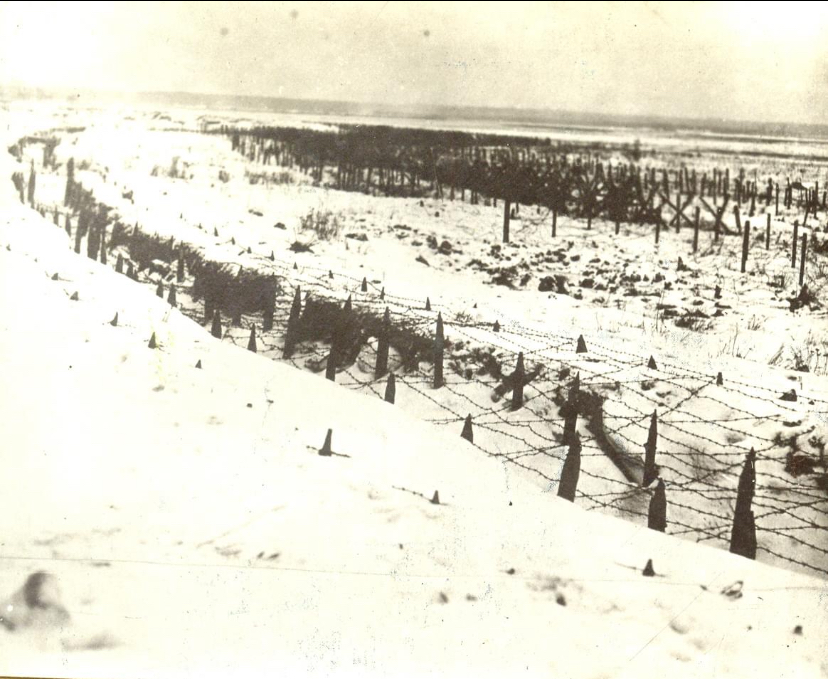
Christmas Battle Positions in Tīrelis Swamp

After the failure of the 1916 campaigns in Romania, the commander of the Russian 12th Army received an order to attack on the Riga front. The objective was to attract the German reserve forces, thus helping their allies to resist on the Verdun battlefield. In mid-December 1916 there was a deep drop in temperature with a heavy frost, making it possible to move through the now frozen bog and gain access to the German fortifications. It was quickly decided to launch an attack at Christmas. The main objective being to the capture of Jelgava (Mitau).

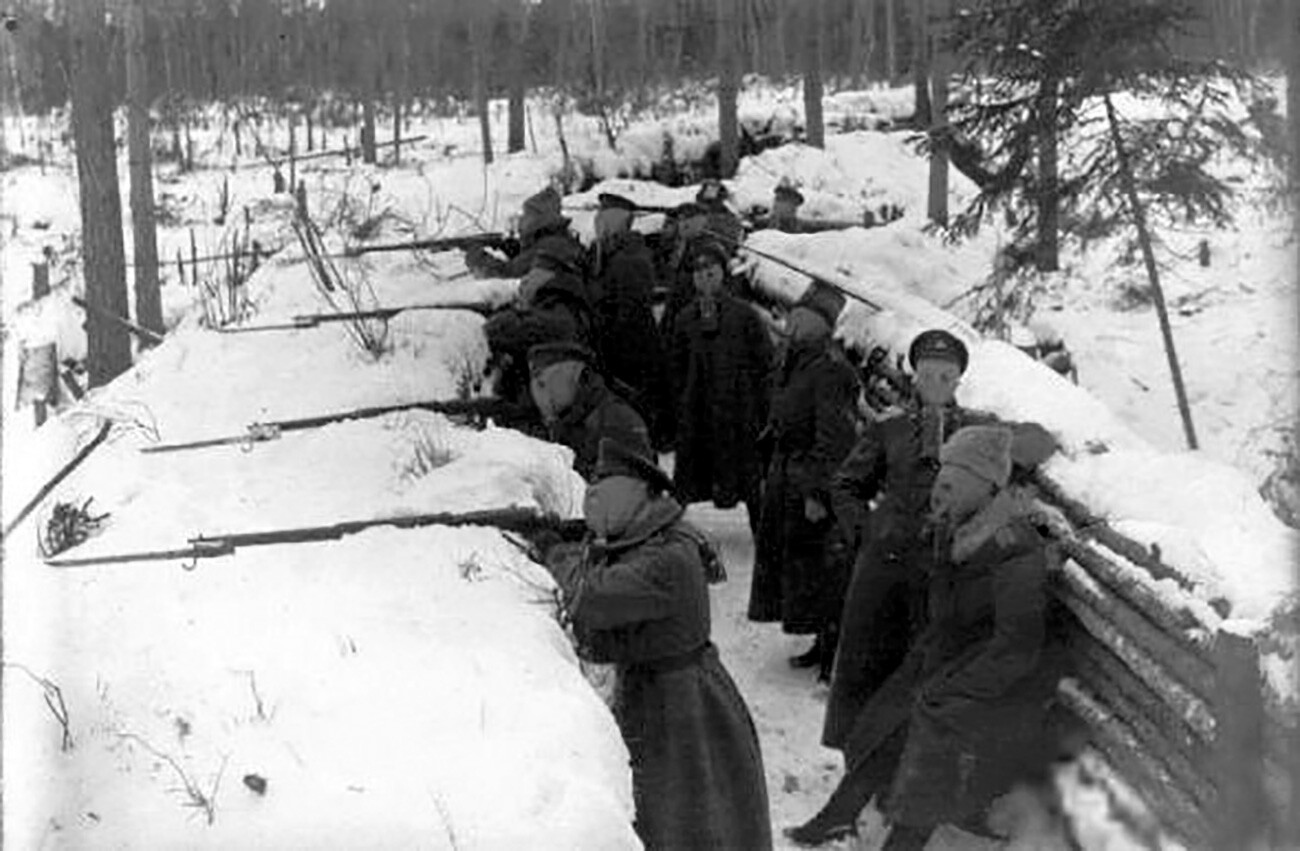
Latvian riflemen in the trenches during Christmas Battles

The attack began early morning 23 December (5 January) and surprised the Germans, who expected that Russian troops would be celebrating Christmas. The Latvian Riflemen were the advance guard in the attack, their main task being to capture the first German lines and clear the way for the main force following behind them. Wearing white winter camouflage uniforms and using the cover of a heavy snowstorm, the Latvians cut passages through the German barbed wire barriers. After this was done, the main forces of the two Latvian Riflemen brigades advanced through the breached wire using the element of surprise without any artillery support to prevent giving the German garrison forces an advanced warning of the ongoing operation. After successfully crossing the German Wall they captured the first German battle line after a brief skirmish. Many of the soldiers could not make it to the wall and did not have a way to retreat without the Germans spotting them, thus these units chose to die from frostbite (whilst not moving) over betraying their fellow Latvian brothers.

The battle continued over the next two days with varying success, as all the Latvian units became involved in heavy fighting within the breached position and the German defence stiffened as it received reinforcements from Jelgava. In further fighting the German second defence line at Mangaļi homestead fell to the assaulting forces. At this point the attack was stopped as the Russian Commander-in-Chief had no reinforcements on hand to put into the action apart from 17th Siberian Regiment, which refused to go to battle, this mutiny was supported by several other units from the 2nd and 6th Siberian Army Corps, and an augury of things to come in the Russian Revolution. Whilst the mutiny by the Siberian units on the field caused a halt in the Russian battle-plan, the Germans were receiving substantial troop reinforcement from Jelgava, and quickly launched a counter-attack upon the Russian and Latvian positions in their breached defences. Fighting in a mid-winter temperature of -35°C, the Latvian Riflemen units held back German attacks for two days.

On 25 December (7 January) Russian troops launched an attack on heavily fortified sand dunes on the northern side of Tīreļpurvs. A central part of those fortifications was a fortified hill, which later was named Ložmetējkalns ("Machine-gun Hill"). On Christmas morning, the 3rd and 7th Latvian Riflemen Regiments, together with the 53rd Siberian Regiment, after suffering heavy losses, partially surrounded the German forces. The 2nd Latvian Rifleman Brigade attacked the position from the rear and thus finally broke the German resistance on Machine-gun Hill. Many German soldiers managed to retreat, around 1000 being taken prisoners. It was the biggest victory by the Russian forces on the Riga Front and the German Army lost one of its strongest fortifications. Overall, a more than 7 kilometre wide gap was made in the German lines. However, the commander of the Russian 12th Army was not in a position to exploit the opportunity and organize a pursuit because he had not anticipated the Latvian Rifle Brigade's victory.

== January battles: German counterattack ==
After their partial defeat in the Christmas battles, the German 8th Army organized a counterattack to capture lost positions. The Germans received strong reinforcements and many fresh divisions were stationed in Jelgava. On the early morning of 23 January a massive artillery barrage started, soon followed by an infantry attack along the whole battle line. The main German forces consisted of the 1st Reserve Division (1. Reserve-Division) and 2nd Infantry Division (2. Infanterie-Division). They attacked across Tīrelis Swamp against the Latvian and Russian positions. The Latvian Riflemen and the Siberian regiments desperately defended their positions for three days. The Russians attempted to launch three counterattacks, but all failed. In one of those counterattacks, the Latvian Riflemen were forced to attack across an open field against German machine guns and thus suffered heavy losses (especially the 3rd Kurzeme Regiment). The temperature dropped to -38°C rendering it impossible for either side to continue active warfare. The Germans managed to regain 80% of their lost positions, although 'Machine-gun Hill' stayed in Russian hands.

== Aftermath ==
This operation cost the Latvian riflemen and Russians bloody losses. However, they partially fulfilled their goal, the Russians tested a new breakthrough tactic, which proved successful, and they were also able to pull back part of the German forces from the Romanian front, which helped the latter avoid defeat. However, the 12th Army's command punished the Siberian Riflemen, some of whom refused to go into battle – 92 of them were brought before the war tribunal and sentenced to death, and several hundred were sent back to Siberia.

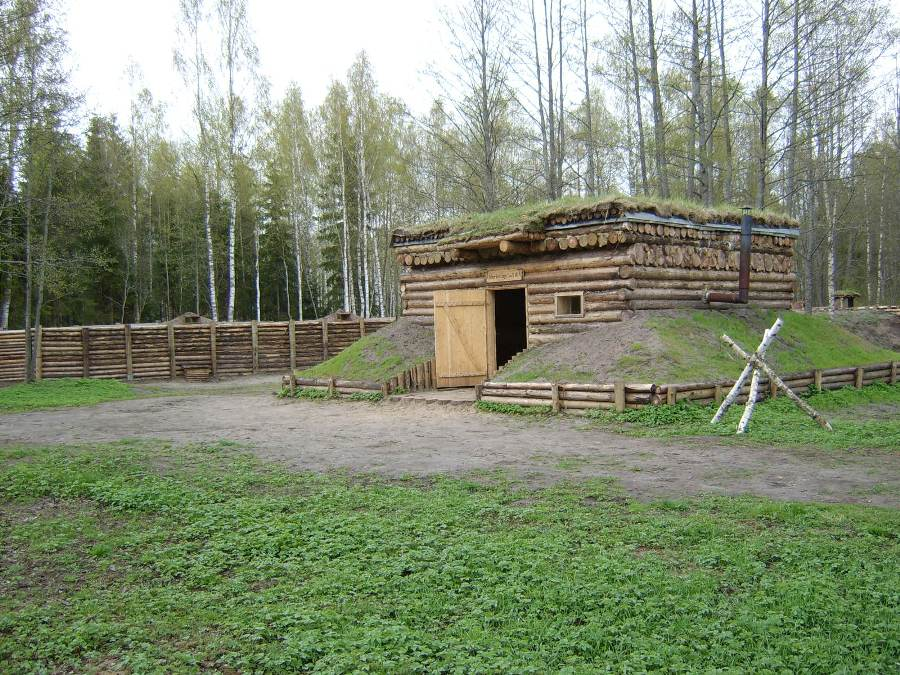
Reconstructed fragment of the German Wall and bunker in the Museum of the Christmas Battles. (2009)

Today Tīrelis Swamp and the nearby forests are part of the Museum of the Christmas Battles which in its turn is a branch of Latvian War Museum. The museum was created to honour Latvian riflemen and other soldiers who fought on the Riga Front during the First World War. Many of the old trenches are still visible in this area today, complemented by reconstructed fortifications and bunkers.

== Bibliography ==
- Information of the Christmas Battles (in German).
- Илья Максимов. Военно-исторический атлас России. IX - XX века. ДРОФА, Дом интеллектуальной книги, 2006 г. (in Russian)
- History of the Latvian Riflemen
- Chronology of the Christmas Battles (In English)
- Oleynikov, Alexei (2016). Россия-щит Антанты [Russia-Shield of Entente]. Foreword by Nikolai Starikov. St.Petersburg: Piter. ISBN 978-5-496-01795-4.
- Oldenburg, Sergey (2022). Царствование императора Николая 2 [The Reign of Emperor Nicholas 2] (in Russian). Moscow: центрополиграф. ISBN 978-5-227-09905-1.
