= Ludvigs Bolšteins =

Latvian general

- Born: February 5, 1888; Sesava parish, Russian Empire
- Died: June 21, 1940 (aged 52); Rīga, Latvia
- Burial place: Brothers' Cemetery
- Military career
- Allegiance: Russian Empire; White movement Latvia
- Branch: Army
- Service years: 1912 – 1913 and 1914 – 1917; 1917 – 1918; 1918 – 1920 and 1925 – 1940
- Rank: General
- Wars: World War I; Russian Civil War; Latvian War of Independence
- Awards: Order of Saint Stanislaus (III class (with lances)), Order of St. Anna (III and IV (with lances) classes), Order of Lāčplēsis (II, III classes), Order of the Three Stars (II, III classes), Latvian Aizsargi Cross of Merit, Legion of Honour, Order of the Cross of the Eagle (II class), Order of the Lithuanian Grand Duke Gediminas (II class), Order of the White Rose of Finland (I class), Finland Suojeluskunta Cross of Merit, Poland Cross of Merit (gold), Order of Polonia Restituta (III class)

Ludvigs Bolšteins (February 5, 1888 – June 21, 1940) was a Latvian general. From 1925 to 1928 Bolšteins was commander of the Aizsargi home guard, from 1928 to 1940 commander of the Latvian border guard. He killed himself following the Soviet occupation of Latvia.

== Biography ==
Ludvigs Bolšteins was born on February 5, 1888, in Sesavas parish. In 1907 Bolšteins graduated from St. Petersburg University, where he studied in the physics-mathematics faculty. In 1912 he joined the Russian army, and was decommissioned at the end of 1913.

When the World War I broke out, he was mobilised and initially he served in Daugavgrīvas fortress, later assisting in the formation of Latvian riflemen battalions. He served in the 1st Daugavgrīva Latvian Riflemen battalion, later regiment, where he started his service as praporshchik, but by the end of his service in the Russian army he had risen to the rank of stabskapitan. During World War I was awarded Order of St. Stanislaus (III class (with lances)) and Order of St. Anna (III and IV (with lances) classes).

After the Bolshevik rise to power, he was arrested in Cēsis in November 1917, but managed to escape. Subsequently, he travelled to Moscow, where in Spring 1918 he along with those who refused to join the Red Army, like his former commander Frīdrihs Briedis, took part in Savinkov's Union for the Defense of the Motherland and Freedom.

After the collapse of SZRS following the Yaroslavl and Rybinsk Uprisings Bolšteins returned to Latvia on December 28, 1918. There he joined Latvian army. Initially he aided the formation of new units in Liepāja, and would later also serve at the front lines as a member of Kalpaks battalion. On July 12, 1919 Bolšteins obtained the rank of lieutenant colonel. On August 9 he was appointed the commander of the 9th Rēzekne Infantry Regiment. After the liberation of Rīga he was promoted to colonel. For duration of the Latvian War of Independence he served on the Latgale front.

After being demobilized on September 15, 1920, Bolšteins took to farming at his estate in Līvbērze parish. In 1925 he became the head of the Aizsargi home guard, and in 1928 became the commander of the Latvian Border guards. In 1935 he received the rank of general. During his service in the Latvian army he was awarded the Order of Lāčplēsis (II, III classes), Order of the Three Stars (II, III classes) and other Latvian and foreign decorations. After the occupation of Latvia by the USSR, he killed himself in his office. Ludvigs Bolšteins was buried at the Brothers' Cemetery.

Before taking his life, Bolšteins left a suicide note directed to his superiors. In his letter he wrote:

To my superiors.

We, the Latvians, built ourselves a brand new house — our country.
Now an alien power wants to force us to tear it down ourselves.
In this I cannot take part.

— Ludvigs Bolšteins, Death note to superiors.

== See also ==
- List of Latvian Army generals
