= Frīdrihs Briedis =

Latvian military personnel (1888–1918)

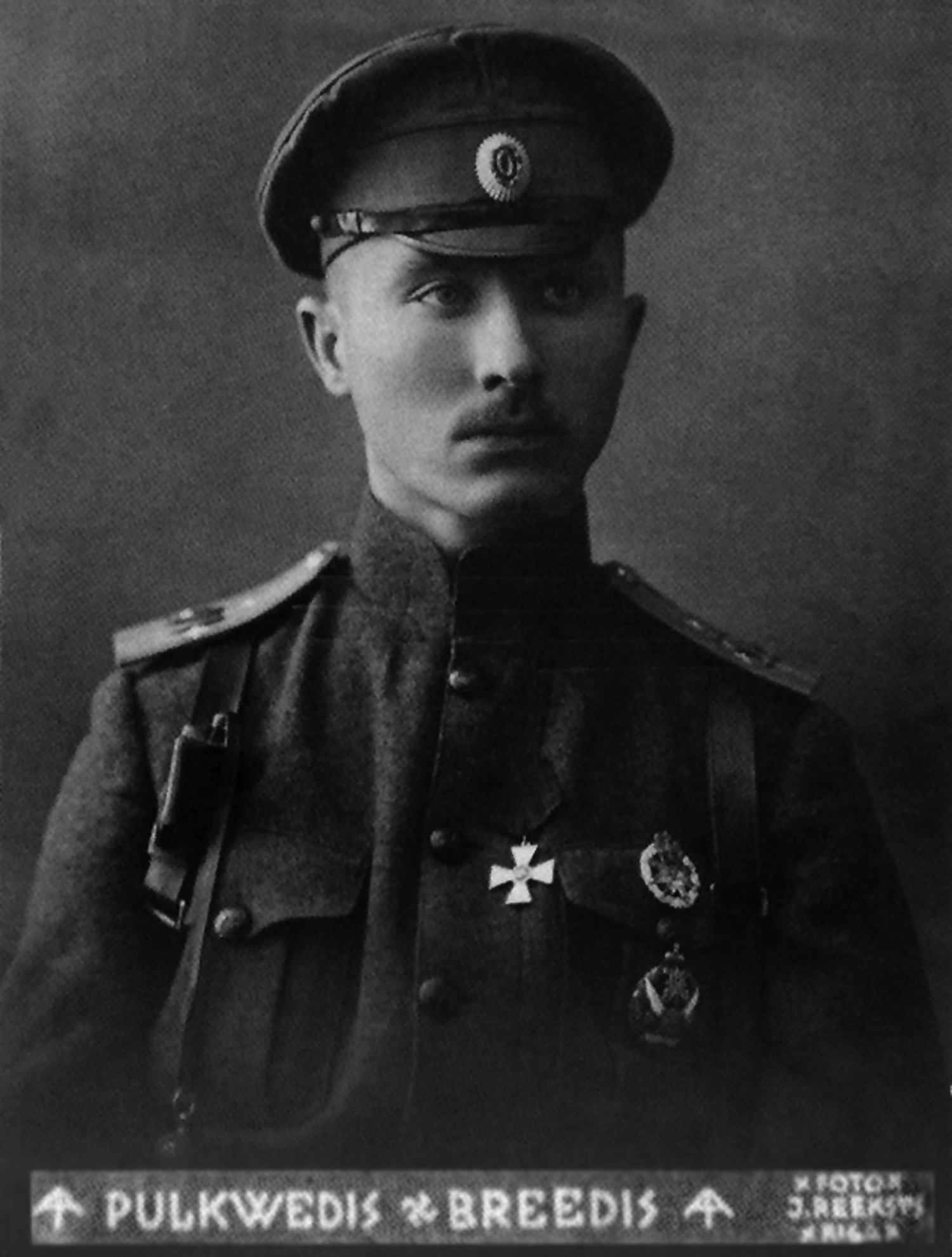
- Born: June 23, 1888; Klenoviki, Vitebsk Governorate, Russian Empire
- Died: August 28, 1918 (aged 30); Moscow, Soviet Russia
- Military career
- Allegiance: Russian Empire (Russia) White Movement
- Branch: Imperial Russian Army (Russia) White Army
- Service years: 1906–1918
- Rank: Colonel
- Conflicts: World War I Russian Civil War
- Awards: Order of Lāčplēsis (I, II, III classes); Cross of St. George; Sword of St. George; Order of St. Vladimir (IV class); Order of St. Anna (II, III and IV classes); Order of Saint Stanislaus (II and III classes)

Frīdrihs Briedis (June 23, 1888 – August 28, 1918) was a Latvian colonel and one of the most famous Latvian Riflemen commanders. He was posthumously the recipient of all classes of the Order of Lāčplēsis.

== Early life ==
To escape dishonest and harsh baronial treatment, Briedis' father moved the family from Vidzeme to Vitebsk Governorate (today's Shumilina Raion in Belarus), where he obtained forest land, cleared it for growing corn, and built the house where Briedis was born, the youngest of three children.

Briedis' upbringing, particularly his mother's influence, engendered in him a devout nature. He graduated with distinction from the local rural district (pagasts) and local congregational church schools.

He left his family home in 1902, traveling to Daugavpils, where he moved in with relatives and entered the six-year city school. A consistently excellent student, he devoted his spare time furthering his religious studies, tutoring to buy books, hoping one day to become a minister—his goal to battle the moral decay which deeply affected him at the time of the Russo-Japanese War. By his own admission, he had time for few, if any, friends.

Finished with school, Briedis determined to enter the Monastery at Belye Berega. Having arrived at the rail station, nearly at his destination, he encountered two inebriated monks. A shocked Briedis renounced any thought of entering the priesthood—he held boozing to be the most vile immorality and would have no truck with any who engaged in it. To fill the void, in 1905, Briedis found a new calling—the military.

== Military service ==
=== Russian Army units ===
In 1906 he was accepted into the St.Petersburg's Vladimir War School. Due to his excellent tactical knowledge he reached the rank of Senior sergeant by his last year at the school. Briedis graduated from the war school with the rank of Podporuchik, and afterwards he served in the 99th Ivangorod infantry regiment, which was deployed in Daugavpils. In 1912 he attained the rank of Poruchik and was appointed the company's Commander.

He participated in World War I, initially serving in East Prussia, where he successfully led reconnaissance patrols and received numerous awards for valor for his accomplishments, including the Order of St. George, the highest military order of the Russian Empire.

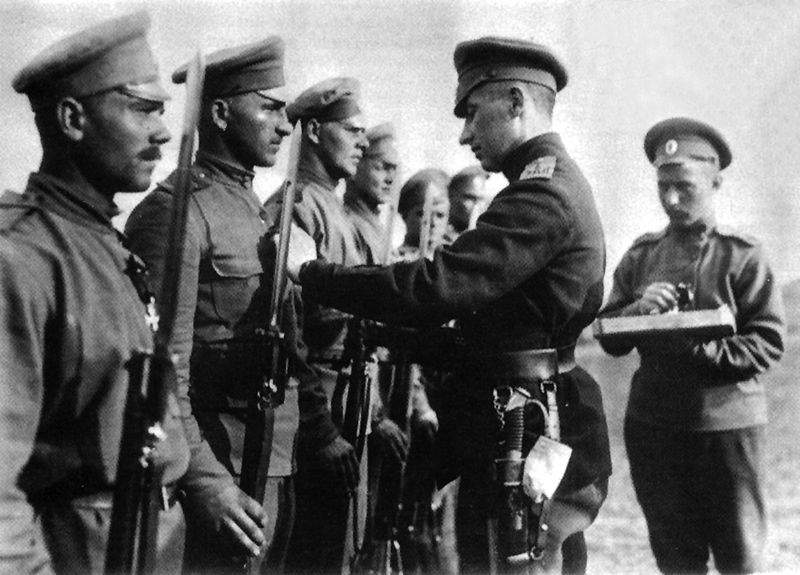
Fridrihs Briedis presents awards to his soldiers. (1916)

=== Latvian Riflemen ===
When the formation of the Latvian Riflemen battalions begun in August 1915 he returned to Latvia where was offered the command of the 2nd Riga Latvian Riflemen Battalion, which he declined and instead accepted the command of the 1st Company of the 1st Daugavgrīva Latvian Riflemen Battalion. He and his company participated in battles near the Misa River in October and November 1915. He distinguished himself by becoming the first Latvian Riflemen commander to engage with the enemy forces and quickly became famous across the demoralized Latvian community.

In March 1916 Briedis was severely wounded in the jaw during the First Battle of Ķekava, but he recovered and following the transformation of the Latvian Riflemen battalions into regiments in November 1916, he was promoted to command the 1st Battalion in the 1st Daugavgrīva Latvian Riflemen Regiment. He helped develop the tactical plans for the upcoming Mitau Operation, better known as the Christmas Battles, and thanks to his reconnaissance insights he was given the command of the 1st Latvian Riflemen Brigade's strike group. During the Christmas Battles, his units were the first to attack the enemy trenches in Tīreļpurvs, where he was wounded for a second time with an explosive shell.

=== During the Russian Revolution ===
Briedis was in hospital when the February Revolution broke out, triggering the collapse of the army. He was promoted to podpolkovnik and given command over the 1st Daugavgrīva Latvian Riflemen Regiment. With the Bolshevization and disintegration of the army, many riflemen began flocking to the Bolsheviks, but Briedis was one of the leading opponents against the Bolshevik agitation. Under his command the 1st Daugavgrīva Regiment was among the most resistant to Bolshevik propaganda in large part thanks to his active efforts to combat it, earning him the scorn from the Latvian Bolsheviks. Briedis formed a shock company in his regiment, made up of the most disciplined and anti-Bolshevik riflemen, and attempted to promote the creation of similar units in all Latvian Riflemen regiments, which was unsuccessful.

In August 1917, he alongside other senior Latvian Riflemen commanders and nationalist officers organized the formation of the National Union of Latvian Soldiers (LKNS), which would lay the groundwork for the military units of the Latvian Republic in 1918. Briedis was also one of the most politically active Latvian Riflemen commanders, joining the Latvian National-Democrat Party (LNDP), which consisted of the most nationalist Latvian public figures at the time, such as Ernests Blanks, Jānis Akuraters, Viktors Eglītis and others. In late August, he was promoted to polkovnik and elected to the Riga City Council as an LNDP deputy.

Following the Fall of Riga and the Kornilov Affair in September, Briedis travelled to Yuryev to treat his still unhealed injuries from the Christmas Battles. During the October Revolution, he returned to his regiment where the Bolsheviks removed him from command. He was briefly held under arrest before fleeing to Vitebsk where he formed a Latvian nationalist officers' group from anti-Bolshevik Latvian soldiers loyal to him. In January 1918 he sent several of them to participate in the defense of the All-Russian Constituent Assembly, while taking the rest with him to Moscow. He established an intelligence network in the city, maintained ties with the Volunteer Army, embedded officers into the Cheka and other Soviet institutions and met with representatives of disparate clandestine anti-Bolshevik organizations.

== During the Russian Civil War ==
In March 1918 Briedis joined Boris Savinkov's Union for the Defence of the Motherland and Freedom (SZRS), serving as its chief of intelligence and counterintelligence. Using funds from Savinkov, he organized desertion of the Latvian Riflemen from the Red Army through the LKNS' Moscow Chapter and gathered intelligence on the German units in Russia, the Baltic and Ukraine. He also maintained close contact with the LNDP and the Latvian National Council. He helped plan the Yaroslavl and Rybinsk Uprisings, directly participating in the latter in July 1918.

After the destruction of the SZRS, Briedis returned to Moscow to try to resume anti-Bolshevik activities. On July 23, 1918, he was arrested by the Cheka, and was held in the Butyrka Prison before being transported to Lubyanka. There were several attempts to liberate him, including a planned attack on the Butyrka Prison by his closest allies and even a direct intervention from the commander of the Soviet Latvian Riflemen Division and Commander-in-Chief of the Eastern Front, Jukums Vācietis. Ultimately none of the attempts to rescue Briedis succeeded.

On August 27, 1918, he was executed in Moscow by firing squad on the direct orders of the deputy head of the Cheka, Jēkabs Peterss.

== Legacy ==
Following his murder, Briedis became a martyr and one of the most mythologized Latvian officers of all time, alongside Oskars Kalpaks.

He posthumously received all classes of the Order of Lāčplēsis (LKo) for his valor in the Christmas Battles, and for participation in almost all the rifleman's operations on the Riga front. He is also the only Latvian officer to be awarded all classes of the LKo for the Latvian Riflemen battles. In Riga and other Latvian cities there are streets named in his honor. On the Frīdrihs Briedis Street in Riga there is also a statue dedicated to him.

=== References in popular culture ===
Latvian pagan metal band Skyforger has a song Pulkvedis Briedis (Colonel Briedis) dedicated to Frīdrihs Briedis. It is included in the Latvian rifleman album.
