= Rybinsk Uprising =

- Part of the Russian Civil War
Date	Night – Noon on July 8, 1918
Location	Rybinsk and surroundings
Result	Bolshevik victory; Uprising suppressed; One of the detachments takes up partisan activities to help the Yaroslavl Uprising; Red Terror's intensity increases in Rybinsk

Belligerents
Russian Socialist Federative Soviet Republic	Union for the Defense of the Motherland and Freedom

Commanders and leaders
Unknown	Boris Savinkov; Frīdrihs Briedis

Units involved
Rybinsk Uyezd Extraordinary Commission; Workers' and Peasants' Red Army; Militia 1 cannon, machine guns and small arms	6 squads Less forces than those of the Bolsheviks; armament – small arms

The Rybinsk Uprising was a White Guard uprising in Rybinsk on July 8, 1918, carried out by Boris Savinkov's anti–Bolshevik organization «Union for the Defense of the Motherland and Freedom» created in March 1918 with the approval of the command of the Volunteer Army in the person of generals Lavr Kornilov and Mikhail Alekseev.

== Preconditions of the uprising ==
By July 1918, the Bolshevik government had lost a significant part of the territory of Russia and actually controlled only its central part, including Moscow and Petrograd. Under these conditions, according to Boris Savinkov's plan, the "Union for the Defense of the Motherland and Freedom" was supposed to raise an uprising in the central regions and then defeat the Bolsheviks with the help of the Entente's intervention. The main force of the rebels was to be regular officers of the tsarist army, as well as local residents, workers, peasants, members of the banned Menshevik, constitutional democrats parties, and so on, dissatisfied with the actions of the Bolsheviks.

Three cities were chosen to prepare the uprising: Yaroslavl, Rybinsk and Murom. At the same time, it was Rybinsk that Savinkov considered as a priority target: there were located ammunition depots of the 6th Red Army that was being formed. The city also had one of the largest organizations of the Union after Moscow: there were about 400 of its members. Savinkov hoped that the uprising in Yaroslavl (started on July 6, 1918) would draw back the forces of the "Reds" from Rybinsk, allow him to take control of the ammunition and then come to the aid of Yaroslavl. The operation was supervised by Savinkov himself, as well as by Alexander Dikgof-Derenthal, his closest assistant, and Frīdrihs Briedis, SZRS' chief of intelligence and counterintelligence. The beginning of the uprising was scheduled for the morning of July 8. The rebel forces were divided into six groups of about 70 people each.

== Course of the uprising ==
The Rybinsk Uyezd Extraordinary Commission somehow managed to learn about the preparations for the uprising. The gathering places of five detachments of the "Union" were blocked by the Workers' and Peasants' Red Army, employees of the All–Russian Extraordinary Commission and the militia. As a result, only a detachment under the command of Savinkov himself could begin to operate. At about 3:00, he was able to occupy the Myrka Military Barracks in the west of the city (now at the intersection of Svoboda and Herzen Streets) without resistance and seize the machine guns and rifles stored in them. Then his detachment occupied the building of the former commercial school (now the Aviation College), but the way to the artillery depots of the rebels was blocked by Latvian riflemen. Savinkov's detachment was forced to retreat to the station, after which he was able to leave the city, abandoning machine guns and rifles. It was not possible to notify the leaders of the Yaroslavl Uprising about the failure in Rybinsk: the officer sent with the message was captured. For some time, Savinkov's detachment was engaged in sabotage on the railway in order to interfere with the supply of the troops besieging Yaroslavl, but then disintegrated.

The arrested rebels were shot. An indemnity of 5 million rubles was imposed on the bourgeoisie of Rybinsk.

The failure of the performance in Rybinsk became the reason for the failure of the uprisings both in Yaroslavl (it was suppressed on July 21) and in Murom (there the White Guards held out after the uprising on the evening of July 8 for about a day).

== See also ==
- Bibliography of the Russian Revolution and Civil War
- Outline of the Russian Revolution and Civil War
- Index of articles related to the Russian Revolution and Civil War
- The "Russian" Civil Wars, 1916–1926: Ten Years That Shook the World
- Russia in Flames: War, Revolution, Civil War, 1914–1921
- Russia in Revolution: An Empire in Crisis, 1890 to 1928
- Russia: Revolution and Civil War, 1917—1921
- The Russian Revolution: A New History*Yaroslavl Uprising

== Sources ==
- The Red Book of the All–Russian Extraordinary Commission (In 2 Volumes) / Edited by Alexey Velidov. Book 1. 2nd Edition – Moscow: Publishing House of Political Literature of the Central Committee of the Communist Party of the Soviet Union, 1989
- Avenir Aleksashkin, Alexander Pushkarny. District Emergency Commissions / Yaroslavl Department of the Federal Security Service. Faithfully and Truly: Pages of History – Yaroslavl: Nuance, 2001
- 90 Years of the White Guard Uprising in Rybinsk // Rybinsk Week, No. 1 of July 14, 2008
