= Kārlis Goppers =

Latvian soldier and scouting pioneer

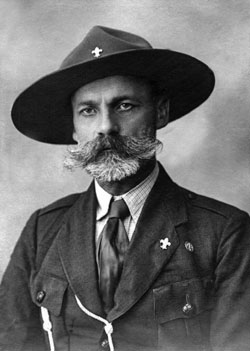
- Born: April 2, 1876; Plani volost, Livonia Governorate, Russian Empire (now Valmiera Municipality, Latvia)
- Died: March 25, 1941 (aged 64); Ulbroka, Latvian SSR, Soviet Union
- Military career
- Allegiance: (Russia) Russian Empire (Russia) White Army; Latvia
- Service years: 1893–1917 (Russian Empire); 1917–1920 (White Army); 1920–1934 (Latvia)
- Rank: Colonel (Imperial Russian Army); Major General (White Army); General (Latvia)
- Awards: Order of St. George 3rd and 4th classes, Order of St. Vladimir 3rd and 4th classes, Order of St. Anne 2nd and 3rd classes, Order of St. Stanislaus 2nd and 3rd classes, Military Order of Lāčplēsis 2nd and 3rd classes, Order of the Three Stars 2nd and 3rd classes

Kārlis Goppers (Russian: Карл Иванович Гоппер; April 2, 1876 – March 25, 1941) was a Russian and Latvian military officer, veteran of World War I and the Russian Civil War and the founder and President of Latvijas Skautu un Gaidu Centrālā Organizācija (Latvian Scout and Guide Central Organization).

== Background ==
Born to a Latvian peasant family in the Livonian Governorate of the Russian Empire, Goppers volunteered for the Imperial Russian Army in 1893. In 1894, after training, he was promoted to junior non-commissioned officer, and later that year was admitted to the Vilna military school, from which he graduated in 1896 as a podpraproshchik. By March 1916 he had risen to the rank of colonel, and served as the commander of the 7th Bauska riflemen regiment until February 1917. During World War I he was wounded three times. in October 1917, still under the Russian Provisional Government, he was promoted to the rank of major general, but due to the Bolshevik takeover he did not formally receive the promotion. During this period he actively opposed the new regime, participating in general Kornilov's march on Petrograd and being in touch with Boris Savinkov and his Union for the Defense of the Motherland and Freedom. He retired to the city of Syzran, where he received a summons to the city of Yaroslavl, where he obtained a commission in the newly formed Red Army as a former tsarist colonel. In June 1918, however, he was recognised by Semyon Nakhimson and fled his post, participating in the Yaroslavl Uprising. After the defeat of the latter Goppers joined the ranks of the People's Army of Komuch, and eventually was assigned to the headquarters of the forces aligned with the Directory in Ufa. In 1919 he received his delayed promotion to major general in the armed forces of the White movement.

After the end of the Civil War he commanded the Vidzeme division of the Latvian army, from 1924 to April 1934, when he retired. In 1939, he received Scouting's Silver Wolf Award from the movement's founder, Robert Baden-Powell, for his leadership in Latvia. After the Soviet occupation of Latvia, a special officer was appointed by the communists to abolish Scouting. Scouting continued unofficially and underground, operating without uniforms and in the forests to avoid detection. On 30 September 1940, the NKVD arrested General Goppers. He was sentenced to death after a show trial and on 25 March 1941, he was shot on NKVD premises 61 Brivibas Street, buried in the mass grave in Ulbroka (Stopiņi) together with other victims of the shooting. In May 1944, he was reburied in the Riga Brothers Cemetery, but his heart was buried in his native Trikata (Trikāta Cemetery).

== See also ==
- List of Latvian Army generals
