= Union for the Defense of the Motherland and Freedom =

Anti-Bolshevik underground organization during the Russian Civil War

- Союз защиты Родины и Свободы
- Leader: Boris Savinkov
- Dates active: March 1918 – July 1918
- Headquarters: Moscow, later Rybinsk and Yaroslavl
- Active regions: Elatma, Moscow, Rybinsk, Yaroslavl, Murom, Kazan and other cities
- Ideology: Anti-Bolshevism
- Political position: Big tent
- Size: c. 5,000

The Union for the Defense of the Motherland and Freedom (Russian: Союз защиты Родины и Свободы) was an underground anti-Bolshevik organization active during the early stages of the Russian Civil War. It was formally established in March 1918 under the leadership of Boris Savinkov, although the idea for the organization had emerged in late 1917.

Its creation was supported by elements of the Volunteer Army, including Generals Lavr Kornilov and Mikhail Alekseev.

The organization sought to coordinate anti-Bolshevik resistance and prepare armed uprisings in central Russia. It is best known for its role in organizing the Yaroslavl Uprising, the Rybinsk Uprising, the Murom Uprising, and the Elatma Uprising in 1918. Although it established branches in several Russian cities, it was largely destroyed following the suppression of these revolts.

A successor organization, the People's Union for the Defense of the Motherland and Freedom, was reconstituted in exile in 1921 and continued anti-Bolshevik underground activity until it was dismantled by the Soviet secret police in 1924. Savinkov himself was arrested in 1924 and died in OGPU custody in 1925.

== History ==
=== Formation ===
The concept of the Union for the Defense of the Motherland and Freedom emerged in late 1917 amid growing anti-Bolshevik resistance following the October Revolution. It was formally organized by Boris Savinkov in March 1918 as a clandestine network intended to coordinate anti-Bolshevik activity and prepare armed uprisings across central Russia.

The organization maintained contacts with anti-Bolshevik military circles, including representatives of the Volunteer Army, and reportedly received support from its command. Its political and military objective was the overthrow of Bolshevik power and the organization of resistance in the interior of Soviet-controlled territory.

Branches of the Union were established in Moscow, Rybinsk, Yaroslavl, Murom, Kazan, Elatma, and other cities.

=== 1918 uprisings ===
In mid-1918, the Union moved from underground organization to open insurrection. It played a central role in organizing a series of anti-Bolshevik uprisings, most notably in Yaroslavl, but also in Rybinsk, Murom, and Elatma.

These uprisings formed part of a broader effort to ignite coordinated resistance against the Bolshevik government. Additional revolts were reportedly planned in Moscow and Kazan, but arrests of members of the organization in May 1918 disrupted these plans before they could be carried out.

The uprisings were suppressed by Soviet forces, and the Union's operational structure inside Russia was effectively broken apart in the aftermath.

=== Reconstitution in exile ===
In January 1921, Russian émigrés meeting in Warsaw re-established the organization under the name People's Union for the Defense of the Motherland and Freedom. The reconstituted organization sought to continue anti-Bolshevik activity from abroad and to rebuild an underground network inside Soviet territory.

Between 1921 and 1923, the People's Union engaged in underground and subversive activities directed against the Bolshevik regime. Volunteers and operatives were sent into the Soviet Union in an effort to organize armed detachments, establish clandestine cells, recruit supporters, and attempt to provoke a broader anti-Bolshevik uprising.

=== Suppression ===
The Information Bureau of the People's Union published a regular bulletin, the Bulletin of the Information Bureau of the People's Union for the Defense of the Motherland and Freedom, which appeared approximately every ten days and usually ran to 6–8 pages. At least 22 issues are known to have been published, with No. 22, dated 17 November 1922, being the last known issue.

In early 1924, the main underground contingent of the People's Union operating within the Soviet Union was destroyed by the OGPU during Operation Syndicate–2. Savinkov, the leading figure associated with the organization, was arrested in August 1924 and later died in OGPU custody on 7 May 1925.

== Organization ==
The Union's leadership centered on Boris Savinkov, who directed its political and military activities and maintained contact with anti-Bolshevik allies and foreign representatives.

Among the organization's known personnel were:

- Boris Savinkov, leader of the organization
- Phlegont Klepikov, secretary and treasurer
- Colonel Alexander Perkhurov, chief of staff
- Colonel Karl Gopper, head of military personnel
- Colonel Stradetsky, liaison with the Volunteer Army
- Colonel Friedrich Briedis, responsible for intelligence, counterintelligence, and anti-Bolshevik propaganda among the Latvian Riflemen
- Doctor Aksanin (Nikolai Sergeyevich Grigoryev), head of the provincial and propaganda section
- Captain Alexander Vilenkin, head of the cavalry center
- Captain Schroeder, head of the artillery center
- Alexander Dikgof-Derenthal, who helped maintain contact with foreign missions
- Lyubov Dikgof, secretary to Savinkov

== Publications ==
The exile organization maintained a publication apparatus through the Bulletin of the Information Bureau of the People's Union for the Defense of the Motherland and Freedom, which circulated reports, political materials, and organizational information among émigré and underground anti-Bolshevik circles.

== See also ==
- Yaroslavl Uprising
- Rybinsk Uprising
- Murom Uprising
- Elatma Uprising
- Boris Savinkov
- White movement
- Russian Civil War
- Operation Syndicate–2

== Sources ==
- Bulletins of the Information Bureau of the People's Union for the Defense of the Motherland and Freedom
- Savinkov, Boris. The Fight Against the Bolsheviks // Russian Foreign Literature. Anthology in Six Volumes. Moscow: Kniga, 1990. Vol. 1, Book 2.
- The Union for the Defense of the Homeland and Freedom and the Yaroslavl Rebellion of 1918 // Proletarian Revolution, 1923, no. 10.
- Klementyev, V. F. In Bolshevik Moscow (1918–1920). Moscow: Russkiy Put, 1998.
- Korovin, V. V.; Rusanov, E. P. Boris Savinkov's Case // History of the Soviet Union, 1967, no. 6, pp. 143–155.
- Golinkov, D. L. The Collapse of the Enemy Underground. Moscow, 1971.
- Gopper, Karl. Four Collapses: Memoirs of General Gopper. Riga, 1920.
- Jekabsons, E.; Ščerbinskis, V. Participation of Latvians in White Military Forces During the Russian Civil War 1917–1920. Riga: Journal of the Latvian Institute of History, 1997.
- Shentalinsky, Vitaly. "His Among His Own. Savinkov in the Lubyanka." New World, no. 7 (1996).
