= List of Latvian Army generals =

This is a list of Latvian Army generals that served during Latvian independence (1918–1940 and 1991–onwards).

Latvian Army generals
Name	Born	Died	Notes
Eduards Aire	2 June 1876, Naukšēni parish	28 May 1933, Riga	promoted 1926
Jānis Apinis	12 January 1867, Drabeši parish	25 July 1925, Riga	promoted 1922
Žanis Bahs	6 October 1885, Sabile	16 October 1941, Moscow	promoted 1936
Jānis Balodis	20 February 1881, Trikāta parish	8 August 1965, Saulkrasti	promoted 1920
Krišjānis Berķis	26 April 1884, Īslīce parish	29 July 1942, Perm	promoted 1925
Ludvigs Bolšteins	5 February 1888, Sesava parish	21 June 1940, Riga	promoted 1935
Alberts Brambats	15 May 1881, Mujāni parish	1943, unknown	Surgeon General, promoted 1933
Andrejs Bubinduss	12 August 1891, Kuldīga	18 May 1942, Solikamsk	promoted 1940
Jānis Buivids	8 September 1864, Alkiškiai	2 April 1937, Jūrmala	promoted 1924 (retired 1928)
Hermanis Buks	15 January 1896, Ledurga parish	18 August 1942, Moscow	promoted 1939
Arturs Dālbergs	18 July 1896, Riga	26 October 1941, Moscow	promoted 1940
Roberts Dambītis	2 May 1881, Trikāta	27 March 1957, Trikāta	promoted 1935 (retired 1939)
Oskars Dankers	26 March 1883, Lielauce parish	11 April 1965, Grand Rapids	promoted 1925
Arturs Dannebergs	17 February 1891, Ķoņi parish	16 October 1941, Moscow	promoted 1935
Nikolajs Dūze	1 August 1891, Riga	14 December 1951, Riga	promoted 1936 (retired 1940)
Jānis Ezeriņš	17 November 1894, Prauliena parish	16 March 1944, Kotlas	promoted 1936
Kārlis Ezeriņš	10 September 1868, Bauska parish	29 September 1934, Riga	promoted 1916 (retired 1926)
Kārlis Goppers	2 April 1876, Plāņi parish	25 March 1941, Riga	promoted 1920 (retired 1934)
Oto Grosbarts	31 January 1895, Kūrmale parish	15 June 1945, Riga	promoted 1940
Mārtiņš Hartmanis	18 October 1882, Griķi parish	27 July 1941, Moscow	promoted 1929
Aleksandrs Kalējs	26 February 1876, Alūksne	14 February 1934, Riga	promoted 1927
Eduards Kalniņš	31 December 1876, Plātere parish	28 June 1964, Los Angeles	promoted 1925 (retired 1935)
Rūdolfs Klinsons	13 November 1889, Mālpils parish	16 October 1941, Moscow	promoted 1936
Roberts Kļaviņš	10 November 1885, Graši parish	16 October 1941, Moscow	promoted 1931 (retired 1934)
Ādams Kreicbergs	16 April 1861, Dzirciems parish	17 May 1933, Riga	promoted 1926
Andrejs Krustiņš	2 July 1884, Ungurmuiža parish	16 October 1941, Moscow	promoted 1925
Jānis Kurelis	6 May 1882, Ērģeme parish	5 December 1954, Chicago	promoted 1925 (retired 1940)
Arnolds Kurše	7 January 1896, Rucava parish	16 May 1953, Mariinsk	promoted 1940 (retired 1940)
Jānis Lavenieks	12 June 1890, Skrīveri	17 February 1969, New Brunswick, NJ	promoted 1939 (retired 1940)
Augusts Misiņš	21 December 1863, Annenieki parish	8 July 1940, Riga	promoted 1916 (retired 1920)
Kazimirs Olekšs	26 July 1886, Bērzpils parish	2 February 1970, Riga	promoted 1935 (retired 1936)
Mārtiņš Peniķis	6 November 1874, Turlava parish	28 February 1964, Riga	promoted 1920 (retired 1934)
Jānis Priede	16 August 1874, Vestiena parish	26 November 1969, Boston	promoted 1930 (retired 1931)
Pēteris Radziņš	2 May 1880, Lugaži parish	7 October 1930, Riga	promoted 1920
Hugo Rozenšteins	11 July 1892, Vecsalaca parish	30 July 1941, Moscow	promoted 1935 (retired 1940)
Jēkabs Ruškevics	9 February 1883, Jaunsvirlauka parish	29 August 1942, Solikamsk	promoted 1925 (retired 1938)
Dāvids Sīmansons	4 April 1859, Valmiera parish	13 January 1933, Riga	promoted 1915 (retired 1925)
Verners Tepfers	8 October 1893, Iecava	22 November 1958, Stockholm	promoted 1937
Fricis Virsaitis	14 November 1882, Bukaiši parish	24 May 1943, Vyatlag	promoted 1934 (retired 1940)

== Sources ==
Inta Pētersone (1999). Latvijas Brīvības cīņas 1918-1920 : enciklopēdija (in Latvian). Riga: Preses nams. ISBN 9984003957. OCLC 43426410.
