= Belye Berega =

Belye Berega (Russian: Бе́лые Берега́) is the name of several inhabited localities in Russia.

Urban localities

- Belye Berega, Bryansk Oblast, a work settlement under the administrative jurisdiction of Fokinsky City District of Bryansky Urban Administrative Okrug (city of oblast significance) in Bryansk Oblast; 53°13′N 34°40′E

Rural localities

- Belye Berega, Kursk Oblast, a village in Makaropetrovsky Selsoviet of Konyshyovsky District in Kursk Oblast
