= 1st Daugavgriva Latvian Rifle Regiment =

Regiment of the Latvian Riflemen (1916–1918)

- 1. Daugavgrīvas latviešu strēlnieku pulks
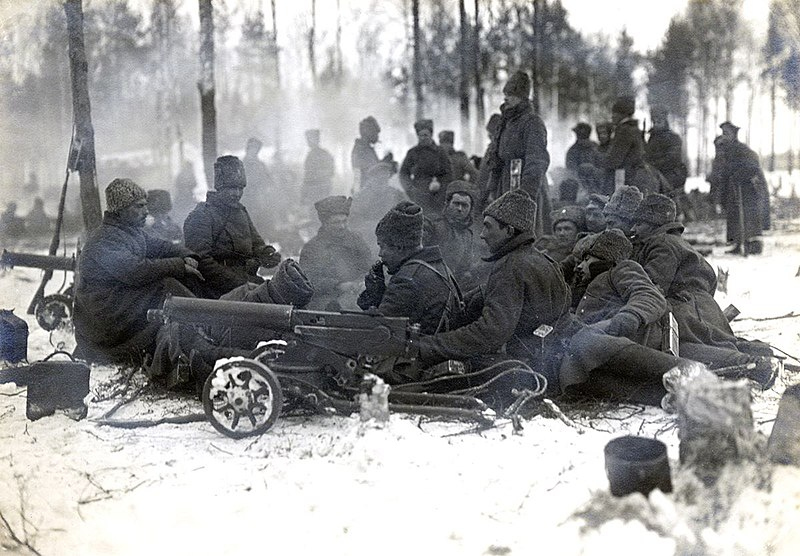
- Riflemen of the 1st Daugavgriva Rifle Regiment during the Christmas battles (January 1917)
- Active: 1916–1918
- Country: Russian Empire; Russian Republic (from 1917)
- Branch: Imperial Russian Army; Russian Army (from 1917)
- Size: Eight companies
- Engagements: World War I; Christmas Battles; Battle of Jugla

Commanders
- Notable commanders: Frīdrihs Briedis

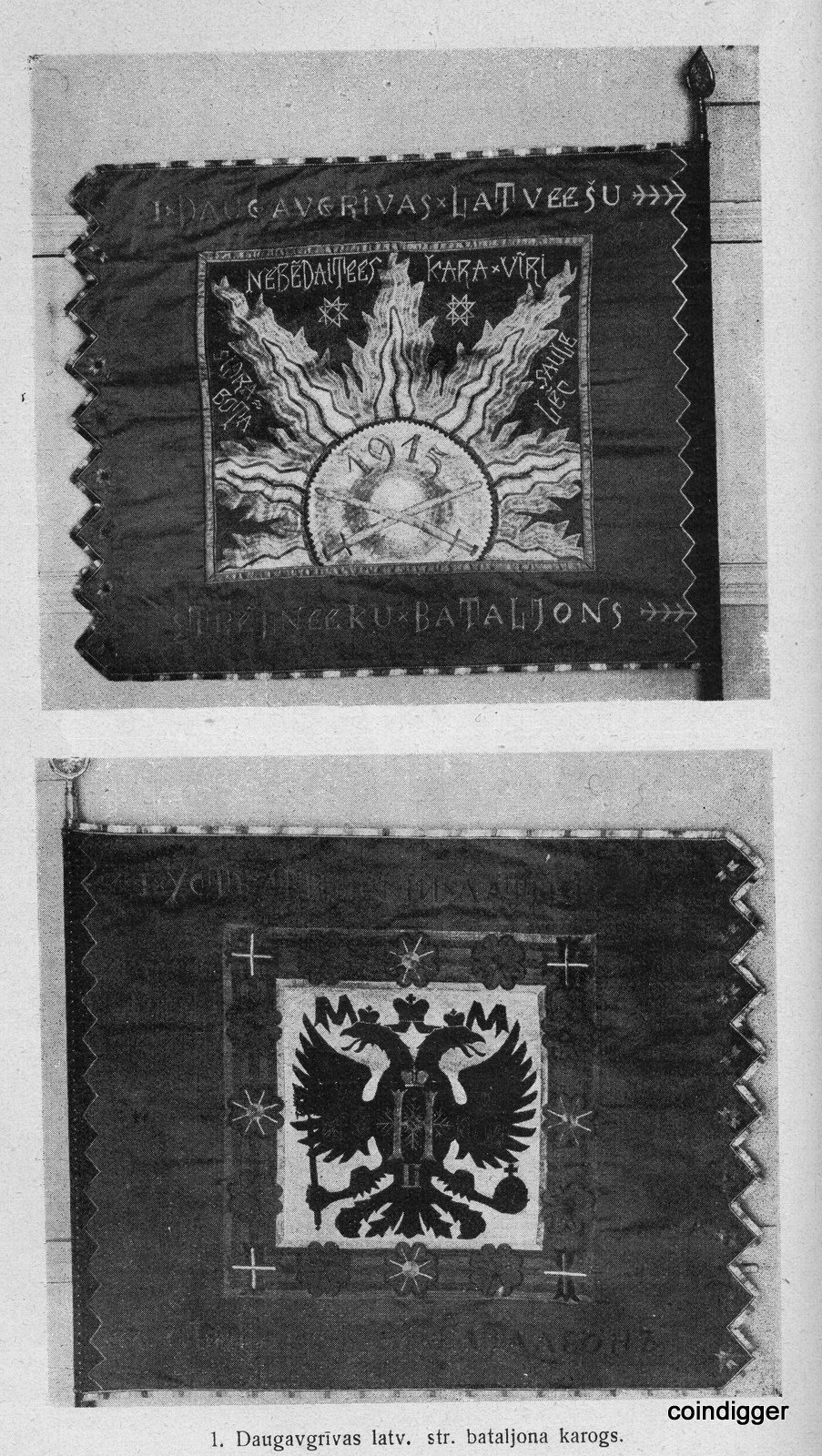
Flag of the 1st Daugavgriva Latvian Riflemen Battalion with the inscription "Don't worry, soldiers, the silver sun is rising" (1915).

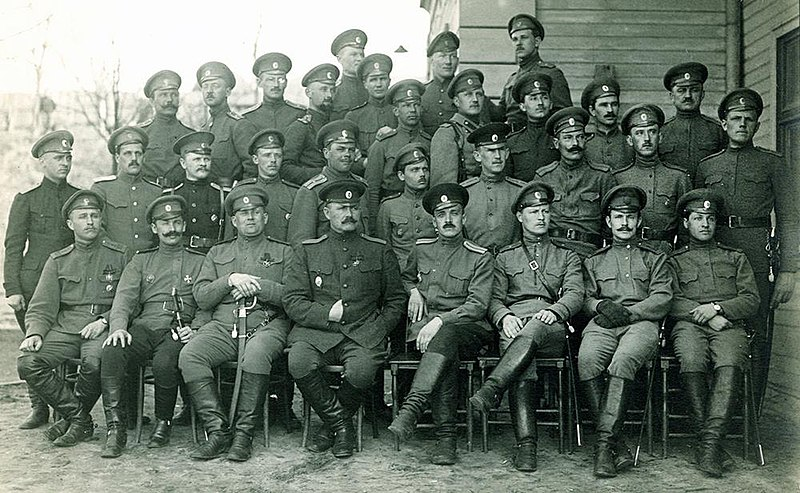
Officers of the 1st Daugavgriva Latvian Riflemen Battalion after the Battle of Ķekava in March 1916. In the front row: from left: Ensigns J. Menska, P. Darzans, Lieutenants P. Buriņš, Battalion Commander Captain Rudolfs Bangerskys, Doctor V. Gakhovichs, Ensigns V. Ezergailis, O. Jansons, A. Žid. In the second row: Ensign P. Luk, Doctor P. Kundzinš, Civil Servant A. Jaunbērz, Ensigns K. Maizitis, A. Praulinš, J. Vinelis, L. Bolšteins, E. Bullis, J. Kleinbergs, V. Amatnieks. In the third row: Warrant Officers T. Kalniņš, V. Bekmanis, V. Gailis, K. Šepko, J. Lutkar, J. Elmut, M. Austrinš, J. Šnuka, Silis, O. Evert. In the fourth row: Warrant Officers Briedis (I), N. Vildberg, Briedis (II).

The 1st Daugavgrīva Latvian Riflemen Regiment, also known as the 1st Latvian Ust-Dvina Riflemen Regiment (Latvian: 1. Daugavgrīvas latviešu strēlnieku pulks) was an infantry rifle military unit of the Imperial Russian Army. The regiment was an armed formation of the Latvian Riflemen as part of the 1st Latvian Rifle Brigade, which participated in World War I from 1915 to 1918. The regiment was formed from the 1st Daugavgrīva Latvian Riflemen Battalion on 3 November 1916. On 30 December 1917, the regiment was included in the Latvian Rifle Corps. On 6 April 1918, the regiment was demobilized according to terms of the Treaty of Brest-Litovsk.

== Creation of the battalion ==
During the Riga–Šiauliai offensive, the battalions of the Ust-Dvina Fortress successfully participated in the defence of Jelgava on 2 and 3 May 1915. This success cost the lives of 57 defenders of the fortress and wounded another 155 soldiers. On 16 August 1915, the 1st Ust-Dvina Latvian Riflemen Battalion was formed to defend Riga from volunteers who had not yet reached the draft age. The battalion's flag depicted a rising sun with crossed swords and the motto "Do not worry, soldiers, the silver sun is rising" (Latvian: Nebēdaities kara vīri, sidrabota saule lēc). Initially, each battalion composed of four companies and five teams: reconnaissance, machine gunners, mounted demolition specialists, communications, and supplies. The battalion's staff consisted of 26 officers, seven doctors and officials, and 1,246 non-commissioned officers and soldiers. It also possessed 164 horses, four machine guns and 47 carts. Each battalion formed its own combat orchestra. During the Ķekava battles in the summer of 1916, two more companies were created within the battalion.

== Formation of the regiment ==
In preparation for the Christmas Battles on 3 November 1916, the battalion was transformed into a regiment and integrated into the 1st Latvian Rifle Brigade. The regiment had eight companies and eight teams: machine gun, sapper, mounted reconnaissance, foot reconnaissance, communications, police, weapons accounting, and trench guns. The staff composed of: 50 officers, seven doctors and officials, 1,497 non-commissioned officers and soldiers, and eight volunteers. It also possessed 290 horses and 104 carts.

== Commanders ==
The regiment commanders were:

- Lieutenant Colonel Rudolf Bangersky (25 August 1915 – 18 November 1916)
- Colonel Georg Karlsons (18 November 1916 – 13 March 1917)
- Lieutenant Colonel Frīdrihs Briedis (from 13 March 1917)

== Participation ==
- In the fall of 1915, the 2nd and 3rd companies of the 1st Daugavgriva Latvian rifle battalion took part in the battle for the first time on October 25, 1915, near the Mangali farm on the Tireli swamp, and on October 28 the first fallen battalion riflemen were buried in the Forest Cemetery, where the foundation of the later Brothers' Cemetery was laid. In turn, on October 29, 1915, the 1st company under the leadership of F. Briedis attacked German positions in Plakanciems near the border of the Courland and Livonia Governorates near the Misa River and on 22 November at the Veisi farm.
- In March and July 1916, the 1st Daugavgriva Latvian Rifle Battalion took part in the battles near Kekava.
- The regiment participated in the Christmas Battles. On 5 January 1917 [O.S. 23 December] 1916, at 5 o'clock in the morning, the 1st Daugavgriva Latvian Rifle Regiment broke through the line of German fortifications and occupied the territory behind the Germans at a depth of about three kilometers. However, the attack stopped because no reserves were sent. On the evening of 5 January, as a result of several German counterattacks, it was not possible to hold the breakthrough site, and the rifle units were forced to retreat to their original positions.

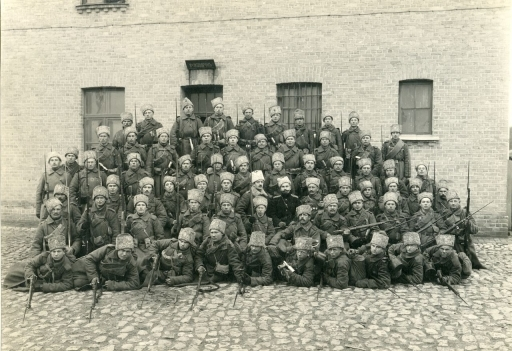
Company of the 1st Daugavgriva Latvian Rifle Battalion in October 1915.

== Dissolution ==
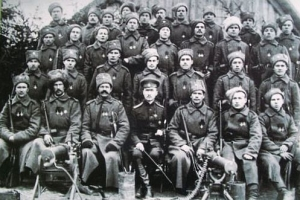
Soldiers with the awarded lieutenant of the 1st Ust-Dvinsk Latvian Rifle Battalion Frīdrihs Briedis after the latter received the Order of St. George in 1915.

After the October Revolution, and on 30 December 1917, the 1st Daugavgriva Latvian Rifle Regiment integrated into the newly formed Latvian Rifle Corps, commanded by Colonel Jukums Vācietis. The corps consisted of two divisions, commanded by Gustav Mangulis and Pyotr Aven. On 22 January 1918, the 1st and 6th battalions of the 1st Daugavgriva Latvian Rifle Regiment and the 1st battalion of the 4th Vidzeme Latvian Rifle Regiment went to Rogachev, where from 3 February to 13, the 1st Corps of Polish Legionnaires rose up in an uprising led by General Józef Dowbor-Muśnicki. According to terms of the Treaty of Brest-Litovsk, the Soviet government issued a demobilization order and create the Latvian Rifle Division as part of the Red Army.

== Decorated soldiers ==
- Frīdrihs Briedis: lieutenant (later captain) of the 1st Daugavgriva Latvian Rifle Regiment, later colonel, and regiment commander (from 13 March 1917). From 1 August 1915, he was commander of the 1st company. On 16 October 1915, he took part in the battles on the Misa River, and on 8 March 1916, he was seriously wounded in the battle near Kekava. On 23 December 1916, his battalion without artillery preparation, was the first to demolish German barbed wire barriers and, in a fierce battle, knocked the enemy out of their positions. He came under fire from a German heavy battery and was seriously wounded. He Awarded the Order of St. George, 4th Class, Saint George Sword, the Order of St. Vladimir, 4th Class, the Order of St. Anna, 4th, 3rd, and 2nd Classes, and the Order of St. Stanislav, 3rd, and 2nd Class. He was appointed regiment commander for heroism during the Christmas battles.

== Losses ==
- Sergeant Janis Akers (1896–1915): Killed on 9 November 1915 near the Plakany farmstead on the banks of the Misa River, near Olaine.
- Theodor Pirags (1893–1916), lieutenant of the 2nd company (posthumously), died on 15 March 1916 after being wounded in the battle near Kekava and was buried in the Riga Brotherhood Cemetery. Awarded the Order of St. Vladimir, 4th Class, and the Order of St. Anna, 4th Class.
- Janis Menska (1893–1917), warrant officer. Killed during the Christmas Battles on 5 January 1917.

=== Battle of the Misa River in 1915 ===
- Battle on October 25 near the Kraslovski farm on the eastern side of the Tirelsky swamp: four killed, five wounded, and three missing.
- Battle on October 29 near the village of Plakany on the right bank of the Misa River: four killed, 11 wounded.

November Battle of Olaine:

- From November 2 to 3 in the battle near the Mangali farm: 19 wounded, six missing.
- In the battle on 4 November at the Olaine swamp near the Kutnieki farm: 22 killed, 63 wounded, 19 missing.
- In the battle on 23 November near the Veisi farm on the left bank of the Misa River: two wounded.
- In the battle on 3 December near the Kutnieki farm near the Olaina swamp: one killed.
- From December 18 to 19 in the battle near the Katerinenhof farm near Kekava: three wounded.

=== Battle of Kekava in 1916 ===
- From March 12 to 13, battle near the Veisi farm: six wounded.
- In the battle on 13 March near the Krogzemya farm on the banks of the Misa River: eight killed, 26 wounded, four missing.
- In the battle on 21 March near the Franchi farm near Kekava: 134 killed and missing, 223 wounded.
- In the battles from July 16 to 22 near the Skata farm on the Kekava front: 106 killed, 569 wounded, 37 missing.

=== Christmas Battles in 1917 ===
- In the battle at the villages of Mangali and Skangali on January 5: 102 killed, 354 wounded, 25 missing.
- In the battle on 7 January near the Tirel swamp: eight killed, 60 wounded.
- In the battles from January 10 to 14 in the Tirel swamp: 4 killed, 38 wounded.
- In the battle of 25 January at the Irel swamp: 22 killed, 117 wounded, 12 missing.
- Battles from January 30 to 31 in the Tirel swamp: 99 killed, 140 wounded.

=== Battle of the Maza-Jugla River in 1917 ===
- Battles near Riga and the Shmiesing tavern from September 1 to 3: four wounded, 427 missing.
- In the Battle of Sigulda on September 10: one killed.
- In the battle of Sigulda on October 11: two killed, four wounded.
