= Eduards Kalniņš =

Latvian general

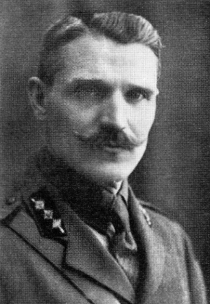
- Born: December 31, 1876; Plātere parish, Kreis Riga, Governorate of Livonia, Russian Empire
- Died: June 28, 1964 (aged 87); Hollywood, United States
- Military career
- Allegiance: Russian Empire; Latvia
- Branch: Army (artillery)
- Service years: 1894–1918; 1919–1935
- Rank: General (1925)
- Wars: Russo-Japanese War; Latvian War of Independence
- Awards: Order of Lāčplēsis (II and III class), Cross of Liberty (I/2) etc.
- Other work: Politician

Eduards Kalniņš (December 31, 1876 – June 28, 1964) was a Latvian general. He participated in the Russo-Japanese War and in the Latvian War of Independence. He was Minister of Defence of Latvia in 1926 and 1928 and was recipient of the Latvian military Order of Lāčplēsis, 2nd and 3rd class, and the Estonian Cross of Liberty.

== Biography ==
Born in Plātere Parish (now Ogre Municipality), Kreis Riga, in the Governorate of Livonia of the Russian Empire in a farmer's family. Graduated Plātere Elementary School and Riga City Catherine School.

In 1894 Kalniņš joined St. Peterburg's Artillery Academy, graduating in 1900. After graduation he was sent to the Kaunas artillery base. At the Michail Artillery Academy he passed an exam for the podporuchik rank. After that he served at the Novogeorgievsk fortress. In 1904 he was sent to Kwantung. He participated in the Russo-Japanese War and served at the Port Arthur naval base. During service Kalniņš was shell-shocked, wounded several times wounded and captured. In 1906 he returned from captivity and was sent to Krepost Sveaborg (near Helsinki), where he served until 1918.

On January 17, 1919, he voluntarily joined the Latvian Army. In February he was appointed as the North Latvian Brigade's artillery commander. He participated in battles against the Baltische Landeswehr units near Cēsis and Jugla. On July 15, 1919, Kalniņš was appointed commander of the Army Department of Artillery and the Commander-in-Chief headquarter's deputy commander. He was promoted to colonel. From July 18, 1919, to October 18, 1919, he was transferred to post of commander of main army's artillery department.

Kalniņš was a signer of the Latvian–Soviet Peace Treaty. In 1925 he was promoted to general. Between 1926 and 1928 he was Ministers of Defence of Latvia. From 1928 to 1935 he was an inspector of artillery. In 1935 Kalniņš retired from the army.

In 1944, before the Soviet Union occupied the country, he went to Sweden. In 1954 Kalniņš moved to Hollywood, where on June 28, 1965, he died.

== See also ==
- List of Latvian Army generals
