= Yelatma =

Yelatma Елатьма
- Urban-type settlement
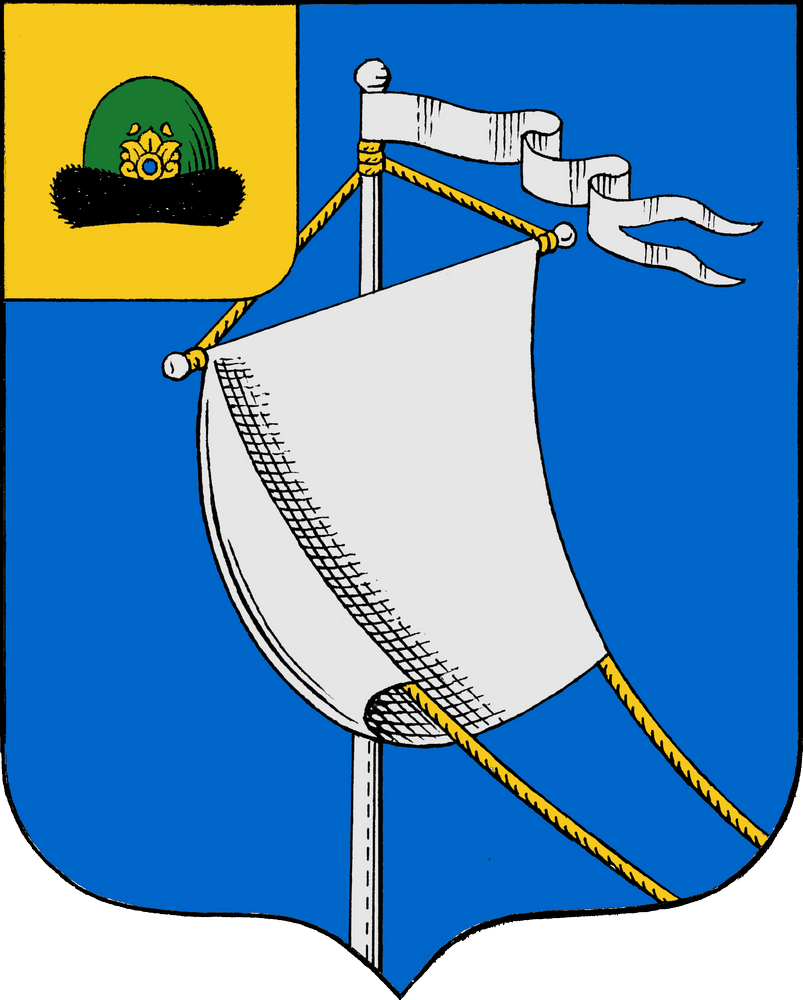
- Flag Coat of arms
- Interactive map of Yelatma
- Location of Yelatma Yelatma (Ryazan Oblast)
- Coordinates: 54.9693°N 41.7532°E
- Country: Russia
- Federal subject: Ryazan Oblast
- Administrative district: Kasimovsky District
- Elevation: 135 m (443 ft)

Population (2010 Census)
  - Total: 3,511
  - Estimate (2025): 3,119 (−11.2%)
- Time zone: UTC+3 (MSK)
- Postal code: 391351
- OKTMO ID: 61608156051

Yelatma (Russian: Елатьма) is an urban locality (an urban-type settlement) in Kasimovsky District of Ryazan Oblast, Russia. Population: 3,511 (2010 census); 4,002 (2002 census); 4,559 (1989 Soviet census).

== Climate ==
Elatma has a humid continental climate (Koppen Dfb).

Climate data for Elatma, Russia
Month	Jan	Feb	Mar	Apr	May	Jun	Jul	Aug	Sep	Oct	Nov	Dec	Year
Record high °C (°F)	7.0 (44.6)	7.6 (45.7)	18.5 (65.3)	26.6 (79.9)	34.2 (93.6)	36.6 (97.9)	38.3 (100.9)	39.3 (102.7)	31.5 (88.7)	24.2 (75.6)	18.7 (65.7)	8.5 (47.3)	39.3 (102.7)
Mean daily maximum °C (°F)	−5.4 (22.3)	−4.2 (24.4)	2.0 (35.6)	12.0 (53.6)	20.3 (68.5)	23.4 (74.1)	25.7 (78.3)	23.8 (74.8)	17.3 (63.1)	9.0 (48.2)	0.8 (33.4)	−3.7 (25.3)	10.1 (50.1)
Daily mean °C (°F)	−8.3 (17.1)	−7.8 (18.0)	−2.3 (27.9)	6.4 (43.5)	13.7 (56.7)	17.2 (63.0)	19.5 (67.1)	17.5 (63.5)	11.9 (53.4)	5.3 (41.5)	−1.6 (29.1)	−6.3 (20.7)	5.4 (41.8)
Mean daily minimum °C (°F)	−11.3 (11.7)	−11.2 (11.8)	−6.1 (21.0)	1.7 (35.1)	7.9 (46.2)	11.6 (52.9)	14.1 (57.4)	12.2 (54.0)	7.6 (45.7)	2.3 (36.1)	−3.8 (25.2)	−8.9 (16.0)	1.3 (34.4)
Record low °C (°F)	−42.9 (−45.2)	−39.0 (−38.2)	−31.6 (−24.9)	−21.0 (−5.8)	−5.1 (22.8)	−2.7 (27.1)	2.1 (35.8)	0.0 (32.0)	−7.7 (18.1)	−20.9 (−5.6)	−31.0 (−23.8)	−41.6 (−42.9)	−42.9 (−45.2)
Average precipitation mm (inches)	47 (1.9)	42 (1.7)	35 (1.4)	40 (1.6)	42 (1.7)	72 (2.8)	67 (2.6)	70 (2.8)	55 (2.2)	64 (2.5)	50 (2.0)	56 (2.2)	640 (25.4)
Average rainy days	6	5	8	12	14	17	16	15	17	16	11	7	144
Average snowy days	24	21	15	5	1	0	0	0	0.3	5	16	23	110.3
Average relative humidity (%)	85	81	77	69	64	72	74	76	79	83	87	86	78
Mean monthly sunshine hours	43.9	73.6	148.8	205.1	283.7	294.7	303.3	254.6	166.8	86.8	40.8	27.3	1,929.4
Mean daily daylight hours	8.6	10.4	12.5	14.8	17.0	18.2	17.5	15.6	13.3	11.1	9.1	8.0	13.0
Source 1: Pogoda.ru.net NOAA(humidity-sun)
Source 2: Weatherbase (daylight)
