= Belye Berega, Kursk Oblast =

Rural locality in Kursk Oblast, Russia

Belye Berega Белые Берега
- Village
- Interactive map of Belye Berega
- Location of Belye Berega Belye Berega (Kursk Oblast)
- Coordinates: 51°58′36″N 35°00′57″E
- Country: Russia
- Federal subject: Kursk Oblast
- Administrative district: Konyshyovsky District
- SelsovietSelsoviet: Naumovsky

Population (2010 Census)
  - Total: 4
  - Estimate (2010): 4 (0%)

Municipal status
  - Municipal district: Konyshyovsky Municipal District
  - Rural settlement: Naumovsky Selsoviet Rural Settlement
- Time zone: UTC+3 (MSK)
- Postal code: 307601
- Dialing code: +7 47156
- OKTMO ID: 38616432111
- Website: naumovsky.ru

Belye Berega (Russian: Белые Берега) is a rural locality (Russian: деревня, lit. 'village') in Naumovsky Selsoviet Rural Settlement, Konyshyovsky District, Kursk Oblast, Russia. Population: 4 (2010 census); 14 (2002 census);

== Geography ==
The village is located on the Svapa River (a right tributary of the Seym River), 44 km from the Russia–Ukraine border, 85 km north-west of Kursk, 24 km north-west of the district center – the urban-type settlement Konyshyovka, 11 km from the selsoviet center – Naumovka.

Climate

Belye Berega has a warm-summer humid continental climate (Dfb in the Köppen climate classification).

== Transport ==
Belye Berega is located 36 km from the federal route M-3 Ukraine Highway, 56 km from the route M-2 Crimea Highway, 16 km from the route A-142 (Trosna – M3 highway), 14 km from the road of regional importance 38K-038 (Fatezh – Dmitriyev), 23 km from the road 38K-005 (Konyshyovka – Zhigayevo – 38K-038), 2.5 km from the road 38K-003 (Dmitriyev – Beryoza – Menshikovo – Khomutovka), on the road of intermunicipal significance 38H-461 (Makaro-Petrovskoye – Belye Berega), 8.5 km from the nearest railway station Arbuzovo (railway lines Navlya – Lgov-Kiyevsky and Arbuzovo – Luzhki-Orlovskiye).

The rural locality is situated 91 km from Kursk Vostochny Airport, 182 km from Belgorod International Airport and 290 km from Voronezh Peter the Great Airport.
