= Yaroslavl Uprising =

1918 revolt of the Russian Civil War

- Part of Civil War in Russia
Date	July 6–21, 1918
Location	Yaroslavl and surroundings
Result	Rebellion suppressed; Beginning of the Red Terror in Yaroslavl

Belligerents
(Russian Soviet Federative Socialist Republic) Bolsheviks	(Russia) Union for the Defense of the Motherland and Freedom

Commanders and leaders
(Russian Soviet Federative Socialist Republic) Semyon Nakhimson (executed) (Russian Soviet Federative Socialist Republic) Mikhail Frunze (Russian Soviet Federative Socialist Republic) Anatoly Gekker (Russian Soviet Federative Socialist Republic) Yuri Guzarsky[ru] (Russian Soviet Federative Socialist Republic) Stefan Żbikowski	(Russia) Alexander Perkhurov[ru] (Russia) Karl Gopper (Russia) Peter Karpov[ru] (executed)

Strength
July 6, 1918: (Russian Soviet Federative Socialist Republic) About 1,000 bayonets and sabers At the end of the uprising: (Russian Soviet Federative Socialist Republic) Aircraft (Russian Soviet Federative Socialist Republic) Heavy artillery	July 6, 1918: (Russia) 105 soldiers with 12 revolvers At the end of the uprising: (Russia) 1735–2135 bayonets (Russia) 2 cannon armored cars (Russia) 15 machine guns (Russia) 2 guns (Russia) 1 armored train

Casualties and losses
Unknown	(Russia) About 600 killed (in battles)

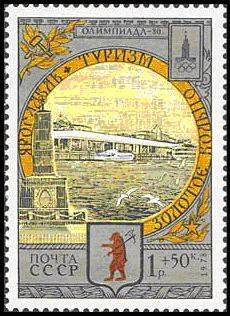
Monument to the victims of the White Guard rebellion on the stamp

The Yaroslavl Uprising (known in Soviet historiography as the Yaroslavl Rebellion) was an episode of the Civil War in Russia, an anti–Bolshevik protest by the townspeople and members of Boris Savinkov's organization in Yaroslavl on July 6–21, 1918. Suppressed by the forces of the Workers' and Peasants' Red Army. The uprising began untimely, since the Extraordinary Commission by that moment had begun arresting the Moscow branch of the Union for the Defense of the Motherland and Freedom. This inopportune and inability to coordinate with other anti–Bolshevik forces around the region of the uprising predetermined an unfortunate outcome. The lack of reinforcements and ammunition from the rebels also affected.

== Preconditions and organization of the uprising ==
Along with the Rybinsk Uprising and the Murom Uprising, the Yaroslavl Uprising was organized by the Union for the Defense of the Motherland and Freedom, created by Boris Savinkov with the approval of the command of the Volunteer Army in the person of Generals Lavr Kornilov and Mikhail Alekseev. The purpose of the Union for the Defense of the Motherland and Freedom was to organize resistance to Bolshevism in Central Russia. Carrying out the general leadership of the uprising in these cities, Boris Savinkov sent the chief of staff of the Union for the Defense of the Motherland and Freedom, Colonel Alexander Perkhurov, to Yaroslavl and instructed him to lead an armed uprising there.

The organizers of the uprising were the local branch of the Union for the Defense of the Motherland and Freedom. At the beginning of 1918, it was the most powerful anti–Soviet organization in Central Russia, with cells not only in Yaroslavl, but also in all large Upper Volga cities: Rybinsk, Murom, Kostroma. The presence of a well–branched underground network made it possible to create the core of the future resistance. The union interacted with local organizations of the Union of Officers, the Union of Front–line Soldiers and the Union of Saint George's Cavaliers, and also coordinated work with the anti–Soviet underground in Moscow, but due to the weakness of the latter and the growing activity of the All–Russian Extraordinary Commission, the main focus was on the provincial centers.

The choice of Yaroslavl as a stronghold for the uprising was due to a combination of several factors:

- It was a large provincial center on the Volga; the main railway to the North and Siberia ran here. Yaroslavl could be seen as the northern key to Moscow;
- After part of the local Red Guard units were sent to Moscow and the Kuban to assist in the fight against the White Movement, the number of organized and armed supporters of Soviet power in the city decreased;
- A tragic and naive belief in support of the Allies costing dearly to all white forces in the war. The rebels hoped for outside help, from anti–Soviet forces and organizations, as well as from the Entente countries (Boris Savinkov was given a promise to support the uprising by a French landing in Arkhangelsk, but in practice, the Entente landing force landed in Arkhangelsk only in August);
- Another factor that influenced the choice of Yaroslavl as a place of performance could be the deployment of the headquarters of the Yaroslavl Military District, which was engaged in the formation of Red Army units in the Northern Volga region, since March 1918. This allowed many officers to legally arrive in the city, and with the outbreak of the uprising, it immediately disorganized command and control over a vast territory;
- There is also a certain continuity of the July uprising in relation to the anti–Bolshevik resistance in Yaroslavl after October 1917. At the beginning of 1918, anti–Soviet demonstrations already took place in Yaroslavl, one of which took place on Easter days, but was quickly suppressed.

== Rebellion leaders ==
- The general leadership of the uprising and the actions of the armed formations was carried out by the monarchist, representative of the Volunteer Army, Colonel Alexander Perkhurov;
- A railway employee, a Menshevik Ivan Savinov (according to other sources, a member of the Rescue Committee Alexander Kizner) became an assistant to the chief in civil affairs;
- Vladimir Lopatin, a homeowner, engineer by profession, who held this post until July 1917, and then worked in the Yaroslavl City Duma as a vowel, was re–appointed to the post of mayor;
- The city council included the merchant Kayukov, the cadets Sobolev and Gorelov, as well as the former attorney at law Menshevik Meshkovsky;
- The leaders of the insurgents included a former member of the provincial executive committee, socialist–revolutionary Nikolai Mamyrin, who made trips to the villages and agitated the peasants for an uprising against Soviet power;
- Also, among the participants in the uprising was the former provincial commissar of the Provisional Government Boris Duchenne (who, however, did not hold any administrative posts).

== Rebellion goals ==
The goals of the rebels were the elimination of the Bolshevik dictatorship, the restoration of political and economic freedoms, the convocation of the Constituent Assembly, the rupture of the Brest–Litovsk Peace and, with the help of Russia's allies in the Entente, the opening of a new Eastern Front against Germany and the Bolsheviks. The right of ownership of the peasants to the land was guaranteed on the basis of the law, but by this time the land had been socialized as a "common property" and transferred to the peasants "on the basis of equalizing land use" (according to the Decree on Land adopted by the Second All–Russian Congress of Soviets on October 26, 1917, whose legitimacy by the rebels did not confess). In the Yaroslavl formula, it was not about the nationality of the land fund, but about the right of the peasant to fully own the land and about the legal guarantees of this property. Since at that time the idea of private ownership of land among the bulk of Russian peasants was not popular, it is possible that this very formulation deprived the rebels of the support of the bulk of the peasantry, since it was perceived as a smokescreen for an attempt to revise the result of the redistribution of land in 1917 with the return landlord land tenure.

The appeal also referred to the establishment of "strict legal order" as "the very first measure".

Opinions differ regarding the tactics and military objectives of the uprising. It is usually believed that the rebels hoped for help from the allies from the North (which was not received) and counted on the possibility of spreading the uprising to other cities in Central Russia and, as a result, everywhere, until the liberation of Moscow.

== Events ==
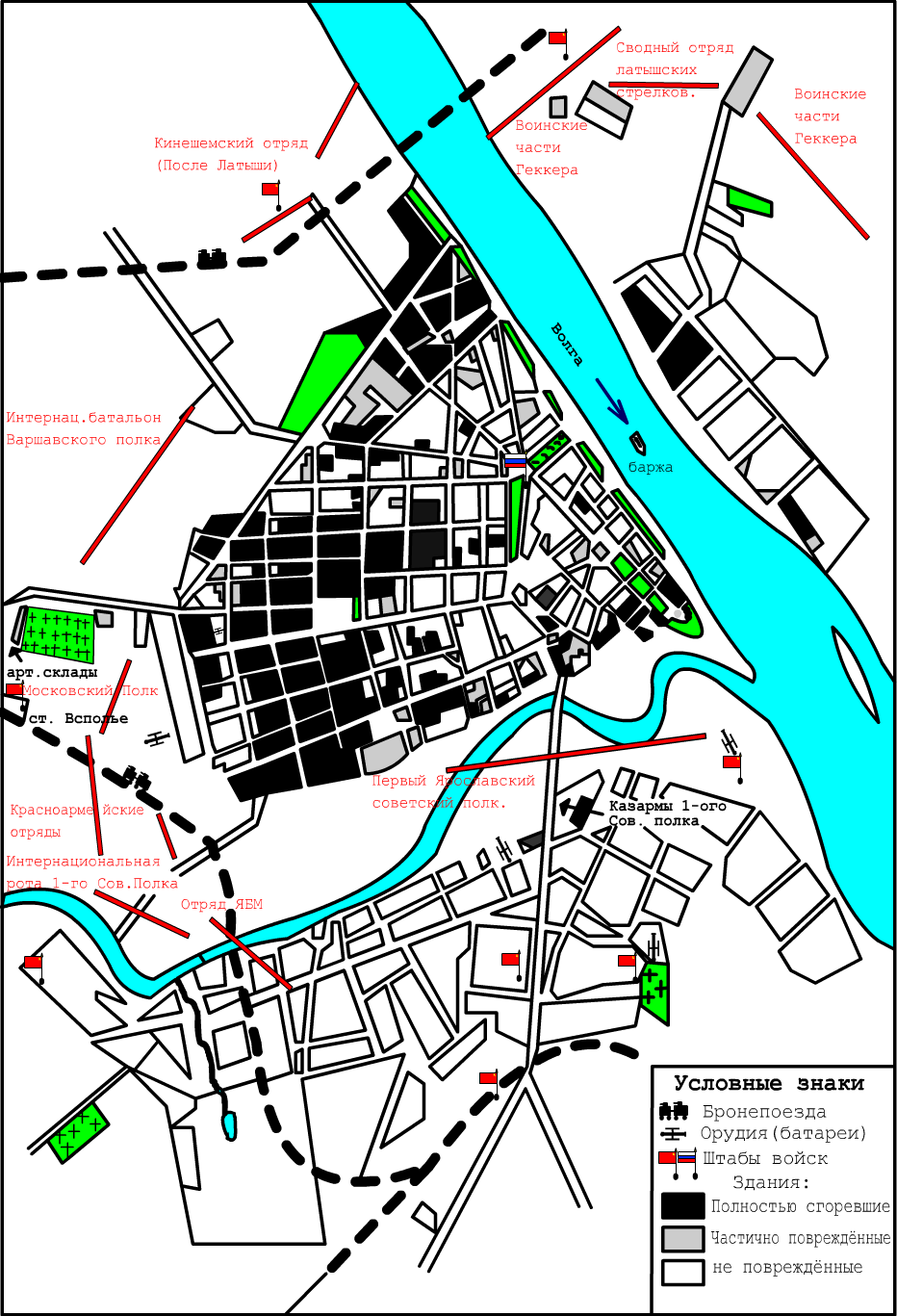
Scheme of the Yaroslavl Uprising

=== Forces of the parties ===
By the beginning of the uprising, the Union for the Defense of the Motherland and Freedom was able to legally concentrate up to 300 officers in the city (the officers' union in Yaroslavl itself numbered about 200 people, another 50 people arrived from Moscow, 30 from Kaluga and 12 from Kostroma).

Further, in the very first days, the leaders of the uprising announced the re–establishment of "self–defense" at the city government (first created in November 1917, but later disbanded by the Soviet government) and enrollment in the volunteer army. On July 6, mobilization was announced – compulsory for officers and voluntary for the rest. In general, the number of those who signed up for volunteers numbered about six thousand people, who were supported by the local clergy, intellectuals, as well as peasants in some suburban villages. However, according to the recollections of Perkhurov himself, there were no more than 600–700 people directly on the front line, most of the "volunteers" dispersed soon after the start of the fighting.

By the beginning of the uprising, the Bolshevik forces in Yaroslavl numbered about 1,000 bayonets, including: the 1st Soviet Regiment (500–600 bayonets), the Special Communist Detachment (200 bayonets), an auto–machine–gun detachment consisting of two armored cars and five machine guns, and a detachment of horse militia of 100 people. At the very beginning of the uprising, military specialists from among the officers, the auto–machine–gun detachment, the police and part of the personnel of the garrison went over to the side of the rebels. A Special Communist Detachment was taken by surprise, disarmed and arrested. The 1st Soviet Regiment at first declared its neutrality, but after a few hours passed to active actions against the uprising.

=== Beginning of the uprising ===
At the beginning of the uprising, the rebels were practically unarmed – for 105 people there were only 12 different–caliber revolvers and the very possibility of a performance depended only on the capture of weapons from the enemy. On the night of July 6, 1918, the conspirators, led by Alexander Perkhurov, gathered at the Leontief cemetery on the outskirts of Yaroslavl. About half a kilometer from the cemetery there was a warehouse of weapons brought from the front. The rebels attacked the Red Army men guarding the warehouse from several sides, seized it and began to take away the weapons. Thirty armed policemen were dispatched from the city to find out what was happening in the warehouse, as the telephone connection was interrupted, but they immediately joined the rebels. Later, the entire city militia went over to their side, and the provincial militia commissar, Ensign Falaleev, led one of the rebel detachments and later died in battle.

Armed, the rebels broke up into groups and moved into the city, where the armored division under the command of Lieutenant Suponin (2 cannon armored vehicles "Garford–Putilov" and 5 large–caliber machine guns) crossed over to their side. The 1st Soviet Regiment declared its neutrality.

Already by the morning, after a short battle, the Special Communist Detachment was completely disarmed and arrested, the Governor's House was captured, in which the Executive Committee and the Provincial Extraordinary Commission were located, the post office, telegraph, radio station and treasury were occupied. Thus, the entire center of Yaroslavl was in the hands of the rebels, and then the trans–Volga part of the city – Tveritsy.

The commissar of the Yaroslavl military district David Zakheim and the Chairman of the Executive Committee of the City Council Semyon Nakhimson were captured in the city apartments, who were the only insurgents killed without trial on the first day of the uprising. After the incident, Perkhurov banned lynching by issuing an order: "It is firmly remembered that we are fighting against rapists for legal order, for the principles of freedom and personal inviolability".

About 200 Soviet and party workers (including delegates to the congress), communists and their supporters were arrested and placed on a barge, which was taken from the shore and anchored.

=== Height of the uprising ===
In Soviet historiography, it is noted that the expansion and spread of the uprising was largely facilitated by the indecision, which in the early days of the uprising was displayed by the local leadership of the Workers' and Peasants' Red Army – the district military commissar Vasily Arkadiev and the military leader (former Tsarist general) Nikolai Liventsev.

Having taken control of most of the city, the rebels set up their headquarters on Epiphany Square in the city drawing room near the former Transfiguration Monastery.

Alexander Perkhurov proclaimed himself "Commander–in–Chief of the Yaroslavl Province and Commander of the Group of Forces of the Northern Volunteer Army". The formation of the Northern Volunteer Army, subordinate to the high command of General Mikhail Alekseev, was announced, in the ranks of which about six thousand people signed up (of which 1600–2000 participated in the battles). Among those who entered the army were officers, workers, intellectuals, student youth, peasants from the surrounding villages. The workers of the railway workshops sent 140 people, built an armored train, and also repaired weapons and armored cars. But weapons were not enough, especially guns and machine guns (the insurgents had only 2 three–inch cannons and 15 machine guns at their disposal). Therefore, Perkhurov resorted to defensive tactics, expecting help with weapons and people from Rybinsk.

On July 8, the city was restored to the city government "on the basis of the Law of the Provisional Government of 1917".

On July 13, by his resolution, Perkhurov, to "restore law, order and public peace", abolished all bodies of Soviet power and canceled all its decrees and resolutions, and "the authorities and officials that existed under the laws in force until the October coup of 1917" were restored.

The rebels failed to capture the factory settlements across the Kotorosl River, where the 1st Soviet Regiment was located. Soon, the Reds from the Tugovaya Gora dominating over the city began shelling Yaroslavl. The insurgents' expectation that the very fact of the uprising would raise the Yaroslavl and neighboring provinces turned out to be untenable – the initial success of the uprising could not be developed, although some of the peasants were ready to support the uprising.

Meanwhile, the Soviet military command hastily pulled together troops to Yaroslavl. In the suppression of the uprising, not only the local regiment of the Workers' and Peasants' Red Army and workers' detachments took part, but also detachments of the Red Guard from Tver, Kineshma, Ivanovo–Voznesensk, Kostroma and other cities.

=== Defeat of the uprising ===
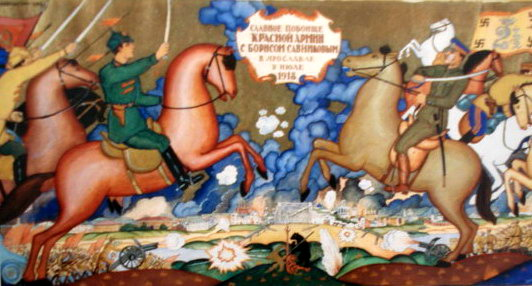
"The Glorious Battle of the Red Army with Boris Savinkov in Yaroslavl in July 1918". Lubok, 1926

On July 11, 1918, the provincial military revolutionary committee was formed, headed by Kirill Babich. Yuri Guzarsky was appointed commander of the forces on the southern bank of Kotorosl, and Anatoly Gekker, who arrived from Vologda on July 14, was appointed commander of the troops on both banks of the Volga near Yaroslavl.

The ring of red troops, at first very weak, began to shrink more and more. It became obvious that the rebels could not hold the city for long. The uprisings in Rybinsk (July 8) and Murom (July 9) were suppressed. Detachments of the Red Guard and part of the "internationalists" (in particular, the Chinese, German and Austro–Hungarian prisoners of war) launched an offensive against Yaroslavl.

The newspaper "Kommersant" details the ethnic composition of the "red units" who arrived in Yaroslavl to suppress the anti–Bolshevik uprising: "Two hundred Latvian Riflemen and a group of artillerymen arrived from Rybinsk. On July 8, the Warsaw Soviet Revolutionary Regiment, which was based on the Poles and the Sino–Korean company, moved up".

From behind Kotorosl and from the side of the Vspolye station (now Yaroslavl–Glavny), the city was continuously fired upon by artillery and armored trains. Red detachments bombed the city and the suburbs from airplanes. Yaroslavl was the first city in Russian history to be bombed almost entirely by aircraft. As a result of the air strikes, the magnificent Demidov Lyceum was destroyed.

According to the headquarters for the elimination of the mutiny: "in two flights, more than 12 poods of dynamite bombs were dropped, most of which, according to the information received, fell into the area of the enemy headquarters near the former governor's house... The pilots noticed severe damage to buildings and the resulting fires... The enemy did not open artillery fire, limiting himself to one or two shots from small–caliber guns, apparently from armored cars. At present, in view of the stubbornness of the enemy, it has been decided to intensify the bombardment, using for this purpose the most destructive force of the bomb".

However, the city's defenders stood firm, repelling enemy attacks. Desperate to break the resistance of the Yaroslavl people, Yuri Guzarsky on July 16, 1918, telegraphed the command:

Send urgently 10,000 rounds, half shrapnel, half grenades, and five hundred incendiary and five hundred chemical rounds. I guess I'll have to raze the city to the ground.

— Russian State Military Archive. Fund 1. Inventory 3. Case 83. Sheet 353.

The Reds subjected the city to artillery fire "across the squares", as a result of which streets and entire neighborhoods were destroyed. In the part of the city covered by the uprising, up to 80% of all buildings were destroyed. Fires raged in the city as the fire station and city water pumping station were destroyed.

In view of the overwhelming numerical and technical superiority of the Reds, further continuation of the armed struggle for the rebels became futile. At the convened military council, Perkhurov insisted on breaking through the army from Yaroslavl and leaving either to Vologda or to Kazan to meet the People's Army. However, most of the commanders, being local residents, led by General Karpov, refused to leave the city and decided to continue the fight as long as possible. The complexity of the situation was that the participants in the uprising were both officers who came from other cities, and retired soldiers and officers of the Russian army who lived in Yaroslavl, and civilians who took up arms. For the first, the military aspect of the "operation" was important first of all, for the others the rate was immeasurably greater: they defended not only themselves, but also their families, and they had no way of retreat. As a result, it was decided to send for reinforcements a detachment of 50 people, led by Alexander Perkhurov, who left Yaroslavl on a steamer on the night of July 15–16, 1918. General Pyotr Karpov, whose family lived in Yaroslavl, remained the commander in the city (according to the protocols of the Yaroslavl Extraordinary Commission, he was shot in September 1918). The departure of Perkhurov negatively affected the morale of the rebels, but they continued to resist.

By July 20, it became clear to the rebels that there was nothing to resist further, their forces and ammunition were running out. The rebel headquarters decided to end the resistance. But they decided to surrender not to the Red troops, but to the "German Commission of Prisoners of War No. 4" headed by Lieutenant K. Balk, interned from the beginning of the uprising in the city theater.

On July 21, the fighters remaining in Yaroslavl surrendered to the German commission. Although its chairman K. Balk assured the surrendered insurgents that the commission would take the position of "armed neutrality" and would not hand them over to the Bolsheviks, almost immediately he handed over all the Bolsheviks, who immediately shot them.

== Significance of the uprising ==
The uprising was defeated due to weak organization, lack of weapons (which became the reason for the defensive strategy of the rebels), the numerical superiority of the Red forces and their intensive use of artillery and aviation. As Boris Savinkov later noted: "There was nothing to arm with in Yaroslavl. One has to be surprised not that Colonel Perkhurov did not defeat the Bolsheviks at Yaroslavl, but that he was able to hold out for 17 days".

Despite the defeat of the uprising in Yaroslavl, it had a significant impact on the development of hostilities in the Volga and the Urals. It did not allow the Bolsheviks to transfer their reserves to the Volga and Ural Fronts, which led to heavy defeats of the Red troops and the capture of Yekaterinburg, Simbirsk and Kazan by anti–Bolshevik forces.

== Historiographic estimates ==
Initially, contemporaries, who held different political views, called the event that took place in Yaroslavl "uprising". But in the 1930s, this word was replaced by the label–concept "rebellion", which for decades reigned supreme in Soviet historiography. However, the old concept of "uprising" continued to exist in emigre literature. Evgeny Ermolin and Vyacheslav Kozlyakov drew attention to this duality. As historians have noted, the reason for this shift in emphasis in the naming of events in Yaroslavl was the ideological content of the concepts of "uprising" and "rebellion". If Soviet historians endowed the "uprising" with the status of inevitability and objectivity, which in the context of Marxist methodology had a positive connotation, then the concept of "rebellion" was associated with anarchy, caprice, arbitrariness, and lawlessness of the actions carried out. Insisting on an émigré interpretation of the events in Yaroslavl, Yevgeny Ermolin and Vyacheslav Kozlyakov noted two signs that, in their opinion, allow characterizing these events as a large–scale popular uprising against the Bolsheviks:

1. In the first half of 1918, there was still a persistent general belief in the illegality and temporality of the power of the Bolsheviks, which influenced the motives of the actions of the rebels. The moral and legal right to speak out against the usurpers of power was on the side of the rebels, who sought to preserve the legal and cultural continuity with the pre–Bolshevik times and restored the former authorities. The Yaroslavl uprising did not have a narrow–party, sectarian character.
2. The role of the conspiratorial officers from the Savinkov organization of the Union for the Defense of the Motherland and Freedom was significant only at the first moment of the movement's start. In the future, many residents of the city turned out to be under the banners of the rebels, so the element of events significantly changed the original goals.

== Aftermath of the uprising ==
=== Dead ===
==== Soviet side ====
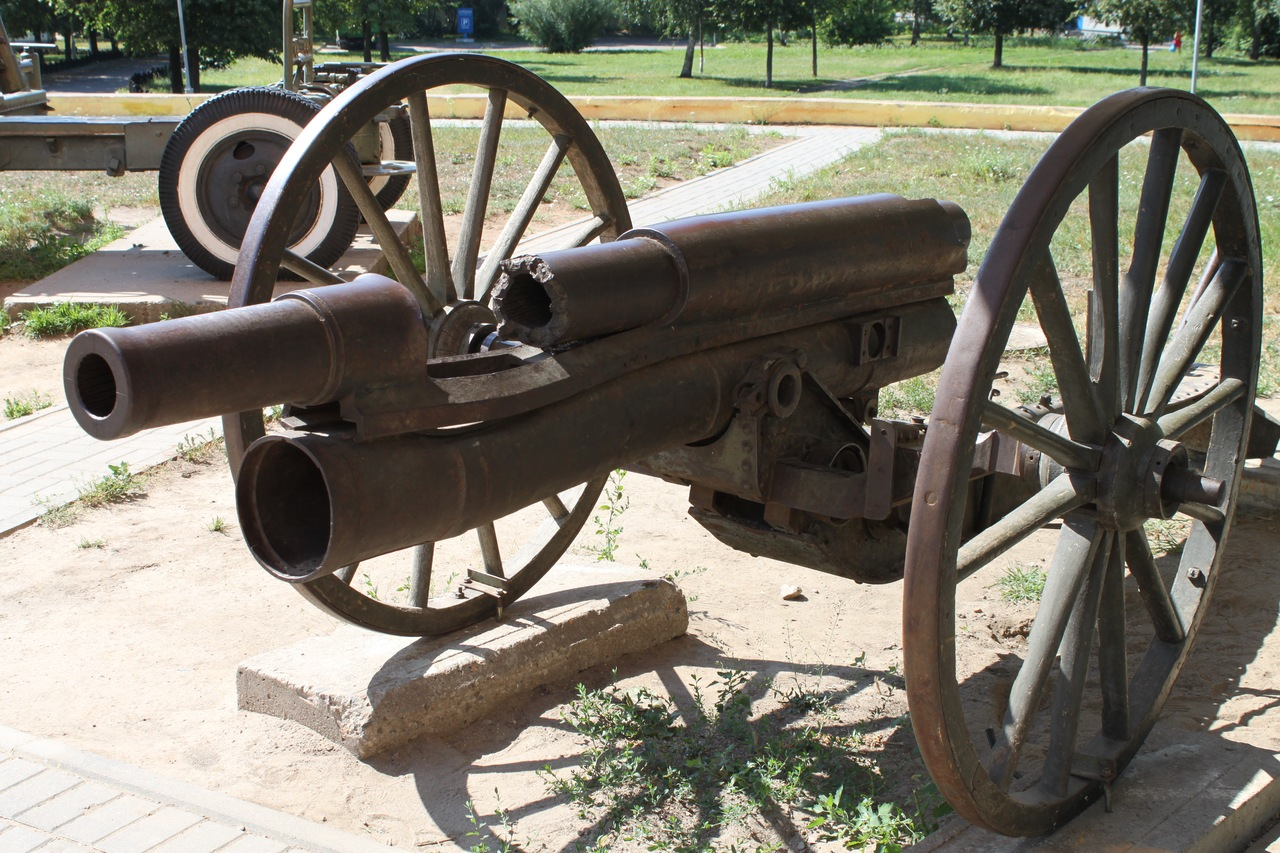
76–mm cannon mod. 1902, who participated in the shelling of Yaroslavl. The gun was disabled by a shell that exploded in the bore. Currently – an exhibit of the Museum of Military Glory in Yaroslavl

The rebels arrested over 200 communists and workers of Soviet institutions; Chairman of the Provincial Executive Committee Semyon Nakhimson, Chairman of the Executive Committee of the City Council David Zakheim were killed, several dozen more Soviet workers were interned on the so–called "death barge", anchored in the middle of the Volga. When the prisoners tried to leave the barge, they were shot at, but on the 13th day they managed to weaken the anchor and the barge sailed to the location of the troops of the Workers' and Peasants' Red Army (by this time 109 people remained alive on board).

The Newspaper Pravda called for revenge, having printed on July 14, 1918, that is, long before the Bolsheviks officially declared the Red Terror, the following appeal:

In Yaroslavl, by the rebellious White Guards were killed Dobrokhotov... Zacheim... Nahimson... The most staunch, tested fighters of the proletarian army have been killed... Yaroslavl comrades! We expect an answer from you: how many hundreds of reptiles and parasites have you exterminated for these three precious lives of our friends? Pop, officer, banker, manufacturer, monk, merchant's son – all the same. Neither a cassock, nor a uniform, nor a diploma can be their protection. No mercy for the White Guards!

The number of Red Army soldiers who died in the suppression of the uprising is unknown.

Yuri Guzarsky, who led the suppression of the uprising, was arrested in 1919 and executed for disobeying orders.

In 1958, a monument to the victims of the White Guard rebellion was erected on Sovetskaya Square in Yaroslavl.

==== Anti–Bolshevik forces ====
During the fighting, about 600 rebels were killed. After the capture of Yaroslavl on July 21, 1918, a mass terror began in the city – the massacre of the rebels and residents of the city: on the very first day after the end of the uprising, 428 people transferred by Balk were shot (including the entire headquarters of the rebels – 57 people were shot), mainly officers, students, cadets, lyceum students. The number of those executed without trial in the first hours after the suppression of the uprising will never be known. Thus, it can be argued that, with the exception of the hundred of the rebels that managed to escape from the besieged city, almost everyone who took part in the uprising died. The shootings continued even later: in September, the Soviet press recorded more than 60 cases of executions of participants in the uprising. In total, in the Yaroslavl province from March to November 1918, according to the far from complete data of Sergei Melgunov, the Bolshevik authorities shot 5,004 people.

Savinkov, speaking in 1924 before the Military Collegium of the Supreme Court of the Soviet Union, said: "I want to say that, of course, I take responsibility for Yaroslavl entirely: I organized this case, I was the inspirer of this case, I was its soul. Yaroslavl was a fruitless and bloody attempt".

=== Material damage ===
Doctor of Historical Sciences Vasily Tsvetkov described the bombing of Yaroslavl as "barbaric" and "unjustified".

==== Destruction of the city ====
During the city battles, the city suffered significant material damage. 20 factories and plants burned down, including a tobacco and match factory, 4 felt, sawmill, lead bleaching, mechanical factories and others. Artillery fire and bombing destroyed 2,147 houses (28 thousand residents were left homeless) and destroyed: the Demidov Juridical Lyceum with its famous library, part of the shopping arcade, dozens of temples and churches, 67 government, medical, and cultural buildings.

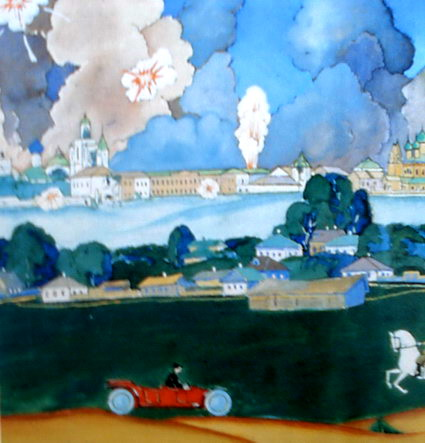
Alexander Malygin. The Fire of Yaroslavl in July 1918 (detail). 1928

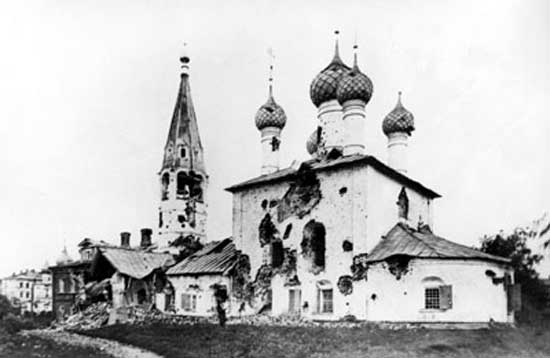
Church of Nikola Rubleny after the uprising

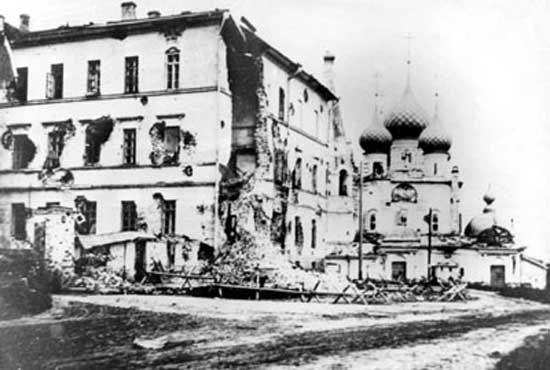
Main post office (now a military hospital) and the Church of the Savior on the City after the uprising

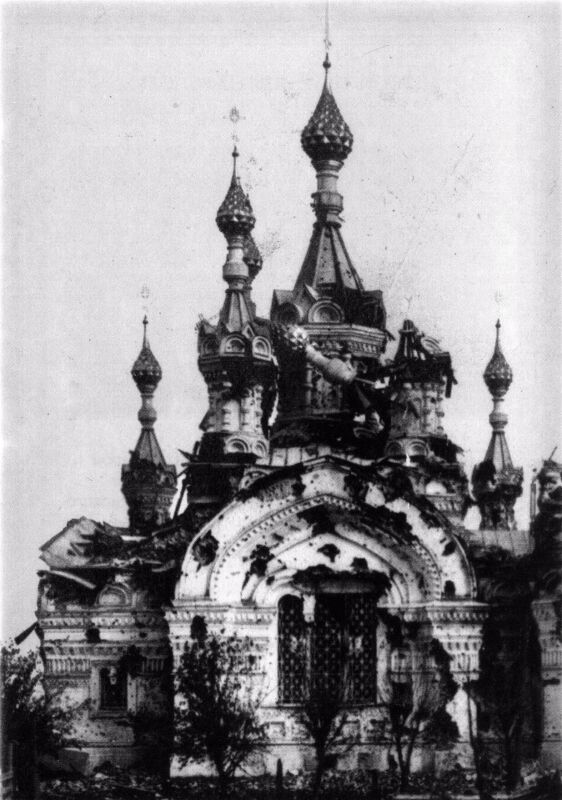
Church of the Intercession of Our Lady on Borisoglebskaya Street after the uprising

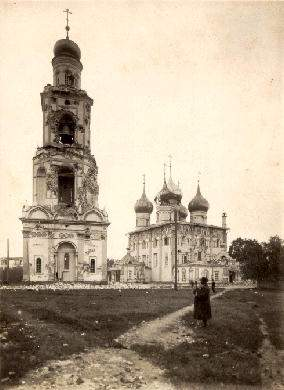
Assumption Cathedral after the uprising

==== Destruction of the museum's historical heritage of Russia ====
In the summer of 1918, the collections of the Petrograd Artillery Historical Museum, the largest museum of the Russian army, were kept in Yaroslavl, which contained military and artistic values associated with the history of all branches of the ground forces of Russia. The Provisional Government ordered the evacuation of the Artillery Historical Museum. It is believed that one of the reasons for the evacuation was the bronze from which the old weapons were made – a strategic metal that Germany was in dire need of. Yaroslavl was chosen as the temporary location of the museum. On September 25, 1917, three barges, loaded with the most valuable weapons, other exhibits and archives, sailed from Petrograd, accompanied by Ensign Kuryshev and three gunners of the 1st Heavy Artillery Brigade, who selflessly tried to save funds from all military and revolutionary cataclysms. In July 1918, the area of the Spassky Monastery, where the museum property was kept, became a battlefield, in the resulting fire, 55 boxes with banners and weapons were completely burned: a total of about 2,000 banners (including valuable, strelets), all trophies collected during the First World War war, 300 copies of old firearms and edged weapons. 54 valuable guns were damaged on the barges, the archive of the 2nd half of the 18th century and partially – of the 1st half of the 19th century died in the water.

During the days of the uprising, as a result of a fire in the printing house, the manuscript of the last book of a prominent Russian sociologist and jurist, academician Bogdan Kistyakovsky, "Law and Science of Law", was irretrievably lost. In Yaroslavl, many materials from the scientific expedition of Boris Vilkitsky of 1911–1916, which studied the possibility of laying the route of the Northern Sea Route off the coast of Taimyr, also perished (the expedition discovered the Vilkitsky Strait, the Land of Emperor Nicholas II (renamed into the Northern Land), the Island of Tsarevich Alexey (Maly Taimyr Island), Andrey Vilkitsky Island and others). The surviving maps and directions of the Vilkitsky expedition were used by subsequent expeditions of polar explorers in the 1930s.

The fire destroyed materials about the treatment of Alexander Pushkin after being wounded in a duel with Dantes, kept in the Zhuravsky family, descendants of Vladimir Dal, in whose arms the poet died.

== Reflection in literature, art, journalism ==
- An aspiring Soviet playwright and journalist Alexander Afinogenov in 1925 published a collage play "The Snake Trail: A Chronicle of the Yaroslavl Rebellion in 38 Episodes" (Yaroslavl: Casting, 1925, 31 Pages);
- The emigre writer Leonid Zurov wrote the novel "Cadet" (Riga, 1928), which combines personal experience of participation in the White movement with the use of information obtained from direct participants in the Yaroslavl uprising. The hero of the story, cadet Mitya Solomin leaves the burnt estate and goes to Yaroslavl, where, together with other students of the local cadet corps, he takes part in an armed uprising against the Bolshevik regime;
- Soviet prose writer Alexei Panteleev, who was a witness to the events in childhood, reflected his impressions in the story "Lyonka Panteleev" (1938, 1952), described in detail the life of the townspeople during the days of the uprising;
- In the memoirs of Veniamin Kaverin about Yury Tynyanov "Friend of Youth and All Life", the author notes that the thesis about Kuchelbecker of a student of Petrograd University, the future outstanding literary critic and prose writer Yuri Tynyanov burned down during the uprising along with the library he had been collecting since his gymnasium years;
- The story of Robert Shtilmark "The Volga Blizzard" (another name is "The Passenger of the Last Flight", the first publication was the magazine "Around the World", 1974);
- In the novel by Alexey Tolstoy "Walking Through the Agony", an artistic version of the uprising is given;
- The uprising is narrated by Nikolai Chukovsky in the novel "Yaroslavl";
- The image of the uprising was created in the 1920s by the Yaroslavl artist Alexander Ivanovich Malygin in a series of popular prints;
- Yaroslavl prose writer Herbert Kemoklidze in the novel "Salin" portrayed Semyon Nakhimson, who became one of the first victims of the events;
- In 2018, director Sergei Pikalov, commissioned by Channel One, filmed the television series Mutiny, which tells about the participants in the uprising.

== Remembrance ==
- In the summer of 1918, a solemn funeral of prominent representatives of the Bolshevik Party who died during the uprising took place in Demidovsky Square. In 1919, a wooden rotunda monument was erected on their grave designed by the architect Konstantinovich. In 1958, the dilapidated wooden monument was replaced by a granite monument with bronze and stucco details, designed by architects Mikhail Egorenkov and Kaleria Kozlova;
- In Yaroslavl, a number of city streets are named after the Bolsheviks who died during the uprising: Nakhimson Street, Zakheim Street; there are also several streets on the outskirts of the city named after the social democrat Sergei Suvorov. Several streets are named after the red commanders who participated in its suppression: Gromov Street, Babich Street;
- In 2017, deputies of the Yaroslavl Regional Duma Vasily Tsependa and Sergei Balabaev prepared a bill according to which the day of the beginning of the uprising – July 6 – was proposed to be made a memorable date for the Yaroslavl region. In addition, the initiators proposed creating a memorial in Yaroslavl in memory of the tragic events of the summer of 1918. The draft law was not approved by the relevant committee. After the introduction of this initiative at a meeting of the Yaroslavl Regional Duma, the law was rejected by a majority of votes;
- In 2018, for the 100th anniversary of the uprising, no significant commemorative events organized by the authorities took place in Yaroslavl. Historian Yevgeny Solovyov published the book "The Shot Yaroslavl", which examines in detail the course of dramatic events on the Volga, analyzes its causes and consequences. The public organization "Youth Council of the City of Yaroslavl" has released a game in which the participants experience the days of the uprising, looking at it through the eyes of participants on different sides of the front.

== See also ==
- Bibliography of the Russian Revolution and Civil War
- Outline of the Russian Revolution and Civil War
- Index of articles related to the Russian Revolution and Civil War
- The "Russian" Civil Wars, 1916–1926: Ten Years That Shook the World
- Russia in Flames: War, Revolution, Civil War, 1914–1921
- Russia in Revolution: An Empire in Crisis, 1890 to 1928
- Russia: Revolution and Civil War, 1917—1921
- The Russian Revolution: A New History
- Izhevsk–Votkinsk Uprising
- Tambov Uprising (1920–1921)
- Slutsk uprising

== Sources ==
- Yaroslavl Mutiny // "Tashkent" – Rifle Cell / Edited by Andrey Grechko – Moscow: Military Publishing House of the Ministry of Defense of the Soviet Union, 1976 – (Soviet Military Encyclopedia: In 8 Volumes; 1976–1980, Volume 8)
- Sixteen Days. Materials On the History of the Yaroslavl White Guard Revolt (July 6–21, 1918) – Yaroslavl, 1924
- Lazar Genkin. Yaroslavl Workers During the Civil War and Intervention – Yaroslavl, 1958
- Rafail Balashov. Flame Over the Volga (Liquidation of the White Guard Mutiny in Yaroslavl in the Summer of 1918) – Yaroslavl, 1984
- Red Book of the All–Russian Extraordinary Commission (In 2 Volumes) / Under the Scientific Editorship of Alexei Velidov. Book 1. 2nd Edition – Moscow: Publishing House of Political Literature of the Central Committee of the Communist Party of the Soviet Union, 1989
- Alexander Perkhurov. Confession of a Condemned (Story By the Leader Of the White Guard Rebellion in Yaroslavl) – Rybinsk, 1990 – 37 Pages
- Yaroslavl Uprising. July 1918 / Posev Magazine – Special Issue For 1998
- Ilya Ratkovsky, Mikhail Khodyakov. History of Soviet Russia – Saint Petersburg: "Doe", 2001
- Yaroslavl Uprising. 1918 / Compiled by Evgeny Ermolin, Vyacheslav Kozlyakov – Moscow: International Fund "Democracy": Materik, 2007 – (Russia. 20th Century. Documents)
- Outside the Windows of Ivanov's House. Pages of Yaroslavl History (Collection). The Compilers and Authors of the Foreword are Alexander Rutman, Galina Mozgova. Yaroslavl: Publisher Alexander Rutman, 2008
- Vasily Tsvetkov, ed. (1998). Yaroslavl Uprising. July 1918. Library of Russian Studies. Issue No. 2 (1st ed.). Moscow: Sowing. Archived from the original on February 13, 2012.
- Evgeny Ermolin. The Ideology of the Yaroslavl Uprising
- Alexey Kidyarov. Soviet Historiography of the Yaroslavl Rebellion of 1918 // Scientific Bulletin of Belgorod State University, Volume 7, Issue 14 – 2010
- Evgeny Solovyov. Shot Down Yaroslavl: Historical Panorama Of the Tragedy Of the City On the Volga, July 1918 (To the 100th Anniversary of the Yaroslavl Uprising) – Yaroslavl: "Academy 76", 2018 – 687 Pages – ISBN 978-5-906040-48-0
