= Boris Savinkov =

Russian revolutionary and writer (1879–1925)

- Борис Савинков
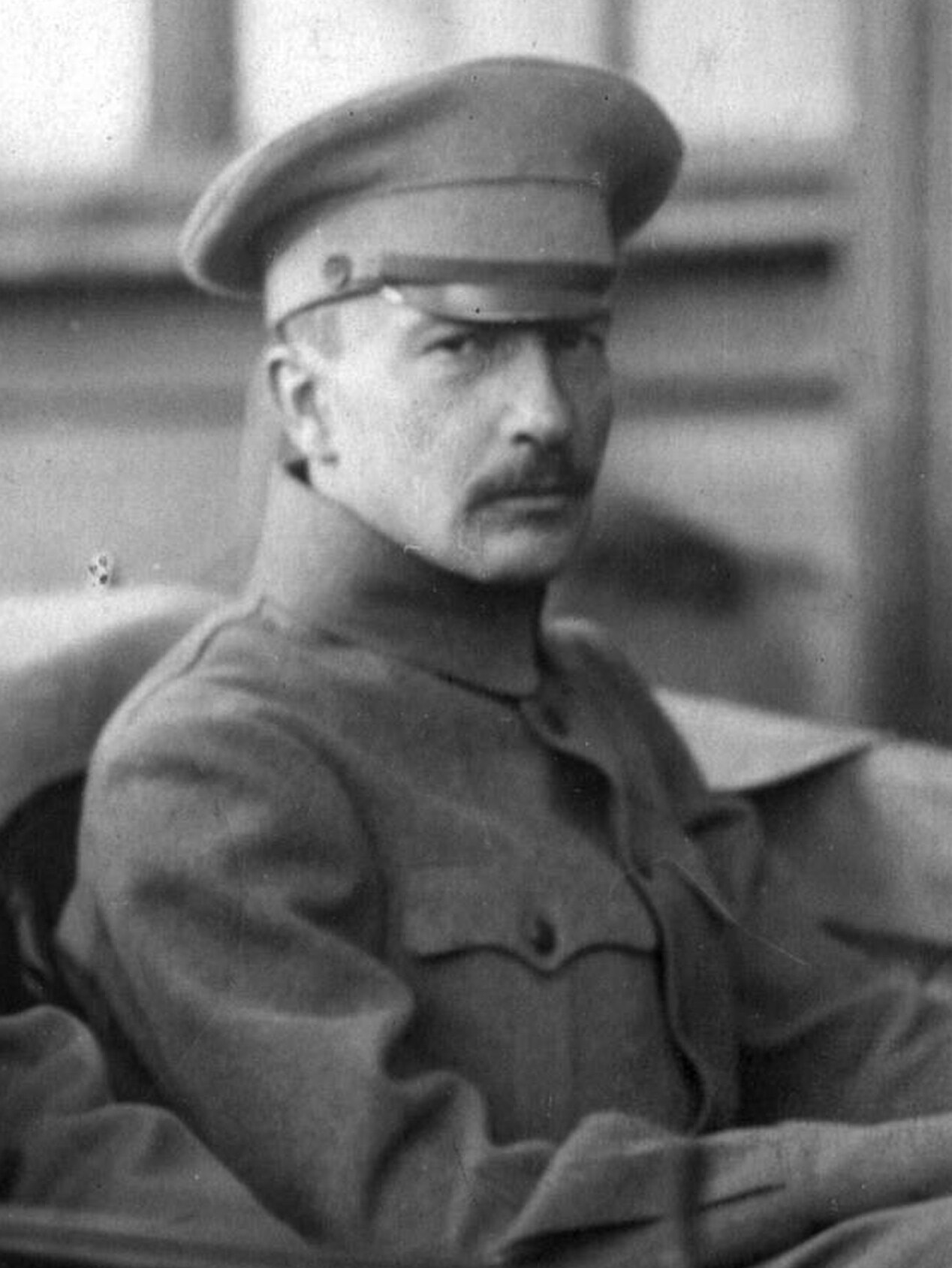
- Savinkov in 1917
- Born: Boris Viktorovich Savinkov; 31 January 1879; Kharkov, Russian Empire
- Died: 7 May 1925 (aged 46); Lubyanka prison, Moscow, Soviet Union
- Cause of death: Defenestration (murder or suicide)
- Other name: V. Ropshin
- Education: St. Petersburg University; University of Berlin; Heidelberg University
- Organizations: SR Combat Organization (1903–1907); Union for the Defense of the Motherland and Freedom (1918); Russian Political Committee (1920–1921)
- Notable work: The Pale Horse (1909)
- Political party: Socialist Revolutionary Party (1903–1917)

Assistant Minister of War in the Russian Provisional Government
- In office July 1917 – September 1917
- Prime Minister: Alexander Kerensky

Boris Viktorovich Savinkov (Russian: Борис Викторович Савинков; 31 January 1879 – 7 May 1925) was a Russian revolutionary, writer, and politician. As a leading figure in the Socialist Revolutionary Party's (SR) Combat Organization, he was a key organizer of high-profile assassinations of tsarist officials, including that of Interior Minister Vyacheslav von Plehve in 1904 and Grand Duke Sergei Alexandrovich in 1905. Following the February Revolution of 1917, Savinkov served as Assistant Minister of War in the Russian Provisional Government. After the October Revolution, he became a prominent leader of armed resistance against the Bolsheviks, notably founding the Union for the Defense of the Motherland and Freedom.

Savinkov's political career was characterized by dramatic shifts in allegiance and a reputation as an enigmatic "revolutionary rogue." He transitioned from militant anti-tsarism to patriotic nationalism during World War I, and later became a dedicated anti-Bolshevik, before an apparent, though controversial, repentance in Soviet captivity. He was deeply involved in numerous conspiracies, collaborating at various times with diverse figures and groups, including several foreign governments. His complex personality—a blend of charm, intelligence, ruthlessness, and a penchant for intrigue—drew varied contemporary assessments, from a "Russian Bonaparte" to a diabolical figure.

As a writer, using the pseudonym V. Ropshin, Savinkov authored several novels, memoirs, and poems that often reflected his revolutionary experiences and inner conflicts. His most famous work, The Pale Horse (1909), provided a controversial depiction of terrorist psychology and the moral dilemmas faced by revolutionaries.

In 1924, Savinkov was lured back to the Soviet Union by the OGPU in a sophisticated sting operation known as Operation Trust. He was arrested, put on trial, and sentenced to death, though this was later commuted. He died in Lubyanka prison in Moscow in 1925; official accounts stated suicide by defenestration, but the circumstances surrounding his death remain disputed, with some evidence and contemporary claims suggesting murder.

== Early life and education ==
Boris Savinkov was born in Kharkov on 31 January (O.S. 19 January) 1879, the son of Viktor Mikhailovich Savinkov, a judge from a Russian noble family, and Sofia Aleksandrovna Savinkova (née Iaroshenko), a writer and dramatist. His father was a liberal who served as a military prosecutor and later a district Justice of the Peace in Warsaw. Sofia, the daughter and granddaughter of generals, was a strong-willed and rebellious woman who profoundly influenced Boris's development. The Savinkov family was culturally affluent; Boris was exposed to a wide range of literature and developed a passion for action and adventure tales. An important early influence was his maternal uncle, Nikolai Iaroshenko, a general turned artist and a prominent figure in Russia's progressive intelligentsia, who admired the radical Narodniks of the 1870s.

Savinkov attended the 1st Warsaw Boys' Gymnaziia, an exclusive school primarily for the sons of Russian officials. There, he met Ivan Kalyayev, who became his inseparable friend and an early influence on his revolutionary path. Despite the school's conservative environment, it harbored a cell of crypto-radicals affiliated with the Polish Socialist Party (PPS), which both Savinkov brothers and Kalyayev joined. Growing up in Warsaw, Savinkov developed a strong sympathy for the Polish national cause and became fluent in Polish.

In 1897, Savinkov entered the law school at Saint Petersburg State University. He became involved in student activism, initially associating with Marxist circles influenced by Georgi Plekhanov and later with the "economist" Rabochaya Mysl group. In late 1897, he and his brother Aleksandr were arrested for participating in a student protest against the Warsaw government's decision to erect a monument to Count M. N. Muravyov, notorious for his suppression of the 1863 January Uprising. This was the first of several arrests that increasingly radicalized him. In 1899, he married Vera Glebovna Uspenskaya, daughter of the populist writer Gleb Uspensky. Later that year, facing constant police surveillance, he moved to Germany to continue his education, first at the University of Berlin and then Heidelberg. In Germany, he was influenced by the works of Max Stirner and Friedrich Nietzsche, which contributed to his personal philosophy of action and self-indulgence. He also met Viktor Chernov, a future SR leader, in Paris in 1899.

== Revolutionary beginnings and terrorism ==
=== Early activities and shift to SRs ===
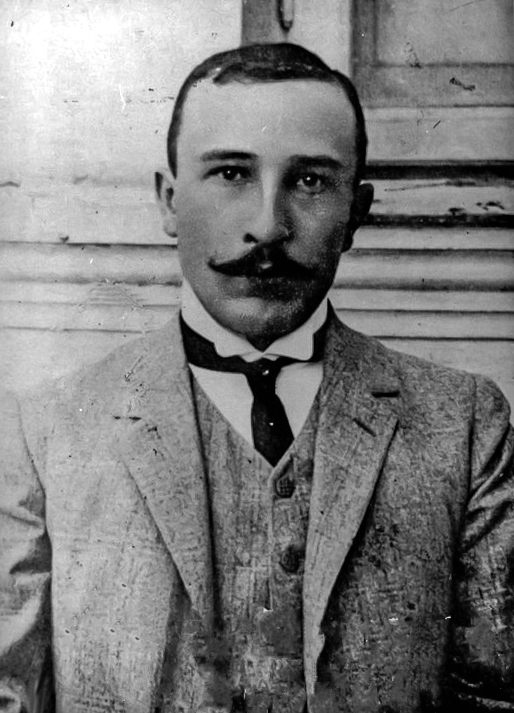
Savinkov in the 1900s

Savinkov returned to Russia in early 1900. Though still identifying as a Social Democrat, his views had shifted towards a more authoritarian and conspiratorial approach to revolution. He joined the "Socialist" (Sotsialist) Group in St. Petersburg, which included his brother Aleksandr and Pyotr Rutenberg, and resumed agitation work among factory workers. An article he wrote for the Marxist journal Rabocheye Delo in April 1900, advocating for a professional revolutionary cadre, impressed Vladimir Lenin, though Lenin criticized its overemphasis on conspiracy.

Increasingly disillusioned with the efficacy of worker agitation and critical of the Social Democrats' lack of a strong agrarian program, Savinkov's interest in populism grew. In January 1901, he had his first brush with terrorism when he was approached by Petr Karpovich and Aleksei Pokotilov, who were planning the assassination of Minister of Education Nikolay Bogolepov. Savinkov, believing the assassination of such a high official was impossible, initially denied them assistance from the Socialist Group. However, Bogolepov's subsequent assassination by Karpovich made a profound impression on him, marking a crucial step towards his embrace of terrorism.

In April 1901, Savinkov was arrested and imprisoned for nine months, first in the Peter and Paul Fortress and then the St. Petersburg House of Detention. This experience further solidified his conviction that tsarism could only be overthrown by conspiracy and violence. In January 1902, he was sentenced to administrative exile in Vologda. The exile community in Vologda included prominent figures like Nikolai Berdyaev and Anatoly Lunacharsky. Savinkov aligned himself with the "idealist" faction, led by Berdyaev, and publicly repudiated Marxism. It was during this period that he met Ekaterina Breshko-Breshkovskaya, a veteran revolutionary recruiting for the newly formed Socialist Revolutionary Party (PSR). The PSR recognized terror as a legitimate political weapon, and the recent SR-linked assassination of Interior Minister Dmitry Sipyagin in 1902 confirmed Savinkov's "spiritual conversion" to terrorism. Persuaded by Breshkovskaya and his friend Kalyayev, who had also embraced terrorism, Savinkov decided to join the SRs. In the spring of 1903, he escaped from Vologda with the help of Aage Madelung and made his way to Geneva, the SR leadership's base.

=== SR Combat Organization and assassinations ===
In Geneva, Savinkov met Mikhail Gots and Yevno Azef, leaders of the SR Combat Organization (BO). Azef, the acting chief, admitted Savinkov into the BO. The BO was then planning the assassination of Interior Minister Vyacheslav von Plehve. Savinkov, codenamed "Pavel Ivanovich", was sent to St. Petersburg in late 1903 to supervise surveillance. The initial period was marked by disorganization and Savinkov's own anxieties, leading him to briefly abandon the Plehve plot for an attempt on General Nikolai Kleigels in Kiev, a move that angered Azef.

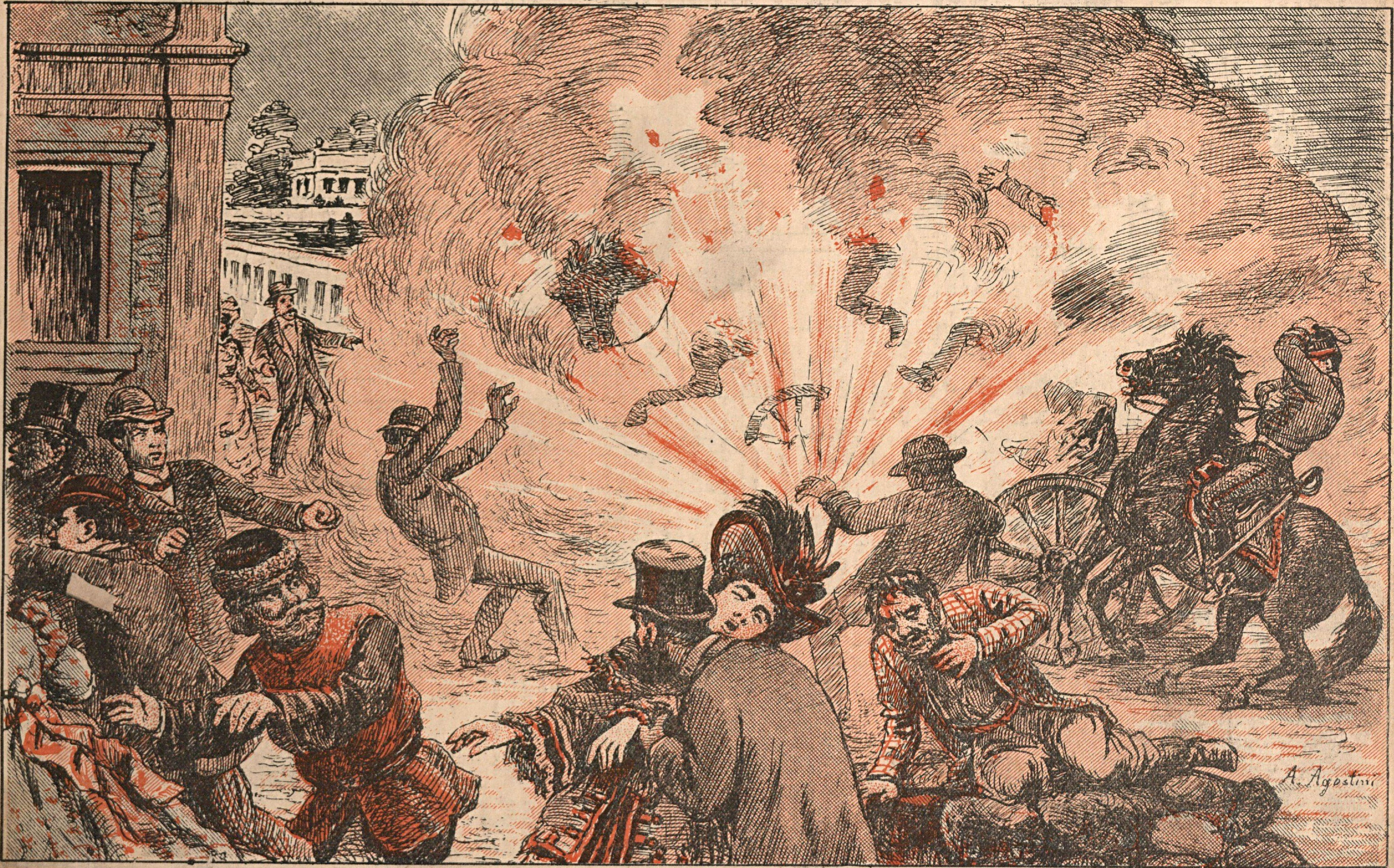
Depiction of Vyacheslav von Plehve's assassination

Under Azef's intermittent direction, the plot against Plehve resumed. New recruits included Egor Sazonov and Dora Brilliant. To facilitate operations and ensure his own safety, Savinkov adopted the persona of "Arthur MacCullogh", a wealthy British bicycle firm representative, living in an expensive flat with Brilliant (as his mistress) and Sazonov (as his lackey). After several failed attempts and further setbacks, including the accidental death of Pokotilov, Plehve was assassinated by Sazonov on 28 July (O.S. 15 July) 1904. Savinkov, who was nearby, fled to Geneva with Kalyayev. The assassination significantly boosted the BO's prestige and Savinkov, alongside Azef, was hailed as a hero within the SR party. Savinkov became Azef's second-in-command.

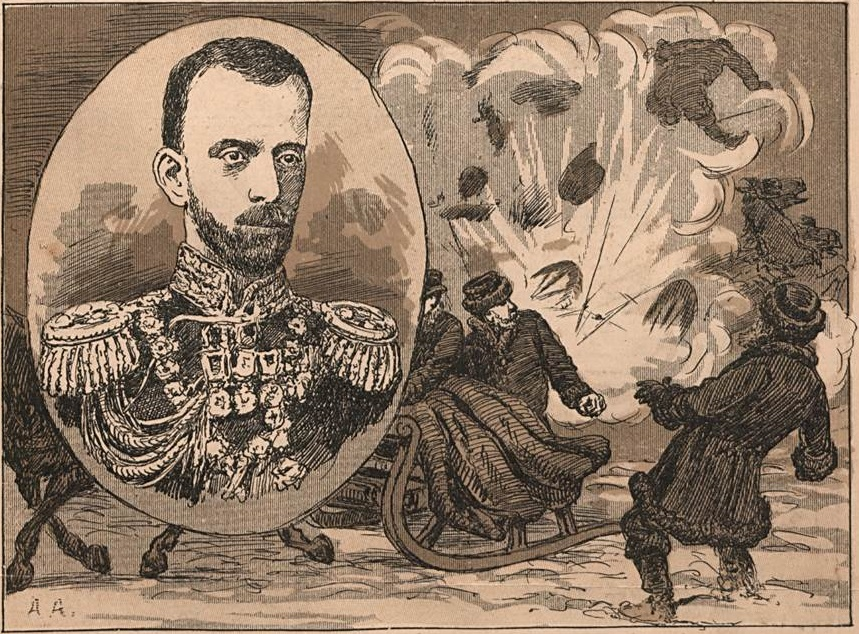
Depiction of Grand Duke Sergei Alexandrovich's assassination

The next major target was Grand Duke Sergei Alexandrovich, the Tsar's uncle and Governor-General of Moscow. Savinkov returned to Russia in October 1904 to lead the operation, which also involved Kalyayev, Brilliant, and new recruits like Mariia Prokofieva and Petr Kulikovskii. After Kalyayev aborted an initial attempt on 15 February (O.S. 2 February) 1905, because the Grand Duke's wife and children were in the carriage, he successfully assassinated Sergei two days later, on 17 February (O.S. 4 February). Kalyayev was captured and later hanged. This success marked the zenith of Savinkov's terrorist career.

However, the BO suffered a devastating blow in February and March 1905 when a wave of arrests, orchestrated by police informer Nikolai Tatarov (an old Warsaw classmate of Savinkov's), decimated its ranks. Savinkov managed to escape abroad. Attempts to revive terrorist activities against figures like General Dmitri Trepov and Admiral Fyodor Dubasov failed due to a combination of poor organization, lack of resources, and Azef's betrayals. Savinkov, increasingly frustrated with Azef's leadership and the SR Central Committee's cautiousness, focused on eliminating Tatarov, who was killed in Warsaw in March 1906 under Savinkov's direction, though Savinkov was not directly involved in the act itself.

In May 1906, while organizing an assassination attempt on Admiral Grigoriy Chukhnin in Sevastopol, Savinkov and his comrades were arrested. Facing execution, he escaped from prison in July with the help of naval officer B. N. Nikitenko and fled to Romania, then Western Europe. The failure of subsequent terrorist plots, including an attempt on the life of Pyotr Stolypin, and the exposure of Azef as a police agent in 1908, led to the dissolution of the Combat Organization and a period of deep crisis for the SR party and Savinkov personally. Savinkov, who had vigorously defended Azef, was implicated in the scandal, though he claimed to have been Azef's dupe.

== Exile, literary career, and World War I ==
From 1909 to the outbreak of World War I, Savinkov lived mainly in Paris and on the French Riviera. This period was marked by personal and political disillusionment. He became a prominent figure in Parisian émigré circles, frequenting salons and cafes like La Rotonde, and associating with writers and artists such as Zinaida Gippius, Dmitry Merezhkovsky, Aleksey Remizov, Guillaume Apollinaire, Amedeo Modigliani, and Diego Rivera. Gippius and Merezhkovsky had a significant influence on his literary work and evolving worldview.

Using the pseudonym V. Ropshin, Savinkov wrote several books. His first novel, The Pale Horse (Kon' blednyi), published in 1909, was a thinly veiled autobiographical account of the assassination of Grand Duke Sergei. It caused a sensation in Russia and abroad with its frank depiction of the psychology of terrorism and its moral ambiguities. This was followed by What Never Happened (To, chego ne bylo), serialized in 1912, a more ambitious work tracing the revolutionary movement since 1904 and expressing a profound disillusionment with terrorism and the revolution itself. These works drew criticism from many former SR comrades, who accused him of betraying the revolutionary cause and of "moral Azefism". Savinkov formally resigned from all SR party positions in 1911.

The outbreak of World War I in 1914 revitalized Savinkov. He became a staunch "defensist", believing that the war against Germany transcended political divisions and that revolutionary activity must be sacrificed for Russia's military needs. He served as a war correspondent for several Russian newspapers, including the liberal Rech and the right-wing Birzhevyye Vedomosti, reporting from the French and Belgian fronts. His patriotic articles, collected in In France During Wartime (Vo Frantsii vo vremya voiny), were popular in Russia.

== Provisional Government and Kornilov affair ==
Savinkov returned to Russia in April 1917 after the February Revolution. He quickly became involved in the political turmoil of Petrograd, aligning himself with the Russian Provisional Government and advocating for a continuation of the war effort. He was appointed commissar of the 7th Army on the Southwestern Front and later chief commissar of the entire front. In these roles, he worked to restore discipline and combat defeatist agitation, particularly from the Bolsheviks.

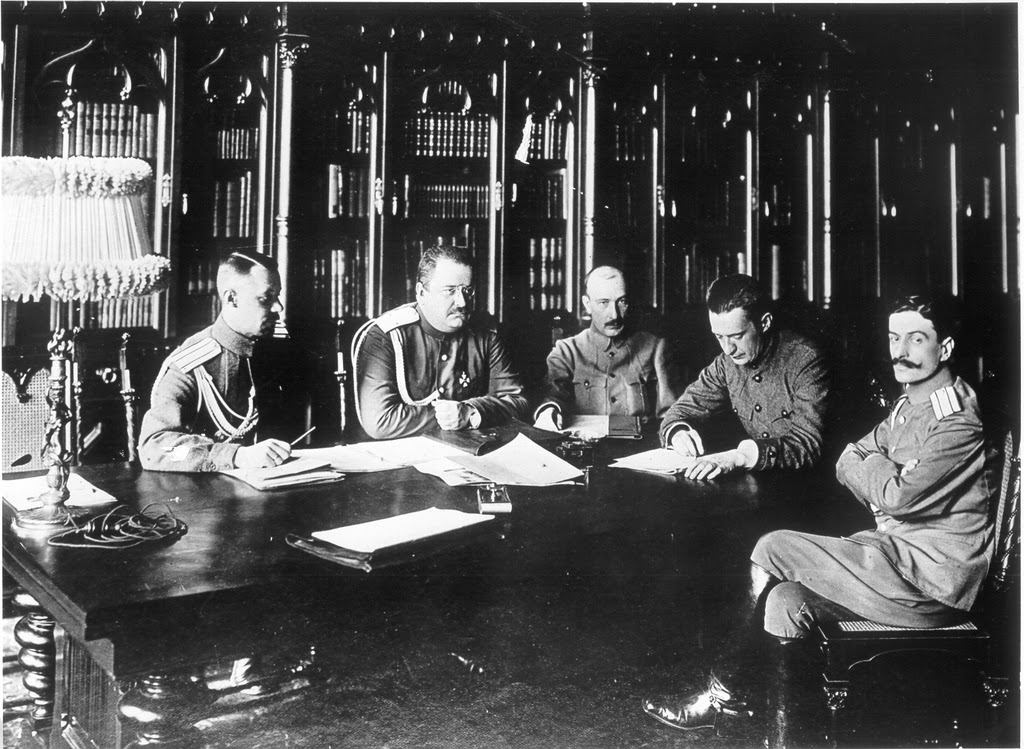
Savinkov (center) with Alexander Kerensky (second from right) and the rest of the Russian war ministry, August 1917

His energetic actions impressed Minister of War Alexander Kerensky, who, in July 1917, appointed Savinkov as Assistant Minister of War. Savinkov became a key figure in the government, advocating for strong measures to restore order in the army and the country, including the reintroduction of the death penalty at the front. He played a significant role in the appointment of General Lavr Kornilov as Supreme Commander-in-Chief. Savinkov envisioned a triumvirate of himself, Kerensky, and Kornilov to lead Russia, balancing democratic and military authority.

However, the relationship between Kerensky and Kornilov quickly deteriorated, culminating in the Kornilov affair of August 1917. Savinkov attempted to mediate between the two, but his efforts failed. When Kornilov marched on Petrograd, Savinkov sided with Kerensky and the Provisional Government. He was appointed General Governor of Petrograd and tasked with organizing the city's defense. The Kornilov revolt collapsed quickly, but the affair fatally weakened the Provisional Government and Savinkov's political standing. He was dismissed from his posts and expelled from the SR party in September 1917 for his role in the affair.

== Anti-Bolshevik activities ==
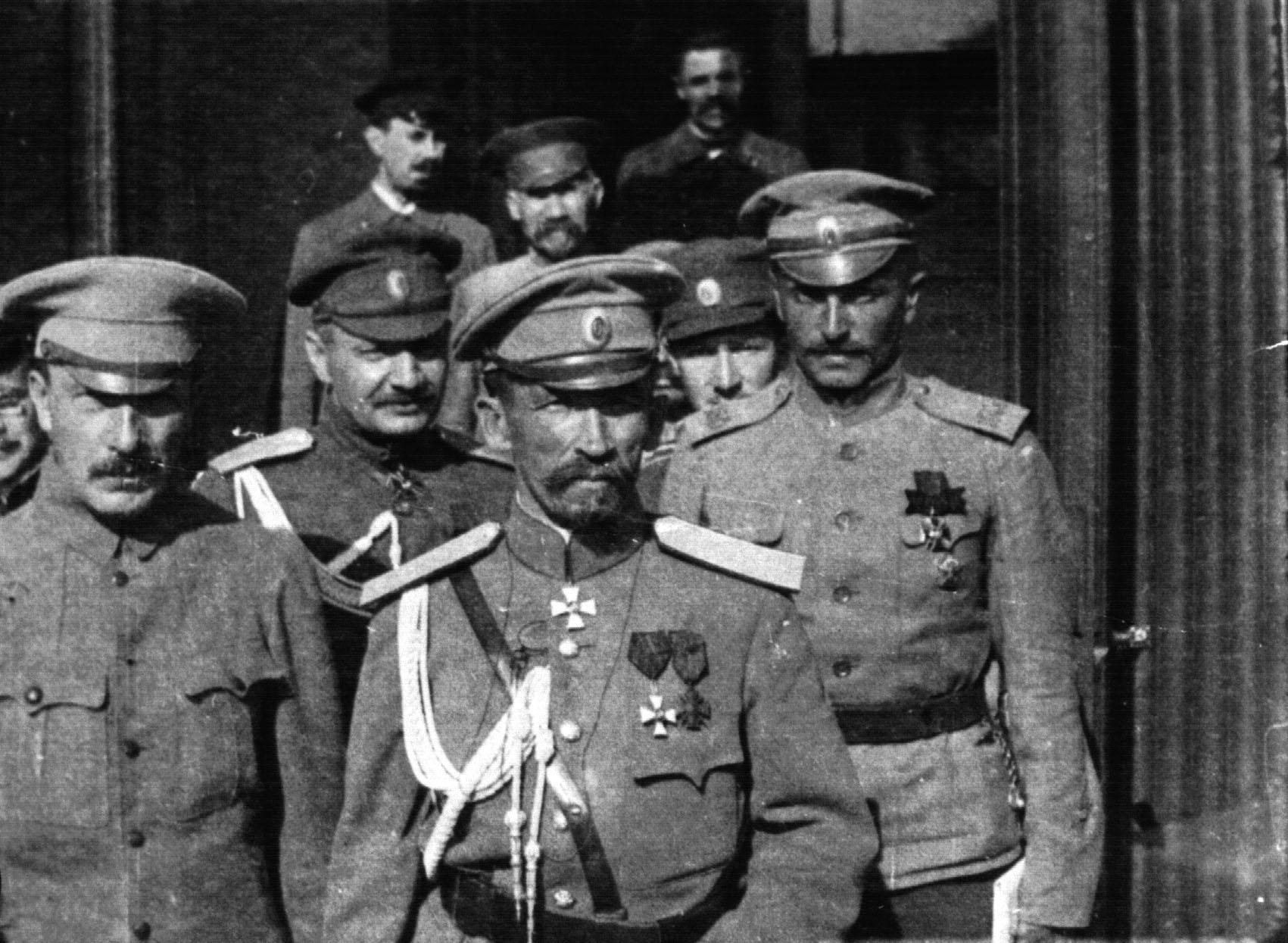
Savinkov (left) with General Lavr Kornilov (centre) and his staff, 1917.

After the October Revolution, Savinkov became a fervent opponent of the Bolshevik regime. He was involved in early anti-Bolshevik conspiracies in Petrograd, including a plot with Guchkovite officers and an attempted liaison with monarchist circles. In late 1917, he traveled to the Don region to join the nascent Volunteer Army led by Generals Mikhail Alekseyev and Kornilov. However, his relations with the White leaders were strained due to his revolutionary past and his insistence on a democratic platform.

In early 1918, Savinkov returned to Moscow and founded the Union for the Defense of the Motherland and Freedom (SZRiS), an underground anti-Bolshevik organization composed mainly of officers. The SZRiS aimed to overthrow the Bolsheviks through a coordinated uprising supported by Allied intervention. It received funding from Czech sources via Tomáš Masaryk and later from the French. Savinkov also established contact with British intelligence agent Sidney Reilly, who became a close associate. The SZRiS organized several uprisings in July 1918 in towns along the upper Volga, including Yaroslavl, Rybinsk, and Murom, timed to coincide with a planned Allied landing in Arkhangelsk. The uprisings were brutally suppressed by the Red Army, and Savinkov, whose forces in Rybinsk failed to act decisively, was forced to flee.

Savinkov eventually made his way to Kazan, which had been captured by Czech and Komuch (Committee of Members of the Constituent Assembly) forces. He briefly served in a unit under Colonel Vladimir Kappel but found himself politically isolated and unwelcome by many SRs in the Komuch government. After the fall of Kazan to the Reds, he traveled to Ufa for a state conference, and then to Omsk, the seat of the Provisional All-Russian Government (the Directory). In October 1918, he was dispatched on a diplomatic mission to the Allied powers in Paris by the Directory.

== Emigration, continued anti-Soviet efforts, and The Trust ==
Title page of a book of proceedings from the 1924 Savinkov show trial, published by the People's Commissariat of Internal Affairs.

Arriving in Paris in December 1918, Savinkov became a prominent figure in the White émigré community. He represented Admiral Alexander Kolchak's Omsk government and later General Anton Denikin's regime, lobbying for Allied military and financial support. He established close ties with Winston Churchill, then British Secretary of State for War, who became a strong advocate for Savinkov and his cause. However, his efforts were largely unsuccessful as Allied interest in intervention waned after the end of World War I.

In 1920, Savinkov moved to Warsaw and, with the support of Polish leader Józef Piłsudski, organized Russian military units to fight alongside the Polish army against the Bolsheviks during the Polish–Soviet War. He formed the Russian Political Committee (RPK) in Warsaw, which acted as a shadow government. His forces, known as the People's Volunteer Army (NDA), participated in the fighting, notably under the command of Stanislav Bulak-Balakhovich. While in Poland, Savinkov wrote the following in a Warsaw publication:

The Russian people do not want Lenin, Trotsky and Dzerzhinsky, not merely because the Bolsheviks mobilize them, shoot them, take their grain and are ruining Russia. The Russian people do not want them for the simple reason that ... nobody elected them.

After the Treaty of Riga ended the Polish–Soviet War in March 1921, Savinkov's position in Poland became untenable. Under Soviet pressure, the Polish government curtailed his activities and eventually expelled him in October 1921.

Savinkov then moved to Prague and later back to Paris, continuing his anti-Bolshevik activities, though with diminishing resources and influence. He maintained contact with various underground groups in Russia and plotted terrorist attacks against Soviet leaders. It was during this period that he became the target of an elaborate OGPU sting operation known as Operation Trust. Posing as a large, powerful anti-Soviet organization within Russia, "The Trust" (fronted by figures like Alexander Yakushev) lured Savinkov with promises of a widespread uprising and a leading role in a new government. Key figures in this operation who gained Savinkov's confidence included "Colonel Pavlovskii" (a turned OGPU agent) and "Andrei Mukhin/Fedorov" (a veteran Chekist).

== Return to the Soviet Union, trial, and death ==
Deceived by "The Trust" and increasingly isolated and desperate, Savinkov decided to return to Russia in August 1924. He was accompanied by "Mukhin", "Pavlov", and his mistress Aimée Dikgof-Derenthal, who may have been a collaborator with the OGPU. He was arrested by the OGPU in Minsk on 20 August.

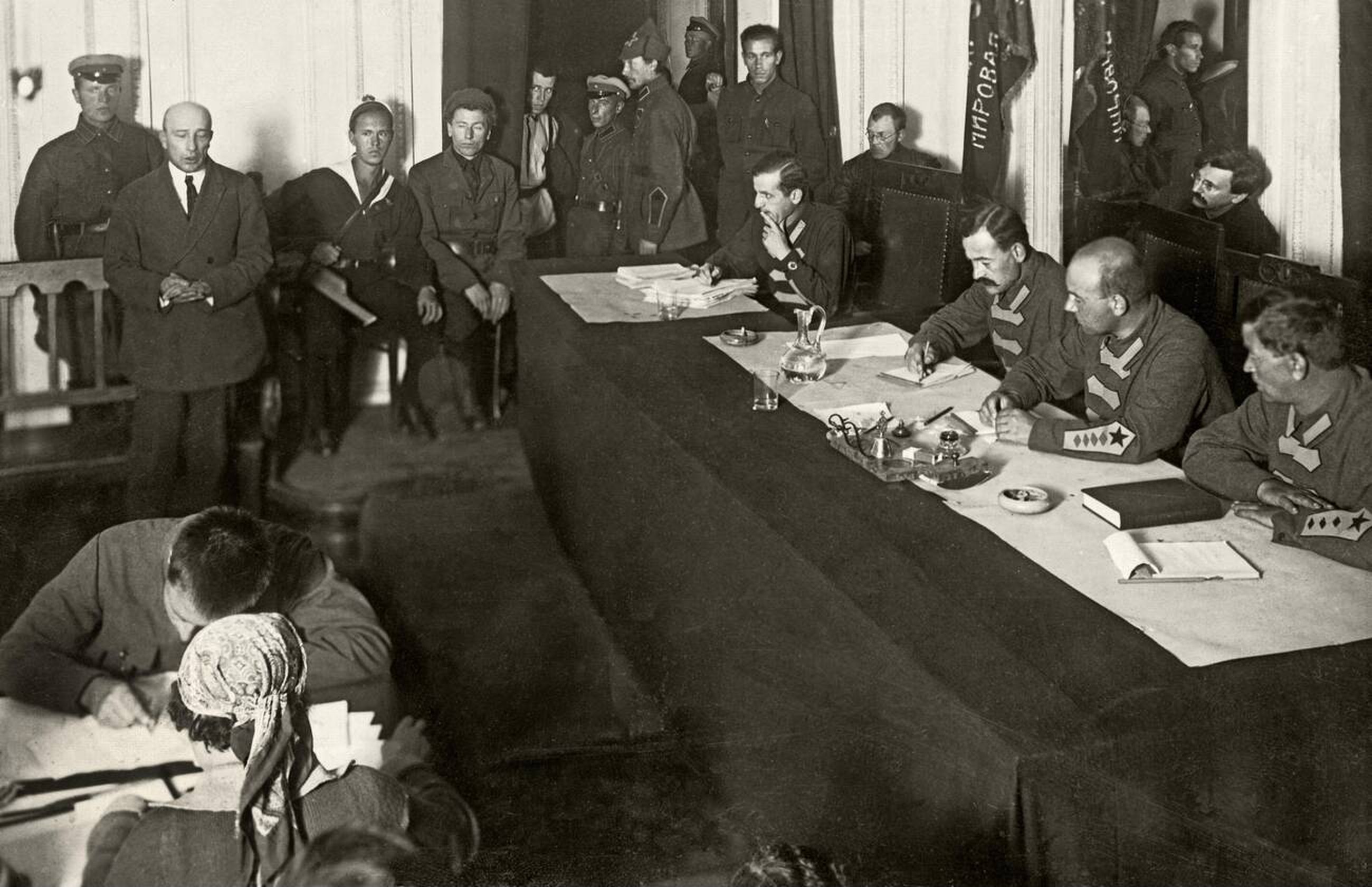
Savinkov (standing on left) during his trial before the Military Collegium of the Supreme Tribunal of the Soviet Union, 1924

Savinkov's trial before the Military Tribunal of the Supreme Court of the USSR took place in Moscow from 27 to 29 August 1924. The trial was a major propaganda event for the Soviet regime. Savinkov confessed to his crimes against the Soviet state and repudiated his past anti-Bolshevik activities, declaring his recognition of Soviet power. He was sentenced to death, but the sentence was immediately commuted to ten years' imprisonment by the Presidium of the Central Executive Committee (VTsIK).

Savinkov was imprisoned in the inner prison of the Lubyanka. He was reportedly treated well, given a furnished room, allowed visitors (including Aimée Derenthal), and permitted to write. He produced several short stories and began an autobiography. However, his hopes for an early release or a significant role in Soviet life did not materialize.

On 7 May 1925, Savinkov died after allegedly jumping from a fourth-floor window in the Lubyanka prison. The official cause of death was suicide. However, doubts about this version persisted. Some contemporaries and later historians suggested he was murdered by the OGPU, possibly thrown from the window or killed in an escape attempt that was then covered up. Aleksandr Solzhenitsyn later recounted a story from a former Chekist, Artur Pryubel, who claimed that Savinkov was indeed thrown from the window by OGPU officers.

== Political views and character ==
Boris Savinkov was a complex and contradictory figure, often described as an "artist of adventure". His political views evolved significantly throughout his career, from Marxism to SR populism, to a form of nationalist authoritarianism, and finally to a claimed acceptance of the Soviet regime. He was consistently anti-tsarist and later anti-Bolshevik, but his positive political program remained vague and often shifted according to circumstances and personal ambition.

A staunch individualist, Savinkov was impatient with party discipline and ideology. He possessed considerable personal magnetism, courage, and literary talent, but was also seen as vain, arrogant, cynical, and ruthless. He was a skilled conspirator and organizer of terrorist acts, though he rarely participated directly in the violence himself. His fascination with strong leaders, violence, and decisive action, coupled with a disdain for parliamentary democracy, led some to see him as a precursor to fascism. He cultivated a Napoleonic image and was often driven by a desire for personal glory and a central role in historical events. Spence notes that Savinkov was a "creature of opposition, a knight errant who was always more sure of what he was against than what he supported".

Ilya Ehrenburg, who met Savinkov in Paris in 1916, wrote that:

Never before had I met so incomprehensible and frightening a man. His face was startling because of his Mongolian cheekbones and his eyes, now sad, now extremely cruel; he often closed them, and his lids were heavy... In reality, Savinkov no longer believed in anything. Once he told me that it was the Azef affair that broke him. Up to the very end he had believed the agent provocateur to be a hero... Savinkov turned to writing mediocre novels revealing the inner emptiness of a terrorist who has lost faith in his cause.

Savinkov praised Benito Mussolini, approving of his nationalist and anti-communist policies and meeting personally with him several times with the hope of gaining Italian support in his anti-Bolshevik activities. In a series of letters to Mikhail Artsybashev in early 1924, Savinkov expressed his preference for fascism as opposed to the ideas of his former SR comrades Kerensky and Nikolai Avksentiev. He also voiced his belief in Fascist Italy being a fundamentally democratic regime as it derived its support from the Italian peasantry, and admitted to finding fascism "psychologically and ideologically close" to his own views.

== Personal life ==
Savinkov married Vera Glebovna Uspenskaya in 1899. They had two children: a son, Viktor (born 1900), and a daughter, Tatiana (Tania). The marriage was intermittent and eventually ended in divorce after Savinkov's prolonged exiles and numerous infidelities. He later had a long-term relationship with Evgeniia Ivanovna Somova (née Zilberberg), with whom he had a son, Lev, born around 1912 or 1913. Evgeniia accompanied him through many of his later exiles. His final prominent mistress was Aimée Dikgof-Derenthal, who was with him during his activities in Poland and his return to the Soviet Union.

Savinkov was known for his expensive tastes, stylish dress, and love of luxury, often funded by party or organizational resources. He was a heavy user of morphine, particularly in periods of stress or disillusionment. Despite his often cynical exterior, he maintained a deep, if complex, attachment to his mother, Sofia Aleksandrovna, who was a constant supporter throughout his revolutionary career.

== Works ==
- The Pale Horse (novel), 1909 (English edition 1919, online), Russian: Конь бледный (Kon' blednyj) – published under the pseudonym "V. Ropshin"
- What Never Happened: A Novel of The Revolution, 1912 (English edition 1917, online), Russian: То, чего не было (To, chego ne bylo) – published under the pseudonym "V. Ropshin"
- Memoirs of a Terrorist, 1917 (English edition 1931), Russian: Воспоминания террориста (Vospominanija terrorista)
- On The Path to a "Third" Russia, 1920 (Russian edition 1920), Russian: На пути к "Третьей" России (Na puti k "Tret'yey" Rossii)
- The Black Horse (novel), 1924 (Russian edition 1923), Russian: Конь вороной (Kon' voronoj)
- In the prison (novel), 1924 (Russian edition 1924), Russian: В тюрьме: Посмертный рассказ (V t'urme: posmertnyi rasskaz)
- In France during the war (collection of articles), 1917 (Russian edition 1917), Russian: Во Франции во время войны (Vo Francii vo vremia voiny) – published under the pseudonym "V. Ropshin"
- Why I Recognized Soviet Power? (collection of articles ), 1924 (Russian edition 1924), Russian: Почему я признал Советскую власть? (Pochemu ja priznal sovetskuju vlast?)
- "Boris Savinkov's Letter to Felix Dzerzhinsky", in The Russian Review, Vol. 29, No. 3 (July 1970), pp. 325–327

== See also ==
- The Rider Named Death, a loose adaptation of The Pale Horse
- Reilly, Ace of Spies
