= List of administrative leaders of Qingdao =

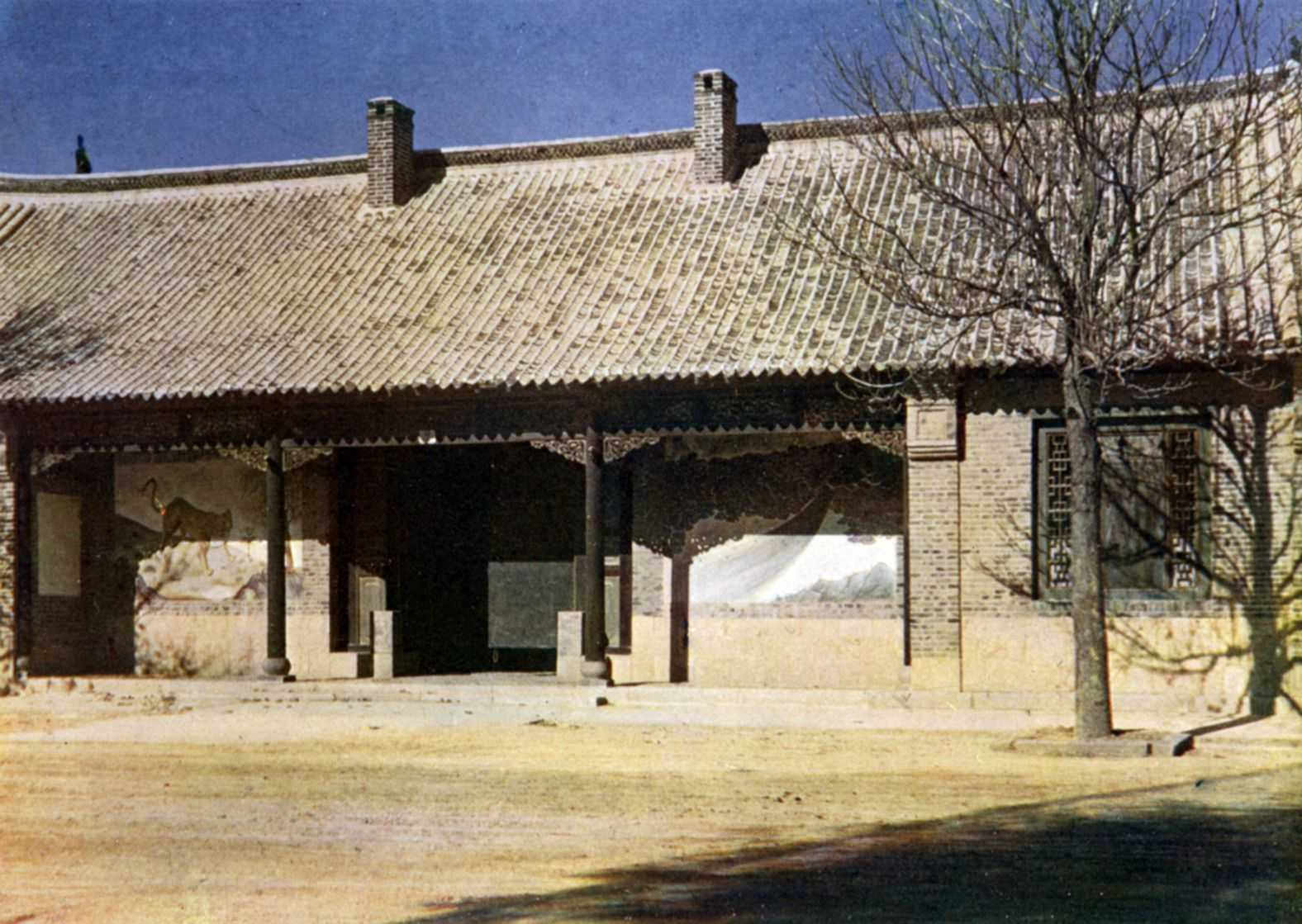
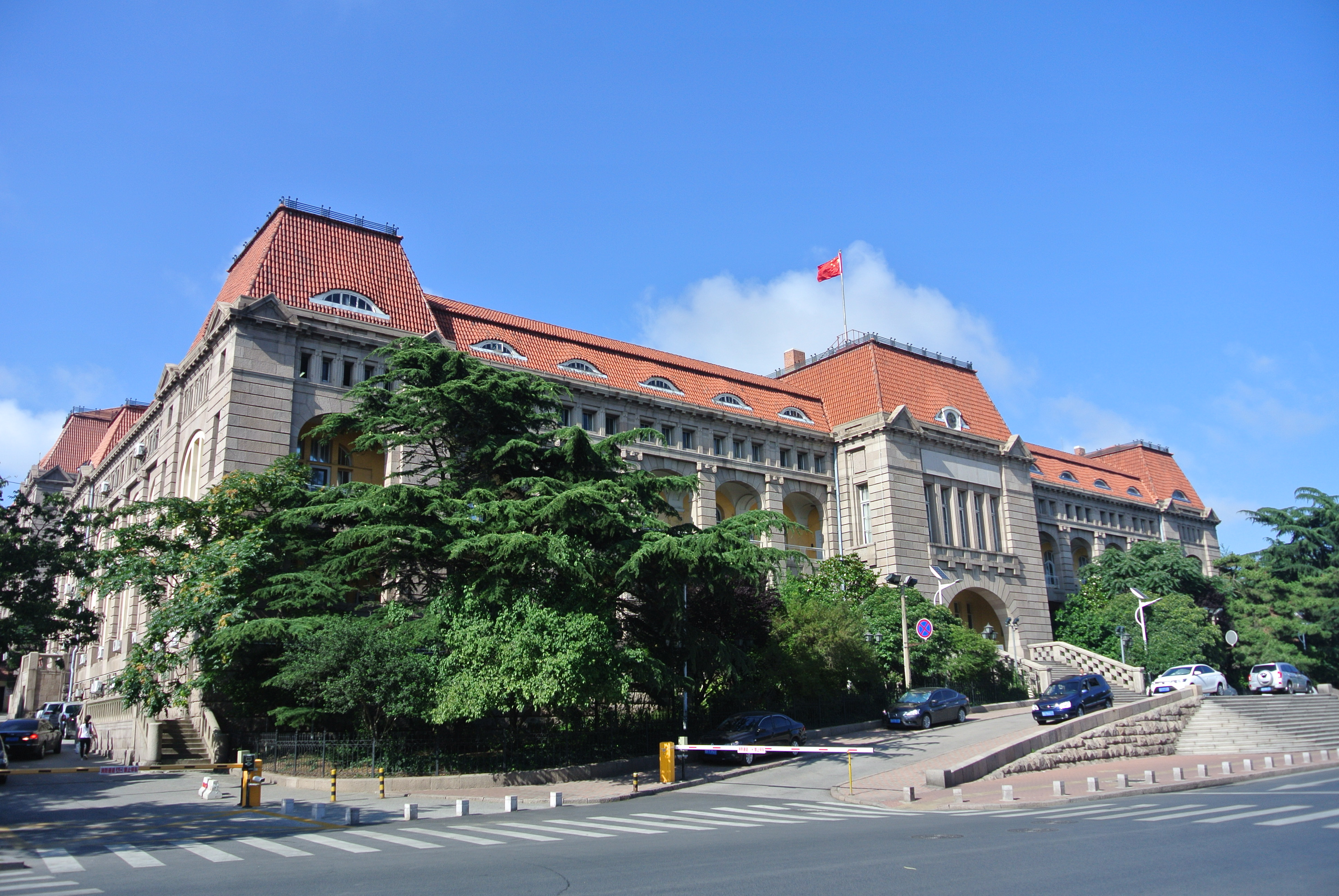
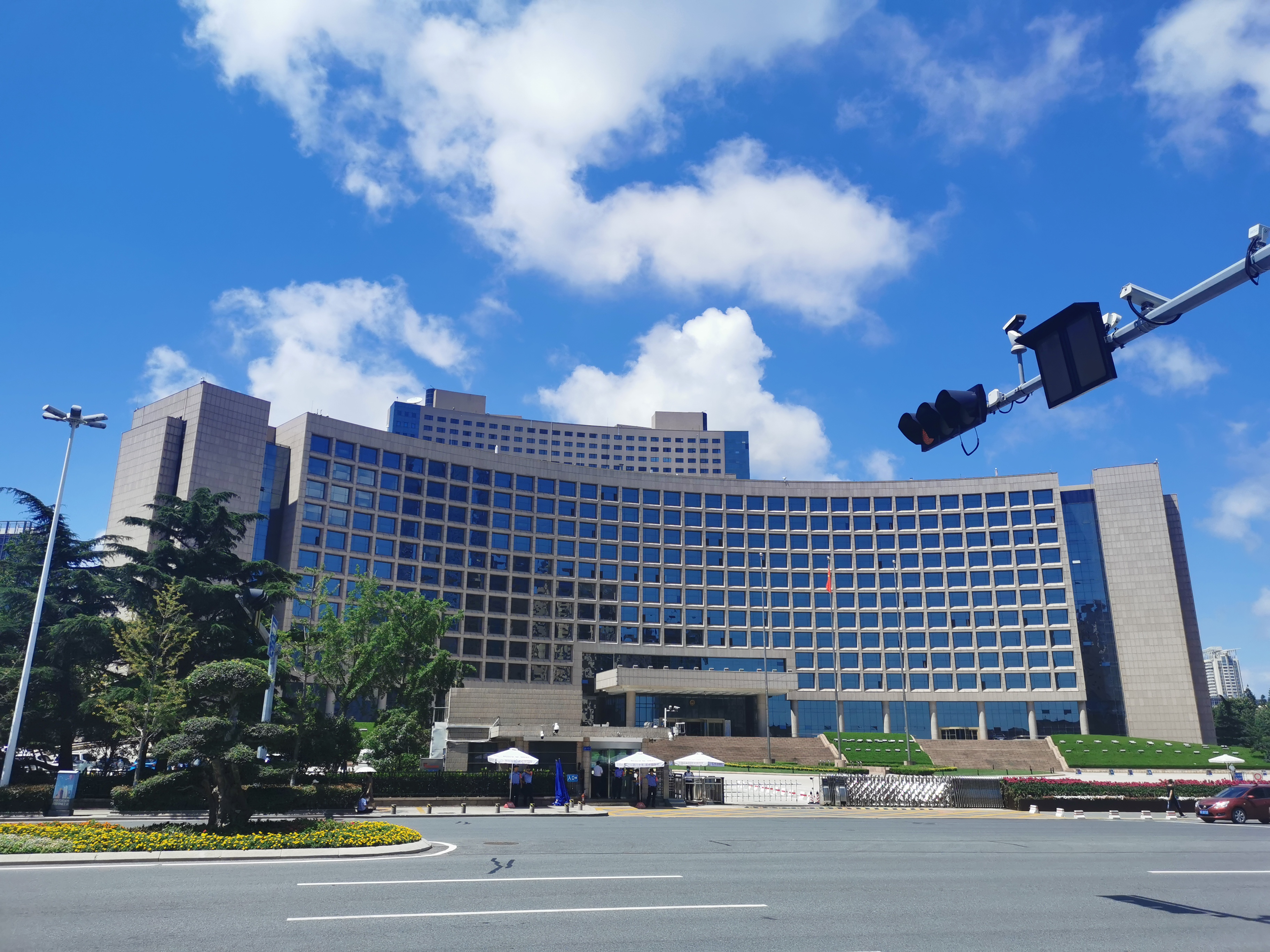
The Zongbing Yamen (Qingdao), the office building of the Jiaozhou Bay Governor-General’s Office, and the Qingdao Municipal Government Building No. 1 respectively served as the administrative centers of the Qingdao area from the 1890s to 1906, from 1906 to 1994, and from 1994 to the present.

This list presents the chief administrative leaders of Qingdao since the establishment of the settlement in 1891, including all mayors of Qingdao since the city's formal establishment in 1929. Only individuals who actually served as, or acted as, the highest administrative authority of the Qingdao area are included, together with their periods of service within the urban area of Qingdao. Persons who served solely as heads of the Qingdao municipal organizations of the Kuomintang (KMT) or the Chinese Communist Party (CCP) are not included. Nor does this list discuss or enumerate the de facto rulers of Qingdao during different historical periods.

After the Qing dynasty approved the establishment of defenses at Qingdao in 1891, military and civil affairs of the area were administered by the Commander-in-Chief (Zongbing) of Dengzhou stationed at Qingdao. Following the lease of Qingdao by the German Empire in 1898, the Jiaozhou Bay Governorate was established, and the Governor of Kiautschou served as the chief military and civil authority of the region. After Qingdao was occupied by the Empire of Japan in 1914, the Qingdao Garrison Command was established, with its commander acting as the military and administrative head of the area.

Following the recovery of Qingdao by the Beiyang government in 1922, the city's administration was successively headed by the Commissioner of the Jiaozhou Commercial Port and the Director-General of the Jiaozhou Commercial Port Bureau. After the Nationalist government took over Qingdao in 1929, the Municipality of Qingdao was formally established, and the Mayor of the Qingdao Municipal Government became the city's chief administrative officer.

After the Japanese military occupied Qingdao again in 1938, the Qingdao Public Security Maintenance Association was organized under Japanese sponsorship. In the following year, the Qingdao Special Municipality Office was established and later reorganized as the Qingdao Special Municipal Government, whose chief executive continued to bear the title of mayor. Following the end of the Second Sino-Japanese War in 1945, the Qingdao Municipal Government was restored.

After the People's Liberation Army took control of Qingdao in 1949, the Qingdao Municipal People's Government was established. In 1956 it was reorganized as the Qingdao Municipal People's Committee, while the chief executive continued to hold the title of mayor. During the Cultural Revolution, the Qingdao Revolutionary Committee was established in 1967, and its chairman served as the city's chief administrative authority. The Qingdao Municipal People's Government was re-established in 1980 and has continued to function to the present day.

== Zhang Gaoyuan’s garrison period ==
In June 1891, Li Hongzhang, the Viceroy of Zhili, and Zhang Yao, the Governor of Shandong, inspected Jiaozhou Bay by warship and, on 13 June, jointly memorialized the Guangxu Emperor requesting that defenses be established in the area. (Note: On July 20, 1990, the Standing Committee of the 10th Qingdao Municipal People's Congress reviewed and approved the "Report of the Qingdao Municipal People's Government on Determining the Establishment Date of Qingdao and Holding Commemorative Activities for the 100th Anniversary of its Establishment," thus officially establishing June 14, 1891, as the date of Qingdao's establishment.) On 14 June, the Guangxu Emperor issued an imperial edict approving the proposal.

In August 1892, Zhang Gaoyuan, Commander-in-Chief (zongbing) of Dengzhou, led four battalions of the Huai Army from Dengzhou Prefecture to Jiaozhou Bay. He established the Zongbing Yamen at Qingdao Harbor and assumed responsibility for both military and civil administration in the Qingdao area.

Name	Portrait	Place of birth	Time in office	Rank and concurrent posts	Notes and sources
Zhang Gaoyuan		Anhui Hefei	August 1892 – November 14, 1897	Second-rank garrison commander of Dengzhou	After the outbreak of the First Sino-Japanese War in July 1894, Zhang Gaoyuan was ordered to lead his troops to Gaiping County in Fengtian Province to participate in the war, and returned to garrison Jiaozhou in the winter of 1895.

== German occupation and lease period ==
On 14 November 1897, the German East Asia Squadron of the Imperial German Navy, under the command of Otto von Diederichs, occupied Qingdao during the occupation of Jiaozhou Bay and placed the area under military administration.

On 11 February 1898, Oskar von Truppel, captain of the protected cruiser SMS Prinzess Wilhelm, was temporarily appointed commander of the German forces stationed in Kiautschou.

Name	Portrait	Place of birth	Term of office	Rank and concurrent posts	Notes and sources
Otto von Diederichs		Minden, Germany	November 14, 1897 – January 1898	Rear Admiral, Commander of the East Asia Squadron (Germany)	
Oskar von Truppel		Katzhütte, Germany	February 11, 1898 – April 15, 1898	Lieutenant Commander of the Navy; Captain of the protected cruiser SMS Kaiserin Augusta	The Commander of the German forces stationed in Jiaozhou held a temporary appointment.

=== Governors of Jiaozhou Bay ===
On 6 March 1898, the German Empire and the Qing Empire signed the Jiaozhou Bay Lease Treaty, under which the Qingdao area became a German-leased territory. The Imperial German Navy established the Kiaochow Governorate as the highest administrative institution of the leased territory, and the Governor of Kiaochow exercised military and administrative authority over the territory. On 15 April of the same year, the first Governor of Kiaochow, Carl Ebbe Ludwig Rosendahl, assumed office.

Name	Portrait	Place of birth	Term of office	Rank and concurrent posts	Notes and sources
Carl Ebbe Ludwig Rosendahl		DenmarkCopenhagen	April 15, 1898 – February 11, 1899	Naval Captain	
Paul Jaeschke		Wrocław Germany （now part of Poland）	February 1899 – January 27, 1901	Naval Captain	Appointed on 10 October 1898 and assumed office in February 1899. Sources differ on his date of arrival, giving 18 February, 19 February, or 20 February. He died while in office.
Max Rollmann （acting）		Stralsund Germany	January 1901 – June 7, 1901	Navy Lieutenant Colonel	Former captain of the SMS Gefion cruiser。
Oskar von Truppel		Katschott Germany	June 7, 1901 – May 14, 1911	Naval Captain; promoted to Rear Admiral on 3 April 1905, to Vice Admiral on 17 September 1907, and to Admiral on 27 January 1911.	
Ernst van Semmern （acting）		Germany Wernigerode	February 11, 1905 – August 21, 1906	Naval Captain	Acted in the post during Alfred Meyer-Waldeck's leave in Germany; recorded in the Qingdao Gazetteer as “Wangran Meilong”.
Alfred Meyer-Waldeck （acting）		Saint Petersburg Russia	April 6, 1909 – April 2, 1910	Naval Captain，Chief of Staff of the German forces in the Jiaozhou Bay Leased Territory	Acted in the post during Alfred Meyer-Waldeck's leave in Germany.
Wilhelm Höpfner （acting）		Unknown	May 1911 – November 1911	Naval Captain， Chief of Staff of the German forces in the Jiaozhou Bay Leased Territory	Recorded in the Qingdao Gazetteer as “Heinaier”. 。
Alfred Meyer-Waldeck		Saint Petersburg Russia	November 22, 1911 – November 7, 1914	Naval Captain	

== First Japanese occupation period ==
After the outbreak of World War I in 1914, Japanese and British forces besieged Qingdao. On 7 November, Governor of Kiaochow Alfred Meyer-Waldeck surrendered with the defending forces, and on 16 November, Japanese forces completed their occupation of the Qingdao area. On 27 November, Emperor Taishō ordered the establishment of the Qingdao Garrison. Kamio Mitsuomi, commander of the 18th Division, the principal Japanese force during the Siege of Tsingtao, was appointed commander of the Qingdao Garrison and exercised authority over both military and civil administration in the occupied territory. The following individuals served as commanders of the Qingdao Garrison.

Name	Portrait	Place of birth	Term of office	Rank and concurrent posts	Notes and references
Kamio Mitsuomi		Japan, Nagano Prefecture	27 November 1914 – 24 May 1915	Lieutenant General	
Ōtani Kikuzō		Japan, Fukui Prefecture	24 May 1915 – 6 August 1917	Lieutenant General; promoted to General on 16 November 1916	
Hongō Fusatarō		Japan, Hyōgo Prefecture	6 August 1917 – 10 October 1918	Lieutenant General; promoted to General on 2 July 1918	
Ōshima Ken'ichi		Japan, Gifu Prefecture	10 October 1918 – May 1919	Lieutenant General	
Yui Mitsue		Japan, Kōchi Prefecture	28 May 1919 – 10 December 1922	Lieutenant General; promoted to General on 25 November 1919	Sovereignty over Qingdao was returned to China on 10 December 1922. The Qingdao Garrison was abolished on 15 December 1922.

== Beiyang government period ==
=== Superintendent of the Jiaozhou Commercial Port ===
On 4 February 1922, the governments of China and Japan signed the Treaty on the Settlement of the Shandong Question, which provided for the return of sovereignty over Qingdao to China. On 10 December of the same year, the Beiyang government formally resumed sovereignty over Qingdao. On the same day, it established the Jiaozhou Commercial Port Superintendent's Office as the highest administrative authority of Qingdao (the Jiaozhou Commercial Port), directly subordinate to the Beiyang government, and appointed the Governor of Shandong Province, Xiong Bingqi, to concurrently serve as Superintendent of the Jiaozhou Commercial Port.

Name	Portrait	Place of birth	Term of office	Rank and concurrent posts	Notes and references
Xiong Bingqi		Shandong, Jining	10 December 1922 – April 1924	Governor of Shandong Province	
Gao Enhong		Shandong, Penglai	April 1924 – 5 November 1924		Appointed on 31 March 1924.
Wang Hanzhang (acting)		Zhili, Qingyuan	5 November 1924 – 15 November 1924	Brigade Commander of the 10th Brigade, 5th Division, Beiyang Army; Commander of the Qingdao Martial Law Headquarters	
Wen Shude		Shandong, Yidu	15 November 1924 – April 1925	Commander of the Bohai Fleet	

=== Director-General of the Jiaozhou Commercial Port Bureau ===
In July 1925, Zhang Zongchang, Military Governor of Shandong, reorganized the Jiaozhou Commercial Port Superintendent's Office as the Jiaozhou Commercial Port Bureau and placed it under the jurisdiction of Shandong Province, appointing Zhao Qi as Director-General of the Jiaozhou Commercial Port Bureau.

Name	Portrait	Place of birth	Term of office	Rank and concurrent posts	Notes and references
Zhao Qi		Shandong, Yexian	25 July 1925 – 15 April 1929		

== First period of rule under the Nationalist Government in Nanjing ==
=== Qingdao Takeover Commissioner ===
In November 1928, the Nationalist Government appointed Chen Zhongfu as Qingdao Takeover Commissioner. After arriving in Qingdao in December, Chen was unable to take over the city because it remained under the control of Japanese garrison forces. On 28 March 1929, the Nationalist Government and Japan signed the Sino-Japanese Jinan Agreement, under which Japan agreed to withdraw its troops. On 4 April, Chen returned to Qingdao. On 13 April, the Japanese Consul-General in Qingdao agreed to the Nationalist Government's takeover of Qingdao. On 15 April, Wu Siyu, Commander of the Qingdao Gendarmerie, arrived in Qingdao with his headquarters and the 2nd Gendarmerie Regiment. On the same day, Chen Zhongfu and the Office of the Qingdao Takeover Commissioner formally took over the city.

Name	Portrait	Place of birth	Term of office	Rank and concurrent posts	Notes and references
Chen Zhongfu		Jiangsu, Wu County	15 April 1929 – July 1929		

=== Mayor of the Qingdao (Special) Municipal Government ===
On 20 April 1929, the Nationalist Government declared Qingdao a special municipality directly under the jurisdiction of the Executive Yuan. On 28 June, Ma Fuxiang was appointed mayor of the Qingdao Special Municipality; however, as he did not assume office, Wu Siyu served as acting mayor. On 2 July, the Office of the Qingdao Takeover Commissioner was reorganized as the Qingdao Special Municipal Government. In 1930, the Nationalist Government abolished the Organic Law of Special Municipalities and reclassified special municipalities as municipalities under the Executive Yuan. On 15 September of the same year, the Qingdao Special Municipal Government was renamed the Qingdao Municipal Government.

Name	Portrait	Place of birth	Term of office	Rank and concurrent posts	Notes and references
Wu Siyu (acting)		Zhejiang, Jiaxing	2 July 1929 – 11 November 1929	Lieutenant General of the National Revolutionary Army, Commander of the Qingdao Special Municipal Gendarmerie, Supervisory Committee Member of the Qingdao Special Municipal Party Headquarters of the Kuomintang	
Ma Fuxiang		Gansu, Hezhou	11 November 1929 – 10 March 1930		
Ge Jingen		Zhejiang, Jiaxing	10 March 1930 – September 1930		Resigned on 19 June 1930.
Hu Ruoyu		Anhui, Hefei	8 September 1930 – December 1931 (Note: Hu was reportedly absent from Qingdao for extended periods during his tenure, frequently staying in Beiping and Shanghai. The Qingdao Gazetteer records that he left office in December 1931, with Shen Honglie serving as acting mayor from 17 December. Hu was formally removed from office on 21 January 1932, when Shen officially succeeded him.)	Acting Mayor of Beiping from 1931	Appointed on 23 June 1930; removed from office on 21 January 1932.
Shen Honglie		Hubei, Tianmen	17 December 1931 – 21 January 1932 (acting); 21 January 1932 – 31 December 1937	Commander-in-Chief of the Northeastern Navy (resigned in 1933); after the Marco Polo Bridge Incident in 1937, concurrently Deputy Commander-in-Chief of the Third Army Group and Commander-in-Chief of Qingdao Land and Naval Forces	Evacuated Qingdao in December 1937. After becoming Chairman of Shandong Province in January 1938, he continued to nominally hold the office of Mayor of Qingdao until 1945.

== Second Japanese occupation period ==
=== Chairman of the Qingdao Public Security Maintenance Association ===
After the full-scale outbreak of the Second Sino-Japanese War in July 1937, Shen Honglie was ordered to evacuate Qingdao at the end of December together with the municipal government and naval forces. (Shen himself departed at dawn on 31 December.) On 10 January 1938, the Imperial Japanese Navy occupied Qingdao. On 17 January, it sponsored the establishment of the Qingdao Public Security Maintenance Association, with Zhao Qi, former Director-General of the Jiaozhou Commercial Port Bureau, serving as its chairman.

Name	Portrait	Place of birth	Term of office	Rank and concurrent posts	Notes and references
Zhao Qi		Shandong,Yexian	17 January 1938 – 10 January 1939		

=== Mayor of the Qingdao Special Municipal Office (Qingdao Special Municipal Government) ===
On 10 January 1939, the Qingdao Special Municipal Office was established under the Provisional Government of the Republic of China in Beijing, with Zhao Qi serving as mayor. In January 1940, after the Provisional Government of the Republic of China in Beijing merged with the Reformed Government of the Republic of China in Nanjing to form the National Government of the Republic of China (the Wang Jingwei regime), the former was reorganized as the North China Political Council, and the Qingdao Special Municipal Office remained under its jurisdiction. On 13 November 1943, the Qingdao Special Municipal Office was renamed the Qingdao Special Municipal Government.

Name	Portrait	Place of birth	Term of office	Rank and concurrent posts	Notes and references
Zhao Qi		Shandong, Yexian	10 January 1939 – 18 March 1943	Member of the Provisional Government of the Republic of China; from 1940, Member of the North China Political Council	
Yao Zuobin		Sichuan, Nanbu	18 March 1943 – September 1945		

== Second period of rule under the Nationalist Government in Nanjing ==
In March 1943, Li Xianliang, Secretary-General and Acting Mayor of the Qingdao Municipal Government as well as Commander of the Qingdao Security Corps, announced at Huayan Temple in Laoshan that the Qingdao Municipal Government had resumed operations, and subsequently conducted guerrilla warfare against Japanese forces and collaborationist troops.

After the Japanese surrender on 15 August 1945, the Nationalist Government in Chongqing formally appointed Li Xianliang as Mayor of Qingdao in mid-August (variously reported as 16 August or 18 August).

On 13 September, Li led the municipal government and the Security Corps into the urban area. On 17 September, they formally took over the Qingdao Special Municipal Government, and on the afternoon of 18 September, the Qingdao Municipal Government officially resumed operations.

The following individuals served as mayors of the Qingdao Municipal Government.

Name	Portrait	Place of birth	Term of office	Rank and concurrent posts	Notes and references
Li Xianliang		Jiangsu, Wu County	September 1945 – 2 August 1948	Commander of the Qingdao Security Command, (Note: The Qingdao Security Command was expanded from the Qingdao Security Corps. In January 1946 (or October 1945 according to another source), it was reorganized as the Qingdao Security Office, with Li Xianliang serving as its director. In March 1946, it was incorporated into the Qingdao Garrison Command.) Deputy Commander of the Qingdao Garrison Command, Director of the Qingdao Electoral Affairs Office of the Legislative Yuan	Served as acting mayor from March 1943 (alternatively reported as spring 1942 or January 1943) following the transfer of Shen Honglie to serve as Minister of Agriculture and Forestry. Removed from office on 21 July 1948 and formally handed over his duties on 2 August.
Gong Xuesui		Jiangxi, Jinxi	2 August 1948 – March 1949		Appointed on 21 July 1948 (or 22 July according to another source). Removed from office on 9 February 1949 (or resigned on 12 February according to another source).
Qin Dechun		Shandong, Yishui	11 March 1949 – 14 May 1949	Lieutenant General, Chairman of the Shandong Provincial Government (Note: By this time, Jinan, the provincial capital, had already been captured by the People's Liberation Army.)	Appointed in February 1949 and assumed office on 11 March. According to one account, he left Qingdao for Guangzhou after only eight days in office to serve as Vice Minister of National Defense. He resigned on 14 May 1949 (or 11 May according to another source).
Sun Jiding (acting)		Shandong, Penglai	14 May 1949 – June 1949	Secretary-General of the Qingdao Municipal Government; Director of the Qingdao Port Authority	

== Period of military control by the People’s Liberation Army and the People’s Republic of China ==
=== Mayor of the Qingdao Municipal People’s Government ===
In May 1949, the People's Liberation Army launched the Qingdao–Jimo Campaign, besieging Qingdao and Jimo. The Qingdao Municipal Government subsequently evacuated the city. On 2 June, the People's Liberation Army entered the urban area and assumed control of the entire municipality. On the same day, the Qingdao Municipal People's Government was established, with Ma Baosan appointed as mayor.

Name	Portrait	Place of birth	Term of office	Concurrent posts	Notes and references
Ma Baosan		Shandong, Shouguang	2 June 1949 – 21 March 1950	Member of the Qingdao Municipal Committee of the Chinese Communist Party; Member of the Qingdao Military Control Commission	
Xiang Ming		Shandong, Linqu	21 March 1950 – September 1950	Secretary of the Qingdao Municipal Committee of the Chinese Communist Party (until 2 July 1950)	Transferred to the Shandong Bureau of the Central Committee of the Chinese Communist Party on 2 July 1950.
Lai Keke		Guangdong, Dabu	September 1950 – June 1953	Secretary of the Qingdao Municipal Committee of the Chinese Communist Party (until 16 December 1952)	Elected the first Mayor of the Qingdao Municipal People's Government by the First Session of the Third Qingdao People's Representatives Conference, held from 4 to 12 September 1950. Re-elected for the second and third terms in October 1951 and November 1952, respectively. On 16 December 1952, he was transferred to serve as Second Deputy Secretary of the Shandong Bureau of the Central Committee of the Chinese Communist Party.
Wang Shaoyong		Hebei, Tangshan	June 1953 – April 1956	Second Deputy Secretary of the Qingdao Municipal Committee of the Chinese Communist Party; Secretary of the Qingdao Municipal Committee of the Chinese Communist Party (from December 1953); Chairman of the Qingdao Municipal Committee of the Chinese People's Political Consultative Conference (from May 1955)	Approved and appointed by the Central Committee of the Chinese Communist Party on 9 February 1953. Left office at the Third Session of the First Qingdao Municipal People's Congress, held from 2 to 7 April 1956.

=== Mayors of the Qingdao Municipal People's Committee ===
In April 1956, pursuant to the Organic Law of Local People's Congresses and Local People's Councils of the People's Republic of China, the Qingdao Municipal People's Government was renamed the Qingdao Municipal People's Committee, while the chief executive of the municipality continued to hold the title of mayor.

Name	Portrait	Place of birth	Term of office	Concurrent posts	Notes and references
Li Mu		Shandong, Penglai	April 1956 – October 1963	Member of the Standing Committee of the Qingdao Municipal Committee of the Chinese Communist Party; Secretary of the Secretariat of the Qingdao Municipal Committee of the Chinese Communist Party (from 5 November 1958)	Elected at the Third Session of the First Qingdao Municipal People's Congress, held from 2 to 7 April 1956. Re-elected in January 1957, June 1958, and May 1961. Left office at the First Session of the Fifth Qingdao Municipal People's Congress in October 1963.
Zhang Jingtao		Shandong, Zibo	October 1963 – April 1966	First Secretary of the Qingdao Municipal Committee of the Chinese Communist Party	Elected at the First Session of the Fifth Qingdao Municipal People's Congress in October 1963. Left office at the First Session of the Sixth Qingdao Municipal People's Congress, held from 14 to 19 April 1966.
Li Yuanrong		Shandong, Laiwu	April 1966 – 22 January 1967	Acting First Secretary of the Qingdao Municipal Committee of the Chinese Communist Party (from 31 August 1966)	Elected at the First Session of the Sixth Qingdao Municipal People's Congress, held from 14 to 19 April 1966. Left office on 22 January 1967 after the municipal government was seized by rebel factions during the Cultural Revolution.

=== Director of the Qingdao Revolutionary Committee ===
Following the outbreak of the Cultural Revolution, on 22 January 1967, rebel factions in Qingdao seized power from the Qingdao Municipal People's Committee and the Chinese Communist Party Qingdao Municipal Committee, establishing the "Qingdao Revolutionary Rebel Committee" (Chinese: 青岛市革命造反委员会). Its core leadership group was headed by former vice mayor Wang Xiaoyu and rebel leader Yang Baohua, among others. On 1 March, the body was renamed the Qingdao Revolutionary Committee. It was formally approved and established on 10 February 1968 by the Shandong Revolutionary Committee and the Jinan Military Region, with Yang Baohua serving as chairman of the Revolutionary Committee.

Name	Portrait	Place of birth	Term of office	Concurrent posts	Notes and references
Yang Baohua		Tianjin	10 February 1967 – 10 April 1971	Deputy Leader of the Core Leadership Group of the Qingdao Revolutionary Committee of the Chinese Communist Party (from 16 August 1969)	Some sources render his name as "Yang Baohua" (杨葆华). Formerly an industrial worker, he was one of the principal organizers of the "power seizure" on 22 January 1967 and subsequently became a member of the core leadership group of the Revolutionary Rebel Committee. All of his positions were revoked on 10 April 1971.
Yi Yaocai		Jiangxi, Taihe	10 April 1971 – 1 July 1972	Leader of the Core Leadership Group of the Qingdao Revolutionary Committee of the Chinese Communist Party; PLAN Rear Admiral (promoted in 1955)	
Ma Zhongquan		Hubei, Huang'an	1 July 1972 – 19 October 1973	Leader of the Core Leadership Group of the Qingdao Revolutionary Committee of the Chinese Communist Party; Commander of the North Sea Fleet; concurrently Deputy Commander of the People's Liberation Army Navy (from July 1973); PLAN Rear Admiral (promoted in 1955)	
Liu Zhongqian		Shandong, Laiwu	19 October 1973 – 12 January 1980	Leader of the Core Leadership Group of the Qingdao Revolutionary Committee of the Chinese Communist Party; Secretary of the Qingdao Municipal Committee of the Chinese Communist Party (from September 1975); Chairman of the Qingdao Municipal Committee of the Chinese People's Political Consultative Conference	Re-elected at the First Session of the Eighth Qingdao Municipal People's Congress, held from 24 to 28 July 1978. Removed from office on 12 January 1980 and transferred to the provincial government.
Li Bingzheng (acting)		Shandong, Tai'an	12 January 1980 – July 1980	Deputy Secretary of the Qingdao Municipal Committee of the Chinese Communist Party; Secretary of the Qingdao Municipal Committee of the Chinese Communist Party (from August 1982) (Note: At the time, the highest-ranking official of a municipal CCP committee held the title of First Secretary.)	Elected mayor at the Second Session of the Eighth Qingdao Municipal People's Congress, held from 20 to 24 July 1980. Served as Chairman of the Standing Committee of the Ninth Qingdao Municipal People's Congress from 4 to 10 April 1983.

=== Mayor of the Qingdao Municipal People’s Government (reestablished) ===
Following the end of the Cultural Revolution, the Qingdao Municipal People's Government was re-established in July 1980 pursuant to the Organic Law of Local People's Congresses and Local People's Governments of the People's Republic of China, and has remained in operation ever since.

Name	Portrait	Place of Birth	Term of Office	Rank and Concurrent Positions	Notes and Sources
Li Bingzheng		Tai'an, Shandong	July 1980 – April 1983	See above	
Zang Kun		Wulian, Shandong	April 1983 – June 1986	Deputy Secretary of the CPC Qingdao Municipal Committee	Elected mayor at the 9th Qingdao Municipal People's Congress held from 4 to 10 April 1983; left office at the 4th session of the 9th Municipal People's Congress held from 3 to 8 June 1986.
Guo Songnian		Tianjin	June 1986 – September 1989	Deputy Secretary of the CPC Qingdao Municipal Committee	Elected at the 4th session of the 9th Qingdao Municipal People's Congress held from 3 to 8 June 1986; re-elected at the 1st session of the 10th Municipal People's Congress held from 6 to 12 January 1988; resigned at the 12th meeting of the Standing Committee of the 10th Municipal People's Congress held from 20 to 22 September 1989.
Yu Zhengsheng		Yan'an, Shaanxi	22 September 1989 – March 1990 (acting); March 1990 – 25 November 1994	Deputy Secretary of the CPC Qingdao Municipal Committee; from March 1992, Secretary of the CPC Qingdao Municipal Committee	Appointed acting mayor at the 12th meeting of the Standing Committee of the 10th Qingdao Municipal People's Congress held from 20 to 22 September 1989; elected mayor at the 3rd session of the 10th Municipal People's Congress held from 12 to 17 March 1990; resigned at the 14th meeting of the Standing Committee of the 11th Municipal People's Congress on 25 November 1994.
Qin Jiahao		Ningbo, Zhejiang	25 November 1994 – March 1995 (acting); March 1995 – February 1998	Deputy Secretary of the CPC Qingdao Municipal Committee	Appointed acting mayor by the 14th meeting of the Standing Committee of the 11th Qingdao Municipal People's Congress on 25 November 1994; elected mayor at the 3rd session of the 11th Municipal People's Congress held from 23 to 28 March 1995; left office at the 1st session of the 12th Municipal People's Congress held from 19 to 27 February 1998.
Wang Jiarui		Linyu, Hebei	February 1998 – 19 October 2000	Deputy Secretary of the CPC Qingdao Municipal Committee (removed from post in September 2000)	Elected at the 1st session of the 12th Qingdao Municipal People's Congress held from 19 to 27 February 1998; resigned at the 22nd meeting of the Standing Committee of the 12th Municipal People's Congress on 19 October 2000.
Du Shicheng		Huang County, Shandong	October 2000 – February 2001 (acting); February 2001 – January 2003	Deputy Secretary of the CPC Qingdao Municipal Committee; Secretary of the CPC Qingdao Municipal Committee from June 2002	
Xia Geng		Wuchang, Heilongjiang	7 January 2003 – February 2003 (acting); February 2003 – 21 January 2012	Deputy Secretary of the CPC Qingdao Municipal Committee	Appointed acting mayor by the 39th meeting of the Standing Committee of the 12th Qingdao Municipal People's Congress on 7 January 2003; elected mayor at the 1st session of the 13th Municipal People's Congress held from 19 to 26 February 2003; resigned at the 35th meeting of the Standing Committee of the 14th Municipal People's Congress on 21 January 2012.
Zhang Xinqi		Rongcheng, Shandong	21 January 2012 – March 2012 (acting); March 2012 – 16 February 2017	Deputy Secretary of the CPC Qingdao Municipal Committee	Appointed vice mayor and acting mayor by the 35th meeting of the Standing Committee of the 14th Qingdao Municipal People's Congress on 21 January 2012; elected mayor at the 1st session of the 15th Municipal People's Congress held from 25 to 30 March 2012; resigned at the 41st meeting of the Standing Committee of the 15th Municipal People's Congress on 16 February 2017.
Meng Fanli		Linyi, Shandong	27 March 2017 – April 2017 (acting); April 2017 – November 2020	Deputy Secretary of the CPC Qingdao Municipal Committee	Appointed vice mayor and acting mayor by the 42nd meeting of the Standing Committee of the 15th Qingdao Municipal People's Congress on 27 March 2017; elected mayor at the 1st session of the 16th Municipal People's Congress held from 15 to 20 April 2017; resigned at the 27th meeting of the Standing Committee of the 16th Municipal People's Congress on 18 November 2020.
Zhao Haozhi		Dongming, Shandong	3 December 2020 – January 2021 (acting); January 2021 – January 2025	Deputy Secretary of the CPC Qingdao Municipal Committee	Appointed vice mayor and acting mayor by the 28th meeting of the Standing Committee of the 16th Qingdao Municipal People's Congress on 3 December 2020; elected mayor at the 5th session of the 16th Municipal People's Congress held from 12 to 15 January 2021; resigned at the 23rd meeting of the Standing Committee of the 17th Municipal People's Congress on 17 January 2025.
Ren Gang		Taiqian, Henan	17 January 2025 – 11 February 2025 (acting); 11 February 2025 – incumbent	Deputy Secretary of the CPC Qingdao Municipal Committee	Appointed vice mayor and acting mayor by the 23rd meeting of the Standing Committee of the 17th Qingdao Municipal People's Congress on 17 January 2025; elected mayor at the 4th session of the 17th Municipal People's Congress on 11 February 2025.
