= Japanese intervention in Siberia =

Dispatch of Japanese military forces to the Russian Far East

- Part of the Russian Civil War
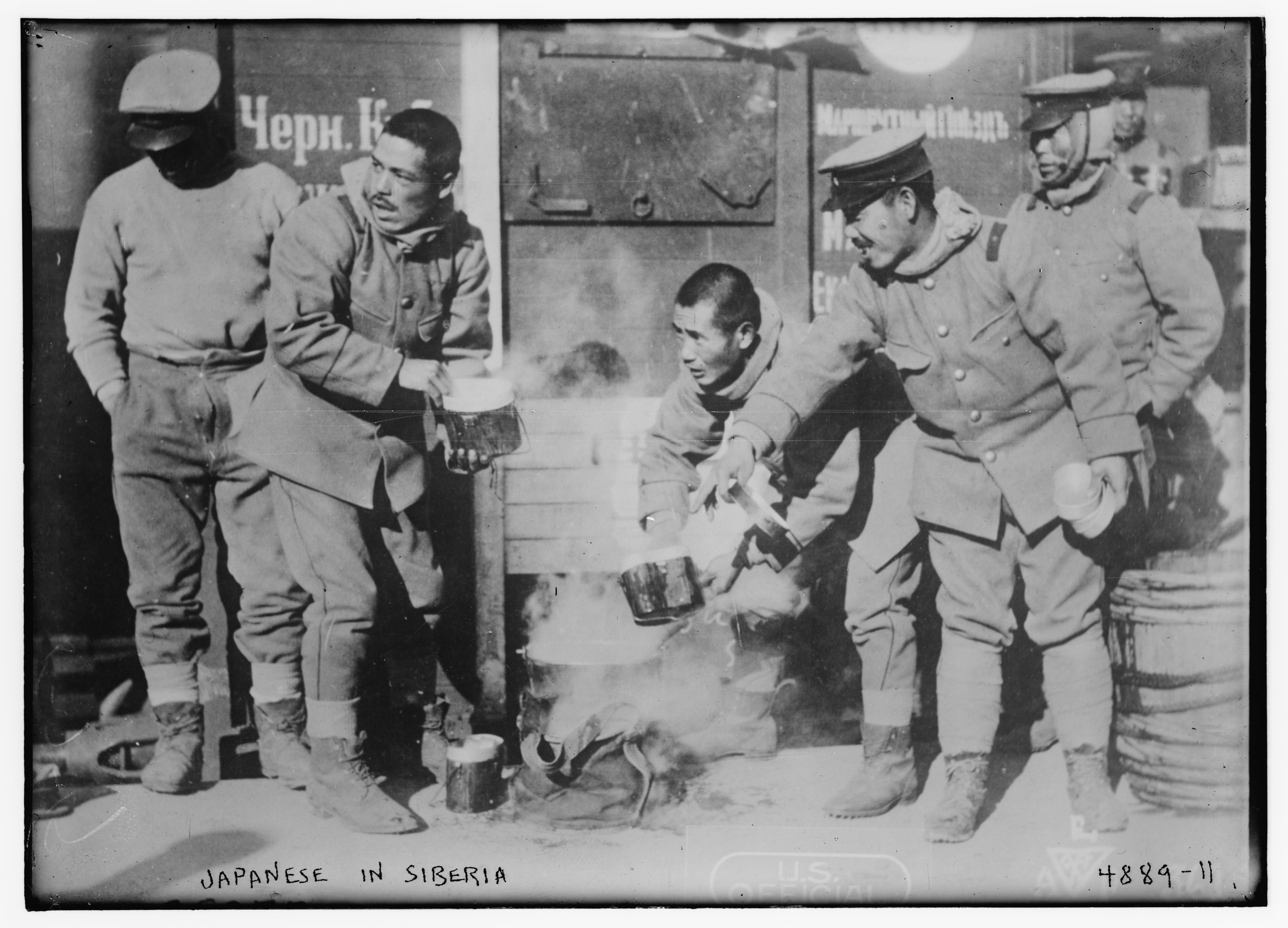
- Japanese soldiers in Siberia
Date	12 January 1918 – 24 June 1922 (4 years, 5 months, 1 week and 5 days)
Location	Russian Far East
Result	Japanese withdrawal
Territorial changes	Japanese withdraw from most occupied territories following internal political pressure; Japan occupies northern Sakhalin until 1925

Belligerents
Russian SFSR: Far Eastern Republic	Empire of Japan (Russia) White movement

Commanders and leaders
(Russian Soviet Federative Socialist Republic) Leon Trotsky (Russian Soviet Federative Socialist Republic) Jukums Vacietis (Russian Soviet Federative Socialist Republic) Sergey Kamenev (Far Eastern Republic) A. Krasnoshchyokov	(Empire of Japan) Yui Mitsue (Empire of Japan) Otani Kikuzo (Russia) Grigory Semyonov

Strength
600,000 (peak)	70,000 (total)

Casualties and losses
7,791 casualties (1922 only): 698 killed or missing in action; 2,189 died of disease; 1,421 wounded; 3,482 sick and frostbitten	3,116 deaths (total): 1,399 killed; 1,717 died of disease

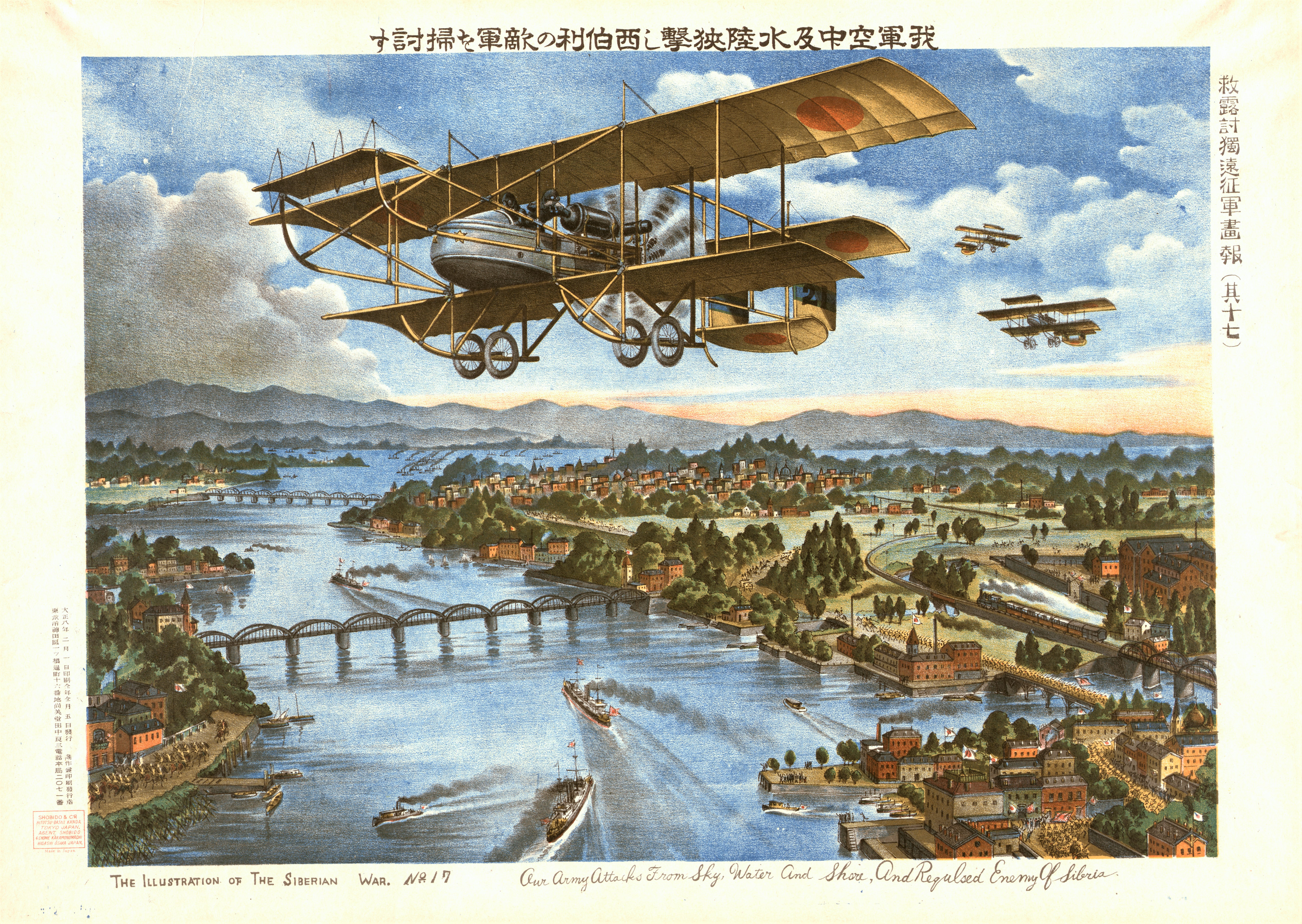
A Japanese propaganda lithograph rallying for occupation of the Russian Far East.

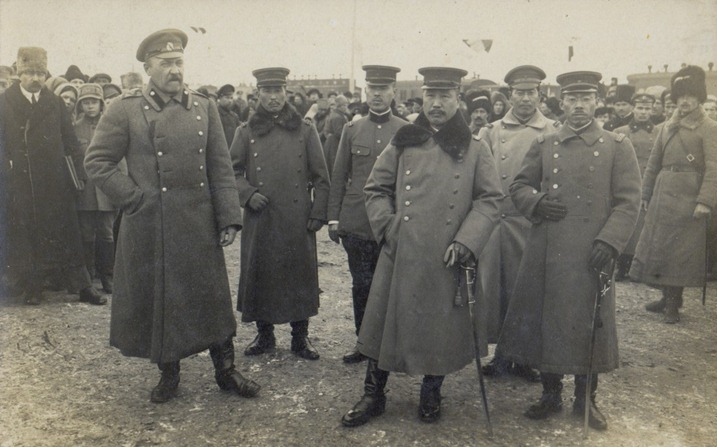
Japanese officers in Vladivostok with local commander Lieutenant General Rozanov (1920).

The Japanese Siberian Intervention (シベリア出兵, Shiberia Shuppei) of 1918–1922 was an invasion by the Japanese military forces on the Russian Maritime Provinces, as part of a pretext by larger effort by western powers and Japan to support White Russian forces against the Bolshevik Red Army during the Russian Civil War. The Japanese suffered 1,399 killed and another 1,717 deaths from disease. Japanese military forces occupied Russian cities (largest city Vladivostok) and towns in the province of Primorsky Krai between 1918 and 1922.

== Background ==
On 23 August 1914, the Empire of Japan declared war on Germany, in part due to the Anglo-Japanese Alliance, and Japan became a member of the Entente powers. The Imperial Japanese Navy made a considerable contribution to the Allied war effort; however, the Imperial Japanese Army was more sympathetic to Germany, and aside from the seizure of Qingdao, resisted attempts to become involved in combat. Tsar Nicholas II was overthrown in February 1917. The new Bolshevik government signed a separate armistice with the Axis powers in December 1917, followed by a treaty of peace with the German Empire in March 1918, a move that antagonised Britain which was pressuring the new Bolshevik authorities to continue the war effort. The anti-Bolshevik White movement retreated to the Russian Far East, and in September 1918, declared an anti-Bolshevik Russian State based in Ufa with considerable military presence in Siberia. The spread of the anti-monarchist Bolshevik revolution eastward was of great concern to the Japanese government. Vladivostok, facing the Sea of Japan, was a major port with a massive stockpile of military stores and a large foreign merchant community.

=== Japanese participation ===
The Japanese were initially asked by the French in 1917 to intervene in Russia but declined. However, in February 1918, a "Siberia Planning Committee" was formed by the Imperial Japanese Army General Staff and the Army Ministry with the aim of exploring the possibility that the Tsarist collapse was an opportunity to free Japan from any future threat from Russia by detaching Siberia and forming an independent buffer state. The Army proposed attacking on two fronts, from Vladivostok to Khabarovsk along the Amur River and also via the Chinese Eastern Railway to cut off the Russian Trans-Siberian Railway at Lake Baikal. The Japanese government, then under the civilian leadership of Prime Minister Hara Takashi, rejected the plan.

In late 1917, the Japanese government was alarmed to find that the British government, despite the Anglo-Japanese Alliance, had approached the United States about a possible joint intervention at Vladivostok without consulting Japan. In December 1917, the British agreed that such a force should include Japan, but before the details could be worked out, the British ordered HMS Suffolk from Hong Kong to Vladivostok. Japanese Prime Minister Terauchi Masatake was outraged and ordered the Imperial Japanese Navy to reach Vladivostok first. The task was assigned to Rear Admiral Katō Kanji with the battleships Iwami and Asahi. With crews working day-and-night over the new year holidays, Iwami was able to depart from Kure Naval District on 9 January 1918, and arrived at Vladivostok on January 12, only two days before HMS Suffolk. Asahi arrived on 17 January, and became Katō's flagship. USS Brooklyn, which had been stationed at Vladivostok until December 1917, returned on March 1.

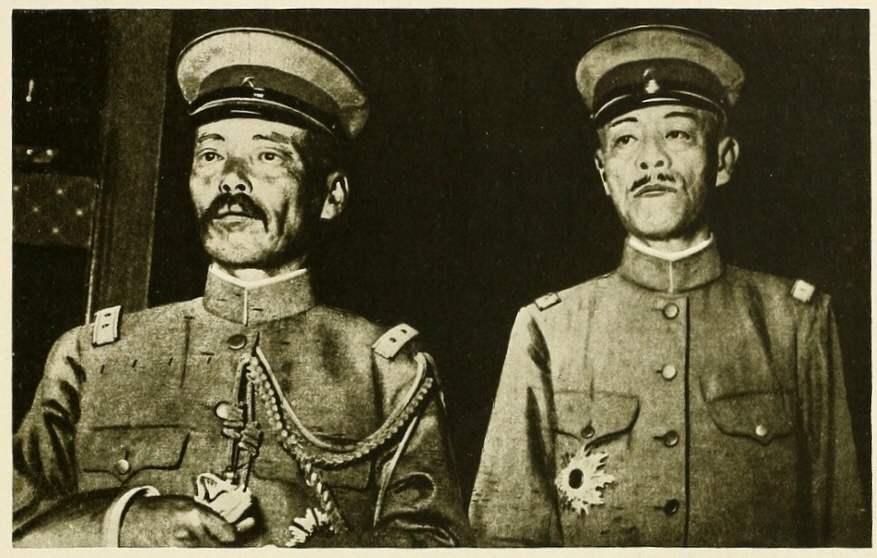
Lieutenant General Mitsue Yui and General Kikuzo Otani, the leaders of the Japanese forces in Siberia

It was the original intent that this show of force by Allied warships would enhance the confidence of the local anti-Bolshevik forces and help restore public order; however, this proved to be overly optimistic. After an armed mob looted a Japanese-owned store, killing its owner, the Japanese government, without waiting for an investigation of the murder, permitted the landing of marines, who proceeded to occupy the entire city. The British also landed 100 Royal Marines to protect their consulate, but the Americans took no action. In July 1918, President Wilson asked the Japanese government to supply 7,000 troops as part of an international coalition of 25,000 troops, including an American expeditionary force, planned to support the rescue of the Czechoslovak Legion and securing of wartime supplies stockpiled at Vladivostok. After heated debate in the Diet, the administration of Prime Minister Terauchi agreed to send 12,000 troops, but under the command of Japan, rather than as part of an international coalition.

Once the political decision had been reached, the Imperial Japanese Army took over full control under Chief of Staff Yui Mitsue and extensive planning for the expedition was conducted. The Japanese eventually deployed 70,000 troops under the command of General Kikuzo Otani – far more than any of the other Allied powers had anticipated. Furthermore, although the Allies had envisioned operations only in the vicinity of Vladivostok, within months Japanese forces had penetrated as far west as Lake Baikal and Buryatia, and by 1920, zaibatsu such as Mitsubishi, Mitsui and others had opened offices in Vladivostok, Khabarovsk, Nikolayevsk-on-Amur and Chita, bringing with them over 50,000 civilian settlers.

After the international coalition withdrew its forces, the Japanese Army stayed on. However, political opposition prevented the Army from annexing the resource-rich region. Japan continued to support White Movement leader Admiral Aleksandr Kolchak until his defeat and capture in 1920, and also supported the regime of Ataman Semenov, who they intended to take control under the planned buffer state but whose unstable government collapsed by 1922. In March and April 1922, the Japanese Army repelled large Bolshevik offensives against Vladivostok. On 24 June 1922, Japan announced that it would unilaterally withdraw from all of Russian territory by October, with the last Japanese soldiers leaving Vladivostok on 25 October 1922.

The exception to this withdrawal was northern Sakhalin island, bordering Karafuto Prefecture. The Russian half of the island had been occupied in retaliation for the Nikolayevsk incident of 1920. On 20 January 1925, the Soviet–Japanese Basic Convention was signed in Beijing. Following this agreement, Japan withdrew the Sakhalin Province Expeditionary Army from northern Sakhalin by 15 May 1925.

== Effects on Japanese politics ==
Japan's motives in the Siberian intervention were complex and poorly articulated. Overtly, Japan (as with the United States and the other international coalition forces) was in Siberia to safeguard stockpiled military supplies and to rescue the Czechoslovak Legion. However, the Japanese government's antipathy to communism and socialism, a determination to recoup historical losses to Russia, and the perceived opportunity to settle the "northern problem" to Japan's advantage by either creating a buffer state or through outright territorial acquisition were also factors. However, patronage of various White Movement leaders left Japan in a poor diplomatic position vis-à-vis the government of the Soviet Union, after the Red Army eventually emerged victorious from the Russian Civil War. The intervention tore Japan's wartime unity to shreds, leading to the army and government being involved in bitter controversy and renewed faction strife in the army itself. The official conduct of the Siberian Intervention was later bitterly attacked in the Japanese Diet, with the Army being accused of grossly misrepresenting the size of the forces sent, misappropriating secret funds, and supporting figures such as lieutenant general Roman von Ungern-Sternberg, rumors of whose atrocities had reached the press.

== See also ==
- List of states and regions involved in the Russian Civil War
- Bibliography of the Russian Revolution and Civil War
- Outline of the Russian Revolution and Civil War
- Swedish volunteers in Persia
- Evgenevka incident
