= Evgenevka incident =

Part of the Allied intervention in the Russian Civil War

- Part of Allied intervention in the Russian Civil War and the Japanese intervention in Siberia
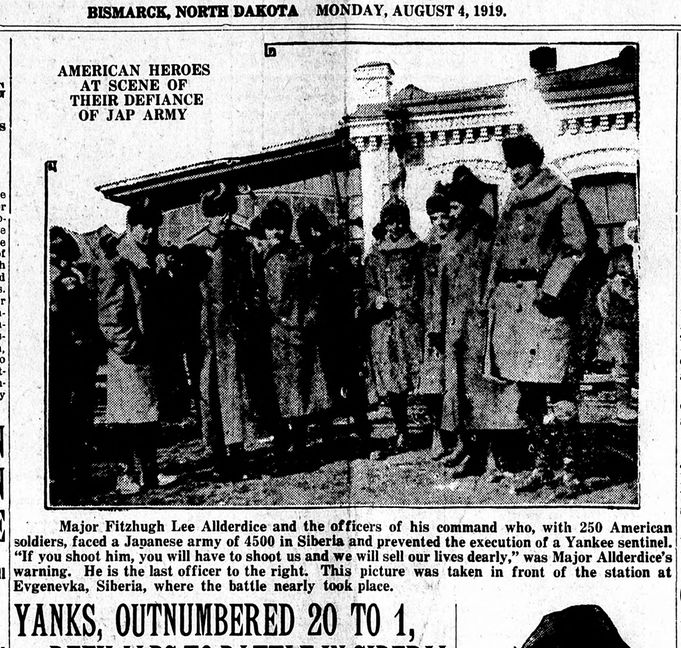
- August 4, 1919, Bismarck Tribune News Coverage of the Evgenevka incident
- Date: August 1919
- Location: Evgenevka, Siberia
- Caused by: Misunderstanding between 27th Infantry Regiment and Japanese Unit
- Methods: Bayonet and sword attacks

Parties
| 27th Infantry Reg (Wolfhounds) - United States Army | Japan Japanese Military in Siberia |

Number
| ~250 | ~4,500 |

Casualties and losses
| | 2 wounded |

The Evgenevka incident was an armed standoff between the American 27th Infantry Regiment (Wolfhounds) and the Japanese Military in Evgenevka, Siberia during the Allied intervention in the Russian Civil War.

== Background ==
The Allied intervention in the Russian Civil War consisted of a series of multi-national military expeditions in 1918. The stated goals were to help the Czechoslovak Legion, to secure supplies of munitions and armaments in Russian ports, and to re-establish the Eastern Front but after the Bolshevik government withdrew from World War I, the Allied Powers openly backed the anti-communist White forces in Russia. Allied efforts were hampered by divided objectives, war-weariness from the overall global conflict, and a lack of domestic support. These factors, together with the evacuation of the Czechoslovak Legion, compelled the Allied Powers to withdraw from North Russia and Siberia in 1920, though Japanese forces occupied parts of Siberia until 1922 and the northern half of Sakhalin until 1925.

== Incident ==
An American unit of the 27th Infantry Regiment was based at Evgenevka, a station on the Trans-Siberian Railway. An American sentry, known as Private "Little" Smith, was guarding a portion of the station when a Japanese unit was disembarking from the train. One of the Japanese soldiers tried to pass into the American section but was blocked by Smith. The Japanese soldier, angered by Smith's refusal, smacked the American across the head with his canteen strap. In response, Smith raised his gun to fire but his rifle jammed and so he stabbed the Japanese soldier in the neck with his bayonet.

After their soldier was wounded the Japanese unit seized Smith and threatened to execute him. Alerted by American soldiers, the commander of the American 27th Infantry Regiment, Major Fitzhugh Lee Allderdice, mobilized all 250 men under his command and marched to the station to free Smith. When they arrived at the station, a Japanese captain tried to stab an American but the blow was blocked by his heavy sheepskin jacket. Major T. Airi, the commander of the Japanese, then arrived and started negotiating with Allderdice. When the Japanese captain became enraged, he lunged at the Americans again but Major Airi blocked the blow with his body, receiving a wound on his shoulder. The Americans drew their guns and Allderdice spoke through the translator stating that, "Very well, if you shoot an American soldier tonight you'll have to annihilate my command. You know what that means - we - are outnumbered 20 to 1, but we'll sell our lives dearly." When the Japanese captain still refused to listen and raised his sword, Allderdice stated, "If you want war with the United States you'll get it if you raise your hand against this command."

Smith was eventually freed after it was agreed that the Americans would salute the Japanese officers in the station.

== Iman incident ==
On October 1, 1919, it was reported that another incident almost led to a confrontation between Japanese and American forces. Two American officers, Captain L. P. Johns of the 27th and Corporal Benjamin Sperling of the 31st, were arrested by Anti-Bolshevik forces under the command of General Rozanov, in Iman, Russia. They were seized by the Russians for not having passports. Captain Johns was able to escape to alert his superiors. An American force quickly arrived and attempted to free him but the Russians refused and the local Japanese forces backed the Russians and said that if fighting broke out between the Americans and the Russians, the Japanese would back the Russians. Eventually it was discovered that Sperling had been moved to General Kalmykov's HQs and that he would be freed. When Sperling returned to the American base it was revealed that he had been flogged during his captivity. On October 9, 1919, the White Russians offered an official apology for Sperling's flogging.

== Bibliography ==
Notes

References

- Beyer, Rick (2013). The Greatest War Stories Never Told: 100 Tales from Military History to Astonish, Bewilder, and Stupefy. Harper Collins. ISBN 9780062310378. - Total pages: 224
- The Butte Daily Bulletin (October 1, 1919). "US Soldier Flogged". The Butte Daily Bulletin. Butte, Silver Bow, Montana: Bulletin Pub. pp. 1–6. ISSN 2372-2916. OCLC 9696223.
- East Oregonian (October 9, 1919). "American Corporal Flogged in Siberia". East Oregonian : E.O. Pendleton, Umatilla, Oregon: East Oregonian Pub. Co. pp. 1–12. ISSN 2333-1348. OCLC 17499195.
- Hull, Peggy (August 4, 1919). "Yanks, outnumbered 20 to 1, defy Japs to battle in Siberia". The Bismarck Tribune. Bismarck, North Dakota: Bismarck Tribune Co. pp. 1–8. ISSN 2330-5967. OCLC 11987205.
- Hull, Peggy (August 7, 1919a). "Yanks near battle with Japs in Siberia". The Seattle Star. Seattle, Washington: E.H. Wells & Co. ISSN 2159-5577. OCLC 17285351.
