= List of seaplane carriers of China =

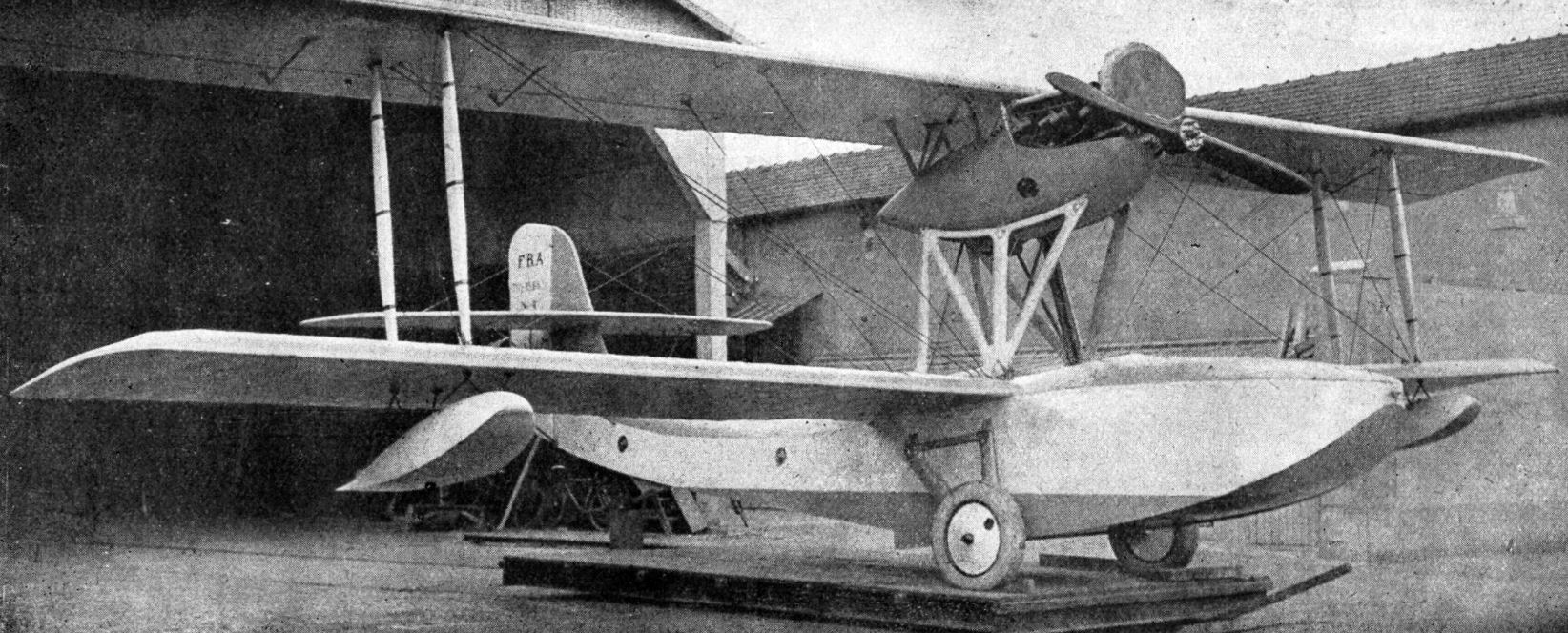
China's first adapted seaplane carrier, the Chen Hai in 1923, carried the French made FBA 19 seaplane

The list of seaplane carriers of China which includes all ships that have been used as seaplane carriers in the surface armed forces of various factions throughout Chinese history. The use of Chinese ships as seaplane carriers spans a period from 1923 to the final seaplane carrier in 1942.

The first ship to operate seaplanes in China was Chen Hai, a converted merchant ship of the Fengtian Navy. As a mainstay of the Fengtian Navy, it played a significant role in the Anti-Fengtian war in 1925. Later, under the leadership of Shen Honglie (沈鴻烈), an 8,000-ton German merchant ship was converted into the seaplane carrier Hwa Chia. Inspired by the Chen Hai, the Central Navy also converted two merchant ships ordered by Japanese merchants into seaplane carriers. After the outbreak of the full-scale War of Resistance against Japan, the Manchukuo naval forces, established with Japanese support, returning a destroyer gifted by Japan to a Japanese shipyard and converted it into the seaplane carrier Hai Wei. In addition, the transport ship Ding An was temporarily converted into a seaplane carrier during the 1930 campaign against the Fujian warlords. All these ships were either scuttled or sunk during the War of Resistance against Japan.

== History ==
In 1911, France began converting the minelayer Foudre by adding a hangar and crane between its third funnel and aft mast, eventually making it the world's first seaplane carrier. Later in 1913, the Japanese Navy began converting the captured British merchant ship HMS Lethington into the seaplane carrier Wakamiya. The conversion was completed in 1914, and this ship was then incorporated into the Japanese Second Fleet to participate in the battle of Qingdao, which was the world's first carrier-based air raid carried out by a naval vessel. The UK built several seaplane carriers before and after World War I, providing valuable experience for the development of aircraft carriers later.

In December 1916, the Beiyang government sent two naval officers, Chen Shaokuan and Zheng Liqing (鄭禮慶), to inspect the naval construction of various European countries. These two men boarded ships in Britain and personally witnessed the battlefield. During this period, Britain completed the conversion of HMS Hermes and then converted HMS Furious to make it the world's first true aircraft carrier with a flight deck. In July 1917, carrier-based aircraft launched from HMS Furious bombed German air bases, which left a deep impression on Chen Shaokuan. Chen Shaokuan returned to China in 1920. At this time, it was the period of warlordism and did not have the conditions to create a modern navy. In 1923, the Fengtian Navy under the warlord Zhang Zuolin purchased a merchant ship named Xiangli (祥利) from the Zhengji Shipping Company (政記輪船) in Yantai. Under the leadership of Shen Honglie, the ship was converted in July 1923 and carried the Schleck FBA 19 seaplane purchased from France in December 1924, becoming China's earliest seaplane carrier. In 1927, Shen Honglie converted the transport ship Hwa Chia (华甲) into a seaplane carrier. However, the ship was unusable due to excessive wear and tear and poor maintenance, and was transferred to Zhengji Shipping Company in 1929. Nisshin Kisen Kaisha, a Japanese shipping company, ordered two passenger ships on the Yangtze River from Jiangnan Shipyard in Shanghai, named Meitoku Maru (明徳丸) and Senjin Maru (宣仁丸) respectively. Before the two ships were completed, they were purchased by Wu Peifu and delivered in Wuchang in early 1924. At this time, the two ships were equipped with two 75 mm army howitzers according to Wu Peifu's requirements and renamed Jue Chuan (决川) and Jun Shu (浚蜀). Among them, the Jue Chuan was designated as the flagship of the newly established Yangtze River Fleet. With the Chen Hai being active in battle, these two ships were also converted into the seaplane carriers Wei Sheng and De Sheng capable of carrying a seaplane.

Following Zhang Xueliang's "Northeast Flag Replacement" in 1928, Chiang Kai-shek achieved nominal national unification. At that time, Chen Shaokuan, then Commander of the Second Fleet, submitted a naval expansion plan to the Nationalist Government that included a proposal for the construction of aircraft carriers. However, his proposal was not taken seriously and was rejected at the National Disbandment and Reorganization Conference; Chen resigned in protest. To appease him, Chiang Kai-shek promised to build three aircraft carriers and appointed him Minister of the Navy. As Chiang's promise was merely an expedient measure to placate Chen—with no substantial funding actually allocated for naval development—plans for Chinese aircraft carriers never materialized prior to the outbreak of the full-scale War of Resistance Against Japanese Aggression. During this period, following the Mukden Incident, Japan established a coastal police force in Northeast China under the command of Imperial Japanese Navy Reserve Captain Mitsutoshi Miyabe (宫部光利); the force's Yingkou Coastal Police Unit was led by the Japanese national Mototsugu Wakaki (若木元次). In 1936, Miyabe was transferred to serve as the Director of the Police Bureau of Heilongjiang Province in Manchukuo; to balance tensions between the Japanese Army and Navy, Wakaki—a Navy Reserve Captain with pro-Army leanings—succeeded him as commander of the coastal police force. Upon taking command, Wakaki leveraged his connections in May 1937 to secure the decommissioned Imperial Japanese Navy second-class destroyer Kashi, transferring it to the Manchukuo coastal police force and renaming it Hwa Wei. In 1937, the coastal police force was officially designated the "Maritime Police Force". The Hwa Wei was converted into a seaplane tender in 1938, carrying a single seaplane. In 1942, Hwa Wei, the largest warship of Manchukuo, was reincorporated into the Imperial Japanese Navy.

== Classification ==
Builder	Name of the ship's builder
Armament	The number and type of the primary armament
Aircraft	The number of aircraft carried by the vessel
Displacement	Ship displacement at full combat load (Note: Historian Erich Gröner states that full load was defined as "[equal to] type displacement plus full load fuel oil, diesel oil, coal, reserve boiler feed water, aircraft fuel, and special equipment.")
Propulsion	Number of shafts, type of propulsion system, and top speed generated
Cost	Cost of the ship's construction
Service	The dates work began and finished on the ship and its ultimate fate
Laid down	The date keel assembly was begun
Launched	The date the ship was launched
Commissioned	The date the ship was commissioned
Fate	Notes on what happened to the ship: sunk, scrapped, cancelled, sold or some other

Classifications for the same vessel vary across different documents and publications; furthermore, the classification of a single ship based on its function changed over time. The Chen Hai was originally a German naval transport; after being acquired by the Northeastern Navy, it was first converted into a training ship and later modified into a seaplane tender. The Hwa Chia was originally a merchant vessel; upon incorporation into the Northeastern Navy, it initially served as a training ship or transport before being converted into a seaplane tender in 1927, although some sources also classify it as an "amphibious assault ship". The De Sheng and Wei Sheng were not originally warships; after being commissioned into the navy, they underwent shipyard modifications to become gunboats and were subsequently reclassified as seaplane tenders following further refitting. The Hua Wei was originally the Imperial Japanese Navy destroyer Kashi; after being transferred to the Manchukuo Coast Guard, its torpedo tubes were removed to convert it into a coast guard vessel, and in 1938, it was further modified into an anti-submarine ship capable of carrying seaplanes—a role for which it is also categorized as a seaplane tender in some sources. The Ding An was originally a transport ship; it was only temporarily converted into a seaplane tender in 1930 for a campaign against Fujian warlords.

== Chen Hai ==
In August 1922, Zhang Zuolin established the Special Naval Police Department of the Northeast Security Command, which became the Fengtian Navy. Shen Honglie, who was appointed as the head of the department by Zhang Zuolin, prepared to purchase warships to build a coastal defense fleet. However, in May 1919, the United Kingdom and the United States, along with other military powers, announced a joint arms embargo against China in order to curb the expansion of influence of any single country on China. Therefore, Shen Honglie proposed to purchase old merchant ships to convert them into warships.

The Zhengji Shipping Company, established by Zhang Benzheng (張本政) in Yantai, expanded rapidly during World War I. While the business of this company declined after the war due to the global economic depression. In 1919, Zhang Zuolin lent Zhang Benzheng 300,000 Northeast Dollars to help the Yingkou Shipping Company he operated overcome difficulties, and later used the 300,000 Fengtian banknotes as an investment. From then until Zhang Zuolin's death, the Zhengji Shipping Company continued to distribute dividends to the Zhang family. In 1921, the Zhengji Shipping Company bought a merchant ship from the German Norddeutscher Lloyd for 145,000 taels and planned to put it on the transoceanic route. It was named Xiangli (祥利). The ship was originally named Manila and was completed on March 23, 1904, at the Bremen Rickmers shipyard in Germany. In 1923, the ship was purchased by the Northeast Naval Police and renamed Chen Hai as a training ship for the Huludao Naval Police School. In July of the same year, the ship underwent refitting, and the main deck between the forecastle, stern, and central building was converted into a seaplane platform. The refitting was completed on October 22.

For a long time afterward, the Zhenhai was the mainstay of the Fengtian Navy. In 1925, the ship and its wingman Wei Hai, joined the fight against the anti-Fengtian warlords. In November of the same year, the two ships launched surprise attacks on Wusongkou and Zhapu Port. As the Hai Chi joined the Northeast Coastal Defense Fleet, the Zhenhai gradually changed from a main combat warship to a dedicated seaplane operation ship. In 1927, the ship and the Haiqi sailed south to raid the heavily fortified Wusongkou of the National Revolutionary Army. After the Fujian Navy announced its support for the Northern Expeditionary Army, the Zhenhai was painted to resemble the merchant ship Dachang to deceive the enemy. After the Northeast Flag Replacement, the ship returned to the Huludao Naval Academy (formerly the Huludao Naval Police Academy) as a training ship. In June 1932, the Zhenhai, led by Zhang Yingqi, set sail from Qingdao with 50 teachers and students from the Naval Academy for a long-distance training voyage. During this period, the ship visited Taiwan, which was under Japanese occupation, becoming the first Chinese warship to visit Taiwan since the Qing government ceded Taiwan in the First Sino-Japanese War.

After the outbreak of the full-scale War of Resistance against Japan in 1937, Shen Honglie, then mayor of Qingdao, ordered the burning of all Japanese factories in the city on December 18 to implement a scorched earth strategy. On the same day, the Zhenhai was scuttled in the port of Qingdao.

Ship	Builder	Armament	Armor	Displacement	Propulsion	Cost	Service			
Ship	Builder	Armament	Armor	Displacement	Propulsion	Cost	Laid down	Launched	Commissioned	Fate
Chen Hai (镇海)	German Empire Bremen Shipyard	2 × 120 millimetres (4.7 in) (Note: Other source records it as "4.7 inches (119 mm)".)	3 FBA 3	2,708 t (2,665-long-ton)	1 reciprocating steam engine, 1,200 ihp (890 kW), 12 kn (22 km/h; 14 mph) (Note: Other sources record it as "10.8 knots (20.0 km/h; 12.4 mph)")	230,000 silver rounds	——	——	October 22, 1923	December 18, 1937, scuttled

== Hwa Chia ==
Following the outbreak of World War I, the Beiyang government formally declared war on Germany and Austria-Hungary on August 17, 1917. Subsequently, the Beiyang warlord navy confiscated more than 10 ships belonging to Germany and Austria-Hungary in China at the time. Among them, the merchant ship SS China (中國) of the Austro-Hungarian Österreichischer Lloyd was taken over, renamed Hwa Chia, and incorporated into the Bohai Fleet. The ship was built in 1900 by Wigham Richardson in UK. To operate these captured ships, the navy established a chartering supervision office, but it was soon abolished due to mismanagement. The Hwa Chia was then renamed Hwa An (華安). Shortly thereafter, the ship was incorporated into the Northeast Navy along with the Bohai Fleet. In 1927, the ship was converted into a special transport ship capable of carrying both army troops and eight seaplanes. Shortly after the Northeast Flag Replacement, the ship was leased by the Northeast Navy to the Zhengji Shipping Company as a merchant ship. After the outbreak of the full-scale War of Resistance against Japan in 1937, the Zhengji Shipping Company surrendered to Japan, and the ship was requisitioned by the Japanese Navy as a transport ship and renamed Yulin Maru. On January 21, 1945, the ship was sunk by US aircraft in Kaohsiung, Taiwan.

Ship	Builder	Armament	Armor	Displacement	Propulsion	Cost	Service			
Ship	Builder	Armament	Armor	Displacement	Propulsion	Cost	Laid down	Launched	Commissioned	Fate
Hwa Chia (華甲)	United Kingdom Wigham Richardson	1 × 75 millimetres (3 in)	8 FBA-19	8,160 t (8,031-long-ton)	12 kn (22 km/h; 14 mph)	——	——	March 14, 1900	March 14, 1917	Renamed as Da Zhonghua (大中華) in 1929Sunk in Kaohsiung, Taiwan on January 21, 1945.

== Wei Sheng class ==
Wei Sheng and De Sheng were originally built and launched by the Jiangnan Shipyard in 1922. In 1923, Masajiro Okano—an advisor to the Zhili clique warlord Wu Peifu—learned that two vessels named Ming De and Xuan Ren, then owned by the Nisshin Kisen Kaisha, were up for sale; he persuaded Wu Peifu, who was planning to purchase cargo ships at the time, to acquire them for 1.2 million silver rounds. After delivery at Niyutao in Wuhan, Wu Peifu renamed the ships Jue Chuan and Jun Shu—names signifying the "resolution of the Sichuan situation" and the "dredging and opening of the Bashu region," respectively. The two vessels were officially commissioned into service on January 25, 1924. At that time, they were armed with two 75 mm guns and two machine guns and were tasked with garrison duties and the transport of munitions between Wuchang and Yichang. That same year, Wu Peifu ordered the formation of the Upper Yangtze River Merchant-Protection Fleet with these two vessels as its core, designating the Jue Chuan as the flagship.

Following the collapse of Wu Peifu after the Second Zhili-Fengtian War, vessels of the Bohai Fleet that had originally belonged to the Zhili clique—including the Jue Chuan and Jun Shu—were transferred to the command of Sun Chuanfang. In 1927, when Yang Shuzhuang (楊樹莊) declared his allegiance to the Northern Expeditionary Army, Tang Shengzhi—amidst the chaos of the Ning-Han split—took these two ships to Wuhan to form the Yangtze River Fleet of the Fourth Group Army; the vessels were renamed Yong Xing (永興) and Wen Shu (文殊). During Tang Shaokuan's western campaign in 1928, the entire fleet was captured, and the two ships subsequently had their names restored to Jue Chuan and Jun Shu.

Influenced by the Zhen Hai, Tang Shaokuan sent the Jue Chuan and Jun Shu to the Jiangnan Shipyard to be converted into seaplane tenders. During the 1929 state funeral ceremony for the interment of Sun Yat-sen at the Sun Yat-sen Mausoleum in Nanjing, the Wei Sheng was selected to transport Sun's coffin across the Yangtze River. In 1933, the two ships were transferred to the Yangtze River Water Police, but were soon returned to the Navy. On August 12, 1937, acting on the recommendation of Ouyang Ge (歐陽格) and others, the two ships—along with several other naval vessels—were scuttled in the lower reaches of the Yangtze River, in the waters between Jiangyin and Jingjiang.

Ship	Builder	Armament	Armor	Displacement	Propulsion	Cost	Service			
Ship	Builder	Armament	Armor	Displacement	Propulsion	Cost	Laid down	Launched	Commissioned	Fate
Wei Sheng (威胜)	Republic of China Jiangnan Shipyard	1 × 120 mm (5 in)	1 seaplane (Note: Other sources indicate that it can carry two seaplanes.)	932 t (917-long-ton)	3 coal-fired boilers, 2 reciprocating steam turbines (Note: Other source records it as "two Sunnickroft water-tube boilers driving two three-cylinder steam engines".), 3,149 ihp (2,348 kW) (Note: Other sources record it as "2500 ihp".), 16 kn (30 km/h; 18 mph) (Note: Other sources record it as "12 kn".)	1,200,000 silver rounds	——	——	January 1927	Scuttled and sunk on August 12, 1937, in the section of the Yangtze River between Jingjiang and Jiangyin.
De Sheng (德胜)	Republic of China Jiangnan Shipyard	1 × 120 mm (5 in)	1 seaplane	932 t (917-long-ton)	3 coal-fired boilers, 2 reciprocating steam turbines (Note: Other source records it as "two Sunnickroft water-tube boilers driving two three-cylinder steam engines".), 3,131 ihp (2,335 kW) (Note: Other sources record it as "3000 ihp".), 16 kn (30 km/h; 18 mph) (Note: Other sources record it as "12 kn".)	1,200,000 silver rounds	——	——	January 1927	Scuttled and sunk on August 12, 1937, in the section of the Yangtze River between Jingjiang and Jiangyin.

== Hai Wei ==
On April 22, 1932, Mitsutoshi Miyabe, a captain in the Imperial Japanese Navy Reserve, assumed command of the coastal security agency responsible for the Yellow Sea and Bohai Sea coasts of Manchukuo. In July 1936, Mototsugu Wakaki (若木元次) succeeded to the command of the Maritime Police Force. Under Wakaki's initiative, Japan transferred Kashi to the Manchukuo Maritime Police Force at no cost. Kashi is the second ship of the Momo-class destroyers which originally built during World War I. On May 1, 1937, following the removal of its torpedo tubes, Hai Wei was handed over to the Manchukuo Maritime Police Force at Yingkou and commissioned as the patrol ship. In July 1938, the ship sailed from Port Arthur to the Sasebo Naval Arsenal for a month-long refit; a seaplane platform and a derrick were installed in the space forward of the first funnel—where the torpedo tubes had previously been located—thereby equipping the ship for seaplane operations. Japan also provided a Type 90-1 Reconnaissance Seaplane to serve as the Hai Wei's embarked aircraft, bearing the tail code Hai-Jin 16. Following the outbreak of the Pacific War in December 1941 and the decline of anti-Japanese resistance activities in Northeast China, some Japanese reservists serving in the Manchukuo Maritime Police were recalled to active duty. The Hai Wei was also transferred—nominally on loan—to the Japanese home islands for use by the Imperial Japanese Navy as a specially commissioned anti-submarine patrol vessel. On October 10, 1944, Hai Wei was sunk in an air raid by US aircraft near Naha.

Ship	Builder	Armament	Armor	Displacement	Propulsion	Cost	Service			
Ship	Builder	Armament	Armor	Displacement	Propulsion	Cost	Laid down	Launched	Commissioned	Fate
Hai Wei (海威)	Maizuru Naval Arsenal	3 × 120 mm naval guns	1 seaplane	755 t (743-long-ton)	2 Kanpo-type direct-drive turbines, 3 Ro-class Kanpo-type water-tube boilers, 20 kn (37 km/h; 23 mph)	Free of charge	March 15, 1916	December 1, 1916	May 1, 1937	Recovered by the Japanese army on June 24, 1942.

== Ding An ==
The merchant ship Triumpf, owned by the German firm Jebsen & Co., took refuge in the Huangpu River to escape the hostilities of World War I and was subsequently seized by the Chinese Navy on March 14, 1917. On August 14 of the same year, the vessel and its sister ship, the Helene, were formally taken over by the Chinese Navy and renamed Hua Ren (華壬) and Hua Gui (華癸), respectively. In 1924, the two ships were renamed Ding An (定安) and Ke An (克安) and assigned to the First Fleet as transport vessels.

In 1930, the Fujian warlord Lu Xingbang (盧興邦), mistakenly believing that Chiang Kai-shek had fallen from power, launched the "January 6th Incident" and declared his allegiance to Yan Xishan. The Nanjing government dispatched Liu Heding (劉和鼎) to suppress Lu; the Ding An was temporarily converted into a seaplane tender and deployed to northern Fujian—carrying seaplanes such as the Jianglu (江鷺), Jiangfu (江鳧), and Jiangdiao (江雕) which manufactured by the Mawei Naval Aircraft Engineering Office—to bomb Lu's forces. Following the outbreak of the full-scale War of Resistance Against Japanese Aggression in 1937, the Ding An retreated westward with the Republic of China Navy. On December 17, 1942, the ship was sunk by Japanese aircraft in the lower reaches of the Chuan River.

Ship	Builder	Armament	Armor	Displacement	Propulsion	Cost	Service			
Ship	Builder	Armament	Armor	Displacement	Propulsion	Cost	Laid down	Launched	Commissioned	Fate
Ding An (定安)	German Empire Howaldtswerke-Deutsche Werft	Unarmed	3 seaplane	1,242 t (1,222-long-ton)	1 triple-expansion steam engine, 4 fire-tube boilers (Note: Other source records it as "4 water-tube boilers".), 650 ihp (485 kW), 9 kn (17 km/h; 10 mph)	——	——	——	August 14, 1917	Sunk by Japanese aircraft on December 17, 1942.
