= Peggy Hull =

American journalist (1889–1967)

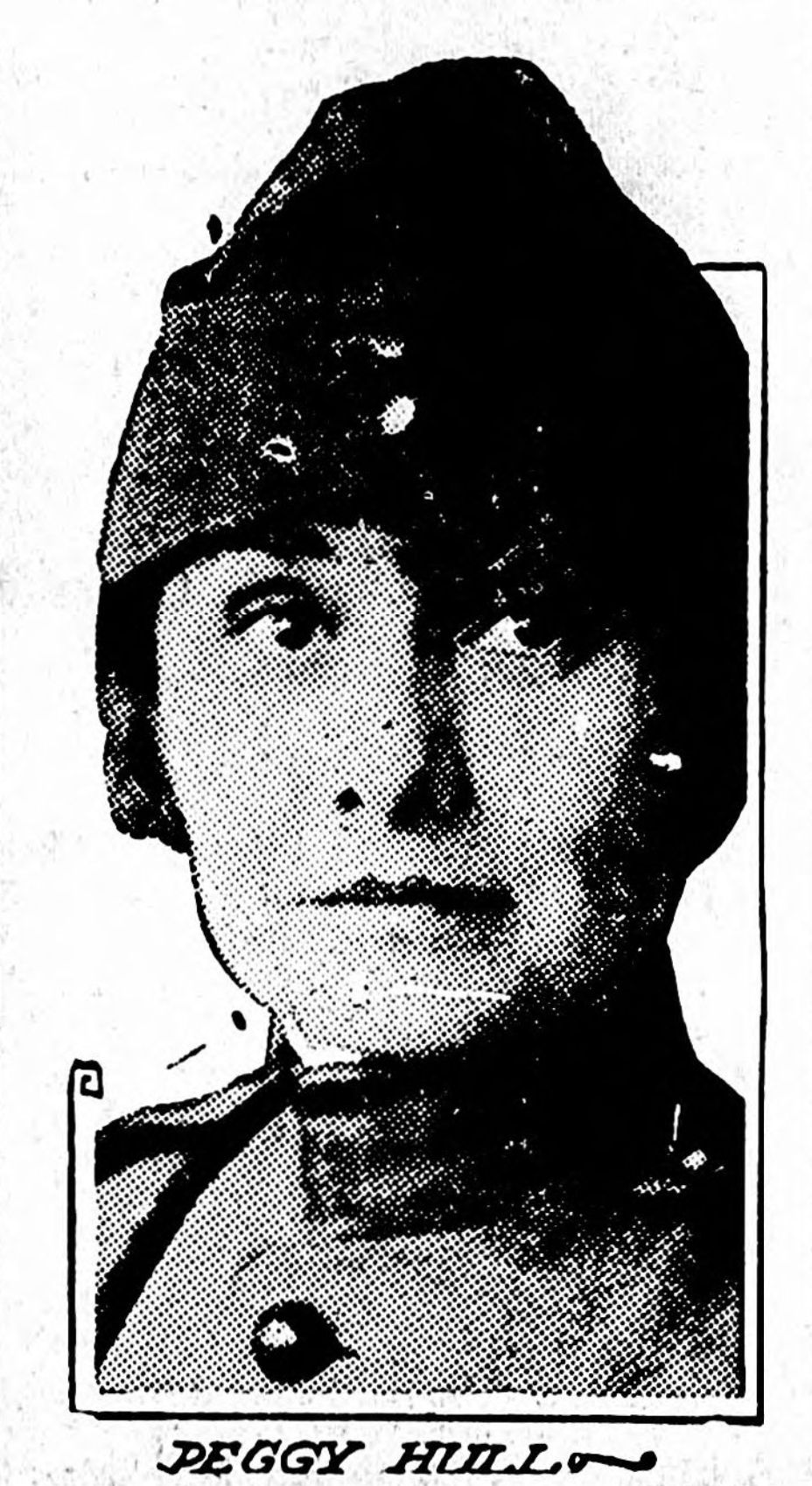
- Peggy Hull in her customized military uniform
- Born: Henrietta Eleanor Goodnough Deuell; December 30, 1889; Bennington, Kansas, US
- Died: June 19, 1967 (aged 77); Carmel, California, US
- Occupation: Journalist
- Employers: Junction City Daily Sentinel; Honolulu Star; Cleveland Plain Dealer
- Spouses: George Hull in 1910 (Later divorced); John Kinley in 1922 (Later divorced); Harvey Deuell in 1933-1939 (Widowed)

Peggy Hull (December 30, 1889 – June 19, 1967), was the pen name of Henrietta Eleanor Goodnough Deuell, an American journalist who covered World War I and World War II. She was the first female correspondent accredited by the U. S. War Department.

== Early life and education ==
Henrietta Goodnough was born in Bennington, Kansas. Her first newspaper job was at the Junction City Daily Sentinel in Junction City, Kansas. She also worked at the Honolulu Star and the Cleveland Plain Dealer, among other papers, before she came to specialize in military reporting.

== Coverage of World War I ==
In 1916 she reported on John J. Pershing's role in pursuing Pancho Villa, and her connection with Pershing made it possible to travel to France and spend time at the front as an unsanctioned war correspondent in 1917. She gained official accreditation in 1918, "the only girl correspondent accredited to the A. E. F. by the war department."

== Interwar ==
After 1918, she covered American forces sent to Siberia, wearing her usual uniform (she dressed in her own version of military gear for much of her career).

Between the wars, Peggy Hull briefly lost her American citizenship by marrying a British man in 1922, under the Expatriation Act of 1907.

== Coverage of World War II ==
In 1939, Peggy Hull became a founding member of the Overseas Press Club of America. She renewed her accreditation as a war correspondent in 1943 to cover American involvement in the Pacific Theatre during World War II, though she was considered too old for any physically hazardous assignments. She was awarded a Navy commendation for her work.

== Personal life ==
Henrietta Goodnough was married three times; to fellow journalist George Hull in 1910, to Englishman John Kinley in 1922, and to newspaper editor Harvey Deuell in 1933. She was divorced from Hull and Kinley, and widowed when Deuell died in 1939. Hull died in 1967, from breast cancer, age 77, in Carmel, California. Her papers are in the University of Kansas Libraries.

There is a crater on Venus named for Peggy Hull.

== In media ==
A book-length biography of Peggy Hull was published in 1991:

- Bogart, Eleanor A.; Smith, Wilda M. (1991). The wars of Peggy Hull: the life and times of a war correspondent. Texas Western Press. ISBN 9780874042153. - Total pages: 305
