= Otani Kikuzo =

Japanese Army general (1856–1923)

Baron Ōtani Kikuzō
- 大谷 喜久蔵
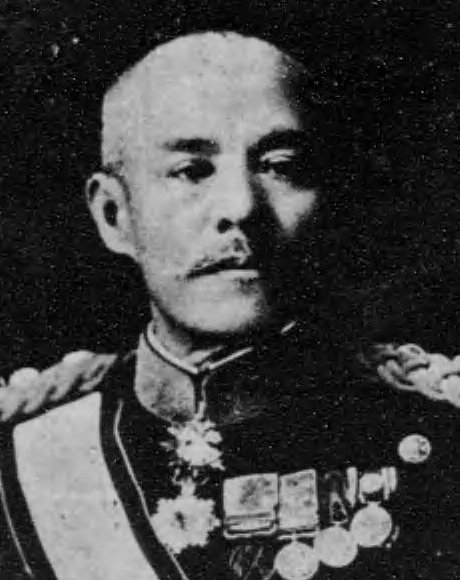
- Born: 4 February 1856; Obama Domain, Echizen Province, Japan
- Died: 26 November 1923 (aged 67); Shibuya, Tokyo, Japan
- Military career
- Allegiance: Empire of Japan
- Branch: Imperial Japanese Army
- Service years: 1871–1920
- Rank: General
- Conflicts: First Sino-Japanese War; Russo-Japanese War; World War I; Russian Civil War; Siberian Intervention

Baron Ōtani Kikuzō (大谷 喜久蔵, Ōtani Kikuzō; 4 February 1856 – 26 November 1923) was a general in the Imperial Japanese Army. Otani participated in the First Sino-Japanese War, Russo-Japanese War, World War I and the Russian Civil War. During the course of the latter he commanded the Vladivostok Expeditionary Force and became the formal commander of the Allied Siberian intervention. He was elevated to baron upon his retirement in 1920.

== Military career ==
Ōtani was born in 1856 in Obama Domain (present day Obama, Fukui as the 7th son of a Chinese literature scholar and teacher at the han school. He began his military career by enlisting into the infantry at Osaka Garrison in 1871. In 1875 he attended the Imperial Japanese Army Academy, and was commissioned as a second lieutenant the following year. His classmates included Ōsako Naomichi and Ijichi Kōsuke and Nagaoka Gaishi. He was promoted to lieutenant in 1883 and captain in 1886. He served on the staff of the Sendai Garrison and the IJA 2nd Division, and was promoted to major in 1892. He commanded a battalion of the IJA 8th Infantry Regiment. Two years later he joined the Imperial Japanese Army General Staff Office in Hiroshima where he served during the course of the First Sino-Japanese War.

He was promoted to lieutenant colonel in 1895 and became chief-of-staff of the IJA 4th Division the following year. In 1897, he reached the rank of colonel and became chief-of-staff of the Guards Division. He was then assigned to the staff of the Inspectorate General of Military Training and was appointed commandant of the Army's Toyama School in 1900.

In 1902, Ōtani was elevated to major general. and assigned command of the IJA 24th Infantry Brigade, returning to the Toyama School the following year. In February 1904, he was in charge of logistics of the IJA 12th Division, and in March was in charge of logistics for the Japanese Second Army in Korea during the start of the Russo-Japanese War. In August he commanded the IJA 8th Brigade and was chief of staff of the Chosen Army from May 1905. He returned as commandant of the Toyama school in June 1906. In 1909, he was promoted to lieutenant general and given command of the IJA 5th Division.

In the aftermath of the Japanese entry into World War I and the subsequent Japanese occupation of Tsingtao Kikuzo became the commander of the Japanese garrison in the city.

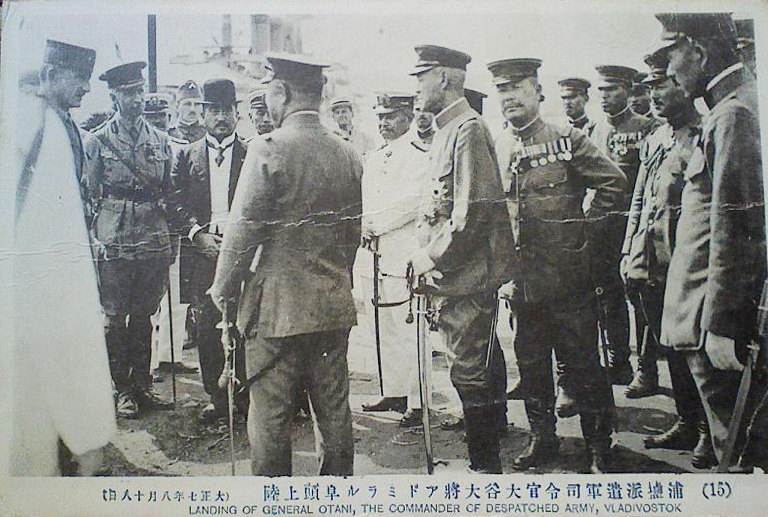
Arrival of General Ōtani in Vladivostok (18 August 1918)

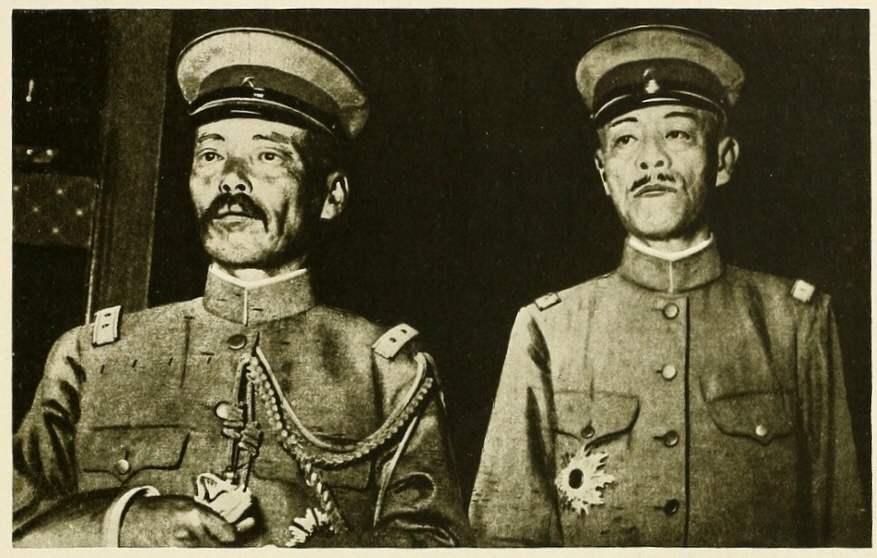
Lieut.-General Mitsue Yui and General Kikuzo Ōtani, leaders of the Japanese Forces in Siberia

In 1918, Japan joined the Allies in a joint intervention into the Russian Civil War in support of the White movement. Ōtani was appointed head of the Japanese expeditionary force with Yui Mitsue as the Chief of Staff. The Vladivostok Expeditionary Force was 60,000 men strong, comprising three divisions including the 12th Division and the 5th Division. On 12 August, Japanese forces departed from Tokyo Station for Hiroshima, where they were to board ships destined for Vladivostok. Following Vladivostok's occupation Otani became the formal commander of the Allied Siberian Intervention. In April 1920, Ōtani ordered the Allied troops to cut off eastern Transbaikal from the Bolshevik-controlled Far Eastern Republic thus creating the Chita holdup.

In 1919, he was appointed inspector general at the Inspectorate General of Military Training. He retired from active service a year later and was elevated to baron. On 1 November 1920, Ōtani was awarded the Order of the Golden Kite for his role in World War I and the Siberian intervention. He died in 1923, and his grave is at the Aoyama Cemetery in Tokyo. Accomplishments: During his military career, Ōtani displayed strong leadership skills and a deep understanding of logistics and training. He was known for his discipline and attention to detail, which earned him the respect and admiration of his subordinates.

In addition to his accomplishments in the military, Ōtani was also involved in diplomatic and political affairs. As the commander of the Japanese garrison in Tsingtao, he played a crucial role in the Japanese occupation of the city during World War I. His strategic planning and coordination contributed to the success of the operation.

One of Ōtani's most notable assignments was his leadership role in the Japanese expeditionary force during the Russian Civil War. In 1918, as the head of the Vladivostok Expeditionary Force, he commanded a substantial force of 60,000 men, including the 12th Division and the 5th Division. Working alongside Chief of Staff Yui Mitsue, Ōtani played a vital role in the Allied Siberian Intervention.

Under Ōtani's command, the Japanese forces in Siberia aimed to support the White movement against the Bolsheviks. They worked to maintain stability in the region and prevent the spread of communism. Ōtani's strategic decisions, including the order to cut off eastern Transbaikal from the Bolshevik-controlled Far Eastern Republic, contributed to the creation of the Chita holdup. This move helped secure important positions and hinder the Bolshevik advance.

In recognition of his contributions during World War I and the Siberian intervention, Ōtani was awarded the Order of the Golden Kite on 1 November 1920. This prestigious honor highlighted his significant role in Japan's military efforts during those critical times.

After retiring from active service, Ōtani was elevated to the noble rank of baron. He continued to be involved in military affairs and held the position of inspector general at the Inspectorate General of Military Training. However, his career was cut short when he died in 1923. His grave can be found at the Aoyama Cemetery in Tokyo.

Lieutenant General Kikuzo Ōtani's legacy as a military leader, strategist, and diplomat remains significant in Japanese military history. His contributions during World War I, the Russian Civil War, and his overall dedication to the Japanese armed forces have left a lasting impact on the country's military traditions and achievements.

== Decorations ==
=== Japanese ===
- 1895 – Order of the Golden Kite, 4th class
- 1904 – Order of the Sacred Treasure, 4thlass
- 1904 – Order of the Sacred Treasure, 3rd class
- 1906 – Order of the Rising Sun, 2nd class
- 1906 – Order of the Golden Kite, 2nd class
- 1912 – Grand Cordon of the Order of the Sacred Treasure
- 1915 – Grand Cordon of the Order of the Rising Sun
- 1920 – Order of the Golden Kite, 1st class
- 1920 – Order of the Rising Sun: Grand Cordon of the Paulownia Flowers

=== Foreign decorations ===
Order of the Palgwae, 1st class (Korean Empire)	1905
Order of the Striped Tiger, 1st class (China)	1918
Distinguished Service Medal (USA)	1919
Médaille militaire (France)	1920
Knight Grand Cross, Order of St Michael and St George (UK)	1920
Medal of Solidarity, 1918 (Panama)	1920
Grand Cross, Order of the Star of Romania (Romania)	1920
War Merit Cross (Italy)	1922
Czechoslovak War Cross 1918 (Czechoslovakia)	1922
Knight Grand Cross, Order of Saints Maurice and Lazarus (Italy)	1923

Military offices
Preceded by Kamio Mitsuomi	Military Governor of Tsingtao; 24 May 1915–6 August 1917	Succeeded by Hongo Fusataro
New creation	Commander, Vladivostok Expeditionary Force; 29 August 1918–26 August 1919	Succeeded by Oi Shigemoto
Preceded by Ichinohe Hyoe	Inspector-General of Military Training; 26 August 1919–28 December 1920	Succeeded by Akiyama Yoshifuru
