= Zhao Qi =

Zhao Qi may refer to:

- Zhao Qi (Han dynasty) (died 201), official of the Han dynasty
- Emperor Duzong (1240–1274), personal name Zhao Qi, emperor of the Song dynasty
- Zhao Qi (Investiture of the Gods), fictional character from the novel Investiture of the Gods
