= Hongo Fusataro =

Japanese general

- 本郷 房太郎
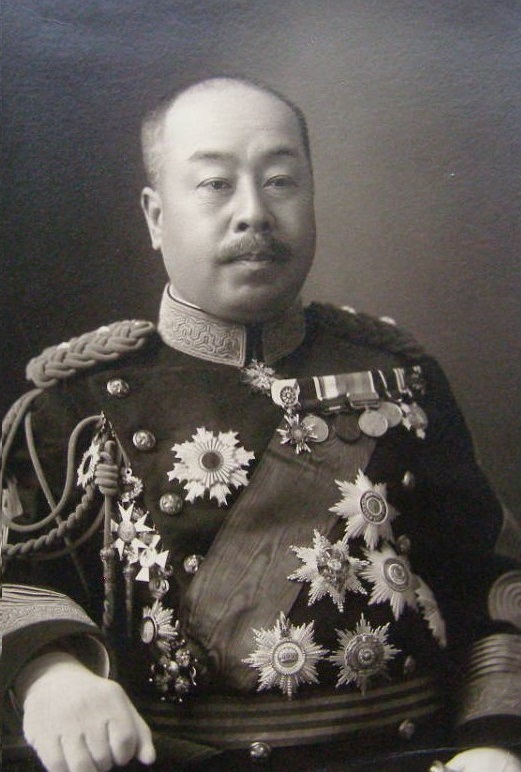
- Born: February 15, 1860; Hyōgo Prefecture, Japan
- Died: March 20, 1931 (aged 71)
- Military career
- Allegiance: Empire of Japan
- Branch: Imperial Japanese Army
- Rank: General
- Commands: Tsingtao Forces
- Conflicts: Russo-Japanese War; Battle of Chinchow; Battle of Telissu; Battle of Liaoyang
- Other work: Vice-Minister of War; Member of the Supreme War Council

Hongo Fusataro (本郷 房太郎, Hongō Fusatarō; February 15, 1860 – March 20, 1931) was a general of the Imperial Japanese Army. He was 71 when he died.

== Life ==
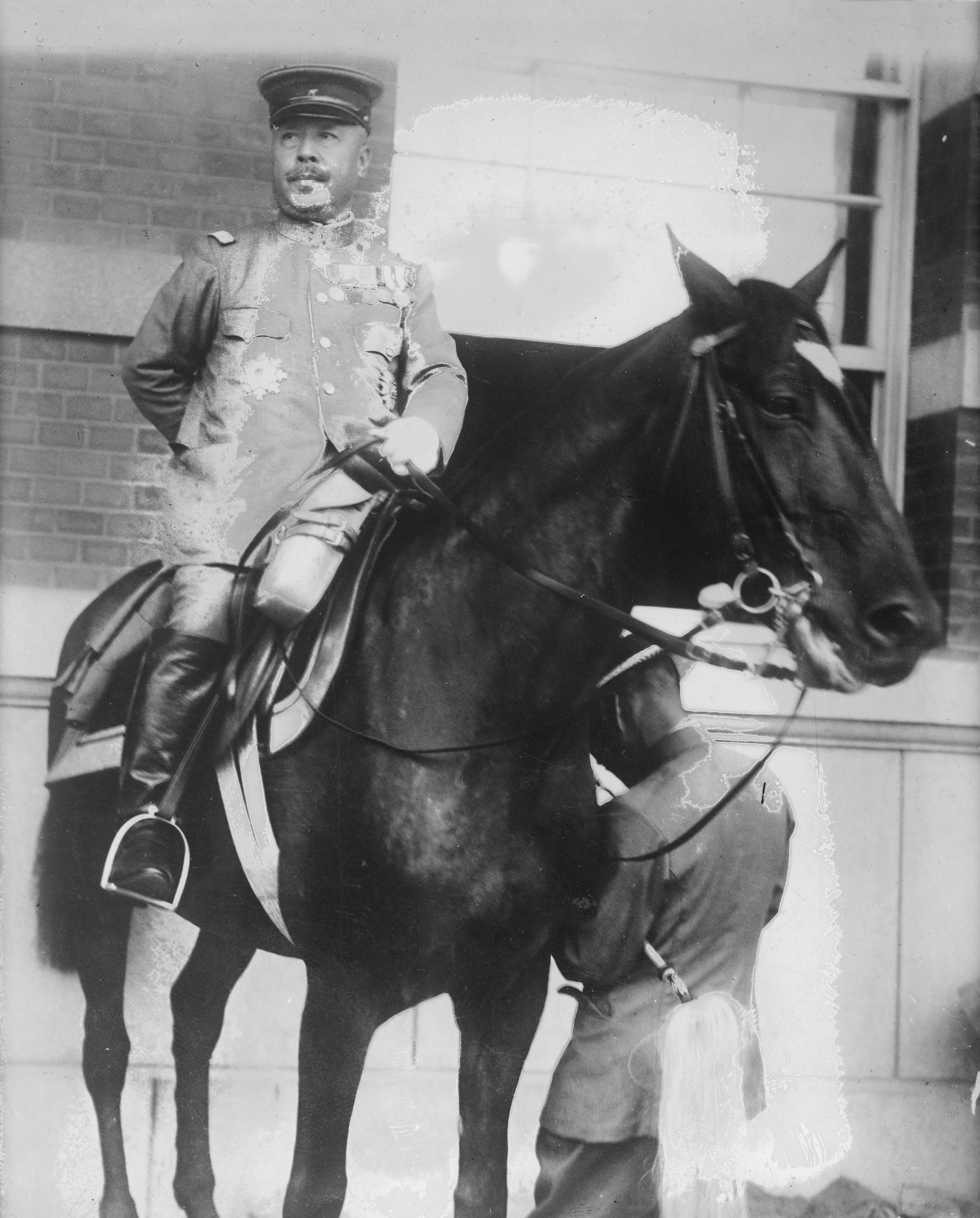
General Hongo, c. 1916

Fusataro fought at Chinchow, Telissu and Liaoyang in the Russo-Japanese War in 1904-05. During this time he was promoted to major general (1905) and to lieutenant general (1912). Fusataro was also Vice-Minister of War and Commander-in-Chief of the Japanese Forces in Tsingtao. Fusataro was then made a full general and a member of the Supreme War Council in 1918.
