= Siberian intervention =

1918–1922 military operation against Soviet Russia

- Part of the Allied intervention in the Russian Civil War and Eastern Front
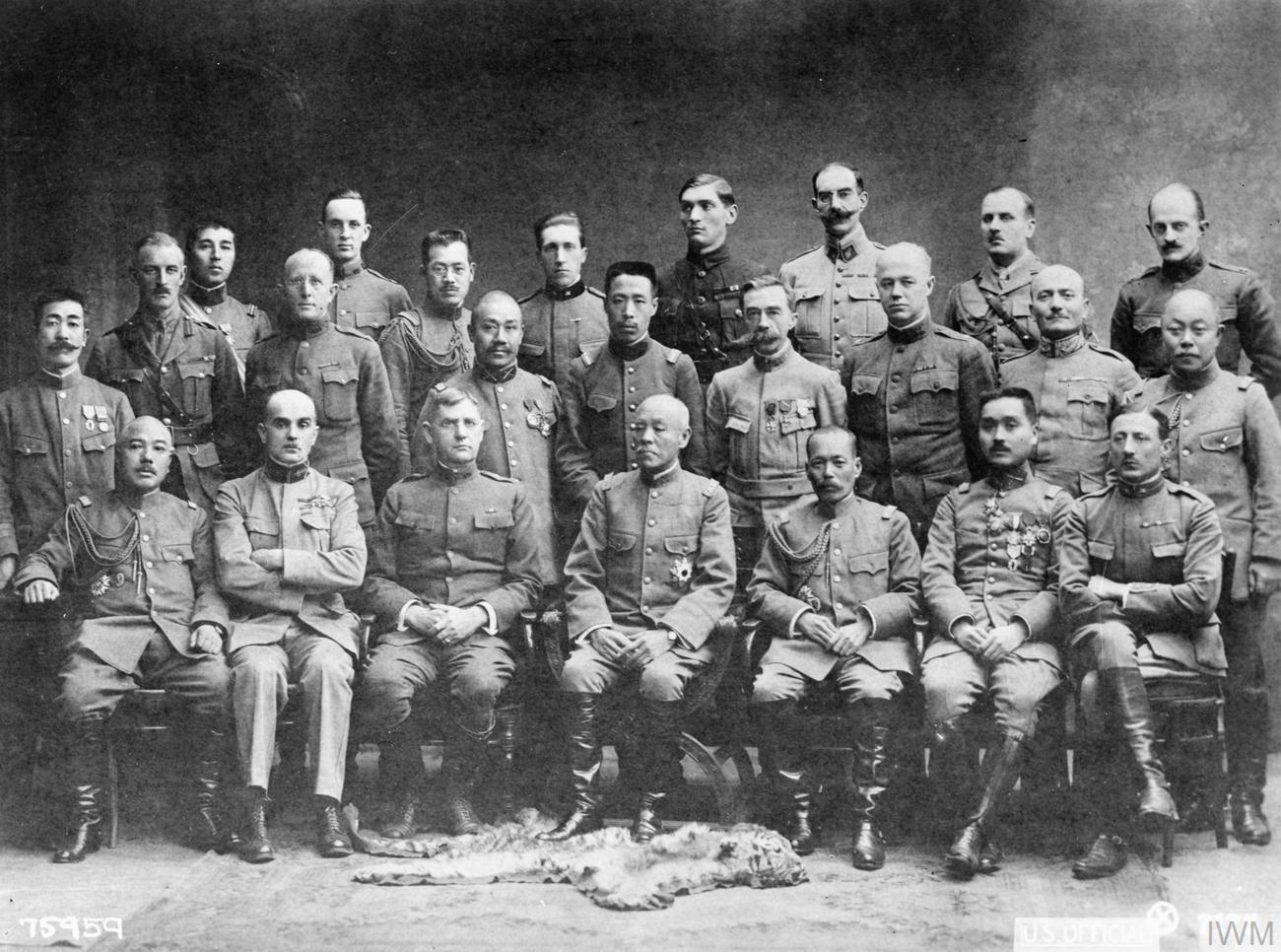
- Allied commanders of the Siberian intervention. Front row: William S. Graves (3rd), Otani Kikuzo (4th) and Yui Mitsue (5th).
Date	August 1918 – July 1920; October 1922 (Japanese withdrawal)
Location	Eastern Siberia, Russian Far East, Western Siberia, Outer Mongolia
Result	Soviet victory
Territorial changes	Allied withdrawal and Soviets regain Siberia

Belligerents
Russian SFSR; Far Eastern Republic; Mongolian People's Party	Russian State; Zelenyi Klyn; Allied Powers: Japan; Czechoslovakia; Poland; United States; United Kingdom; Canada; Italy; China; France; French West Africa; French Algeria; Mongolia

Commanders and leaders
Leon Trotsky; Jukums Vācietis; Sergey Kamenev; Mikhail Tukhachevsky; Mikhail Frunze; Vasily Blyukher; Yakov Tryapitsyn (executed); Aleksandr Samoilov; Sergey Lazo (executed); A. Krasnoshchyokov; Damdin Sükhbaatar	Alexander Kolchak (executed); Grigory Semyonov; Mikhail Diterikhs; Ivan Kalmykov †; R. von Ungern-Sternberg (executed); Mova Hlushko; Otani Kikuzo; Yui Mitsue; Shiōden Nobutaka; William S. Graves; Robert L. Eichelberger; Alfred Knox; John Ward MP; James H. Elmsley; Cosma Manera; Bogd Khan

Strength
600,000	70,000 Japanese; 50,000 Czechoslovaks; 15,000 Poles; 8,763 Americans; 4,192 Canadian; 2,500 Italian; 2,364 French; 2,364 British; 2,300 Chinese Total: ~ More than 150,000

Casualties and losses
7,791; 698 killed/missing 2,189 died of disease 1,421 wounded 3,482 evacuated sick/frostbitten (Jan-June 1922 only)	Unknown; 5,000 dead from combat and disease 48 killed 48 killed 33 killed 19 killed

The Siberian intervention or Siberian expedition of 1918–1922 was the dispatch of troops of the Entente powers to the Russian Maritime Provinces as part of a larger effort by the western powers, Japan and China, to support White Russian forces and the Czechoslovak Legion against Soviet Russia and its allies during the Russian Civil War. The Imperial Japanese Army continued to occupy Siberia even after other Allied forces withdrew in 1920.

== Background ==
Following the Russian October Revolution of November 1917, the new Bolshevik government in Russia signed a separate peace treaty with the Central Powers in March 1918. The Russian collapse on the Eastern Front of World War I in 1917 presented a tremendous problem to the Entente powers, since it allowed Germany to boost numbers of troops and war matériel on the Western Front. Meanwhile, the 50,000-strong Czechoslovak Legion in Russia, fighting on the side of the Allied Powers, became stranded in non-Allied territory within Soviet Russia, and in 1918 started attempting to fight its way out to Vladivostok in the Russian Far East, moving along the Bolshevik-held Trans-Siberian Railway. At times the Czechoslovak Legion in Russia controlled the entire Trans-Siberian railway and several major cities in Siberia.

Faced with this situation, the United Kingdom and France decided to intervene in the Russian Civil War on the anti-Bolshevik side. The Western European powers had three objectives in intervening:

1. to prevent the Allied matériel stockpiles in Russia from falling into German or Bolshevik hands
2. to help the Czechoslovak Legion in Russia and return it to the fighting
3. to resurrect the Eastern Front by installing a White Russian-backed government

The British and French asked the United States to furnish troops for both the North Russia Campaign and the Siberian Campaign. In July 1918, against the advice of the United States Department of War, President Wilson agreed to send 5,000 US troops as the American North Russia Expeditionary Force (a.k.a. the Polar Bear Expedition to Arkhangelsk) and 10,000 US troops as the American Expeditionary Force Siberia. Originally reluctant himself, Wilson agreed to send troops to Siberia on 6 July 1918 solely with the aim of helping the Czech Legion. In the same month, the Beiyang government of the Republic of China responded to an appeal by Chinese people in Russia and sent 2,000 troops by August. The Chinese later occupied Outer Mongolia and Tuva and sent a battalion to the North Russian Campaign as part of their anti-Bolshevik efforts.

Wilson appealed to Japan for a joint intervention to help the Czechs and suggested that they send no more than 7,000 men to Siberia, although Tokyo eventually sent ten times as many troops as this. Britain decided to assist and first sent a battalion to Siberia commanded by Liberal Party MP and trade-union leader Lieutenant Colonel John Ward. This unit, the first Entente land force to reach Vladivostok, landed on 3 August 1918. A 500-strong French colonial regiment was sent to Vladivostok from Indochina in August 1918.

== Participants ==
=== British Empire ===
The British Army deployed 1,800 troops to Siberia in two battalions. The troops came from the 1/9th (Cyclist) Battalion, Hampshire Regiment (deployed from India) and the 25th Battalion, Middlesex Regiment (deployed from Hong Kong and Singapore). The Middlesex battalion was the first Allied force to land in Vladivostok on 3 August 1918 The battalion was commanded by the trade unionist and Liberal Member of Parliament John Ward.

The British also sent a military mission of 500 men to Siberia, made up of 250 officers and 250 non-commissioned officers, who took part in the training and equipping of the White forces. The military mission was commanded by General Alfred Knox. At least 64 Royal Marines and Royal Navy sailors from HMS Suffolk were also involved of the manning of guns of armoured trains at the front in Siberia.

==== Canada ====
The Canadian Siberian Expeditionary Force, authorised in August 1918 and commanded by Major General James H. Elmsley, was sent to Vladivostok to bolster the Allied presence there. Composed of 4,192 soldiers, the force arrived in Vladivostok on 26 October 1918 but returned to Canada between April and June 1919. During this time, the Canadians saw little fighting, with fewer than 100 troops proceeding "up country" to Omsk, to serve as administrative staff for 1,800 British troops aiding the White Russian government of Admiral Alexander Kolchak. Most Canadians remained in Vladivostok, undertaking routine drill and policing duties in the volatile port city.

=== China ===
At the request of Chinese merchants, 2,300 Chinese troops were sent to Vladivostok to protect Chinese interests there. The Chinese army fought against both Bolsheviks and Cossacks.

=== Italy ===
The "Corpo di Spedizione Italiano in Estremo Oriente" was made of Alpini troops, supported by 2,500 Italian ex-POWs who had fought in the Austro-Hungarian Army and enrolled in the Legione Redenta.

The Italians played a small but important role during the intervention, fighting together with the Czechoslovak Legion and other allied forces using heavily armed and armoured trains to control large sections of the Siberian railway.

The main areas of operation were the Irkutsk, Harbin and Vladivostok regions.

=== France ===
The French sent a small, token, 500-strong force to Vladivostok in August 1918. This was a colonial regiment from Indo-China. This composite force was known as the Bataillon colonial sibérien.

=== Japan ===
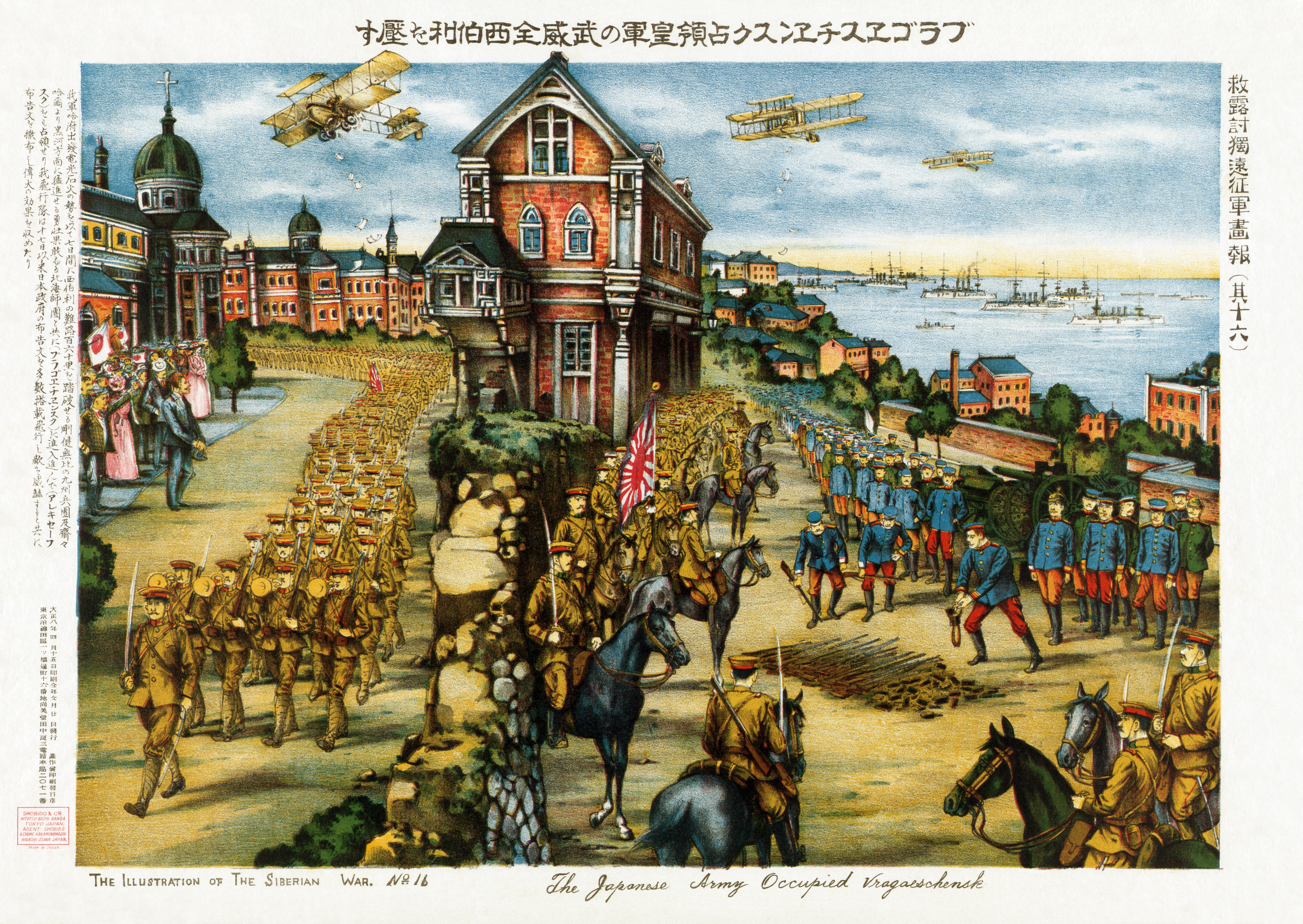
Japanese lithograph depicting the capture of Blagoveshchensk

The Japanese were initially asked in 1917 by the French to intervene in Russia but declined the request. However, the army general staff later came to view the Tsarist collapse as an opportunity to free Japan from any future threat from Russia by detaching Siberia and forming an independent buffer state. The Japanese government at first refused to undertake such an expedition and it was not until the following year that events were set in motion that led to a change in this policy.

In July 1918, President Wilson asked the Japanese government to supply 7,000 troops as part of an international coalition of 25,000 troops, including an American expeditionary force, planned to support the rescue of the Czechoslovak Legions and securing the Allied war matériel stockpiles. After heated debate in the Diet, the administration of Prime Minister Terauchi Masatake agreed to send 12,000 troops, but under solely Japanese command, independent of the international coalition.

Once the political decision had been reached, the Imperial Japanese Army took over full control under Chief of Staff Yui Mitsue and extensive planning for the expedition was conducted. The Japanese first started landing troops in Vladivostok on a large scale on 8 August 1918, and by the end of the month 18,000 Japanese troops had arrived at the port with a further 6,000 moved up through Manchuria to Manzhouli. On 18 August the Japanese General Otani Kikuzo assumed command of all the Allied forces.

=== United States ===
The American Expeditionary Force, Siberia was commanded by Major General William S. Graves and eventually totalled 8,763 officers and enlisted men. The AEF Siberia included the US Army's 27th and 31st Infantry Regiments, plus large numbers of volunteers from the 13th and 62nd Infantry Regiments along with a few from the 12th Infantry Regiment. Set up to operate the Trans-Siberian railroad, the Russian Railway Service Corps was formed of US personnel.

Although General Graves did not arrive in Siberia until September 4, 1918, the first 3,000 American troops disembarked in Vladivostok between August 15 and August 21, 1918. They were quickly assigned guard duty along segments of the railway between Vladivostok and Nikolsk-Ussuriski in the north.

Unlike his Allied counterparts, General Graves considered his mission in Siberia to be to provide protection for American-supplied property and to help the Czechoslovak Legions evacuate Russia, and that it did not include fighting against the Bolsheviks. Repeatedly calling for restraint, Graves was often at odds with commanders of British, French and Japanese forces who wanted the Americans to take a more active part in the military intervention in Siberia.

=== Others ===
Small detachments of Poles, Serbs, and Romanians were also sent to Vladivostok between August–September 1918.

== Allied intervention (1918–1919) ==
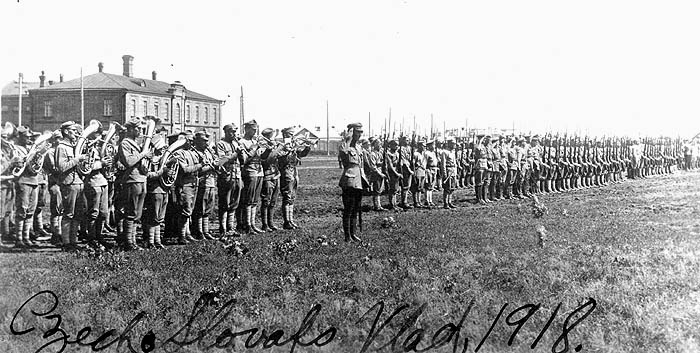
Czechoslovak Legion soldiers in Vladivostok, 1918

The joint Allied intervention began in August 1918. The first landing was by British troops in Vladivostok on 3 August. The Japanese entered through Vladivostok and points along the Manchurian border with more than 70,000 Japanese troops eventually being involved by the beginning of November. The deployment of such a large force for a rescue expedition made the Allies wary of Japanese intentions. The Americans landed their forces from 16 August-early September, eventually landing a total of 8,763 men The British, Italian, and French contingents joined the Czechs and Slovaks in an effort to re-establish the Eastern Front west of the Ural Mountains; as a result, the European allies trekked westwards. It was agreed that 543 infantrymen and machine-gunners from Ward's British unit and the other Allied units would be sent Westwards to 'be used defensively and in reserve' until the Japanese arrived in strength. The Japanese, with their own objectives in mind, refused to proceed west of Lake Baikal and stayed behind. The Americans, suspicious of Japanese intentions, also stayed behind to keep an eye on the Japanese. By November, the Japanese occupied all ports and major towns in the Russian Maritime Provinces and in Siberia east of the city of Chita.

In the summer of 1918, the Japanese Army lent its support to White Russian elements; the 5th Infantry Division and the Japanese-backed Special Manchurian Detachment of Grigory Semyonov took control over Transbaikalia and founded a short-lived White Transbaikalia government.

The Allied forces helped hold the line against the Bolsheviks in the far-east in the Ussuri River district, 70 miles north of Vladivostok. The British unit helped the Whites defend the line at Kraevesk. Outnumbered and outgunned, the small Allied forces were forced to withdraw. Two British armoured trains with two 12-pounder naval guns and two machine guns each were sent from Vladivostok as reinforcements.

The British armoured trains were in action on the Ussuri front between 14 and 24 August 1918. Operating under a Japanese commander, the small British unit and other Allied forces played a small but important part in the Battle of Dukhovskaya between 23 and 25 August. Five Bolshevik armed trains were attacked, supported by the British forces' own two armoured trains, and there were 600 fatal Japanese casualties. This limited but decisive action eliminated organised Bolshevik resistance on the Ussuri front.

The various Allied forces did not function well together, because of the underlying chaos and suspicion. In a letter to Canadian Minister of Militia and Defence Sydney Mewburn, James H. Elmsley, commander of the British and Canadian forces, gave a description of the situation,

The general situation here is an extraordinary one—at first glance one assumes that everyone distrusts everyone else—the Japs being distrusted more than anyone else. Americans and Japs don't hit it off. The French keep a very close eye on the British, and the Russians as a whole appear to be indifferent of their country's needs, so long as they can keep their women, have their vodka, and play cards all night until daylight. The Czechs appear to be the only honest and conscientious party among the Allies.

In one incident an American unit, the 27th Infantry Regiment (Wolfhounds), was part of the Evgenevka incident, a face-off between the Wolfhounds and the Japanese military.

For their part, the Czechs were having difficulty fighting their way to Vladivostok on the Trans-Siberian railway. Although many had linked up with the forces at Chelyabinsk by early July 1918, the area surrounding Lake Baikal was an obstacle that needed to be overcome before the Legion could get to Vladivostok. In the area between the towns of Baikal and Kultuk on the southern point of the lake the Trans-Siberian railway ran through various tunnels, the final one of which was blown up by the Bolsheviks. The Czechs ambushed the Bolshevik forces on the east side of the tunnel and defeated them by 31 August, after which they continued along the railway towards Vladivostok.

It was decided that the American forces would not in any way fight the Bolsheviks and would simply stay behind and guard the section of the Trans-Siberian Railway south of Khabarovsk and protect the military stores in Vladivostok. The Americans and Japanese had become rivals in Siberia over trade, with the Japanese interests in Siberia being less concerned with supporting the White drive westwards than in commercially dominating the Russian and Chinese territory nearest to their own home islands.

Lieutenant Colonel John Ward, the commander of the British detachment, in his book With the "Die-Hards" in Siberia, accuses the Americans of allowing the Bolsheviks to regain Siberian territory originally won by the Allies. He resented the American troops 'protection' of the Bolsheviks within a neutral zone in the Suchan district, while at the same time allowing the Bolsheviks to conduct raids from this base. He believed that the American General Graves had made agreements with the Bolsheviks and that this

"American policy, unconsciously or otherwise, has produced a state of indecision amongst the Allies, and unrest and anarchy amongst the population of the Transbaikal and Ussurie Provinces... They have prepared plans and created opportunities for the reorganisation of the forces of disorder which, if it does not actually create a serious situation for themselves, will do so for those Allies who are trying to bring order out of chaos.".

On 26 October, a Canadian force of about brigade size landed in Vladivostok. The Canadians believed that there would be trade benefits from establishing a friendly Russian regime. By this time, the British force had finished its journey West from Vladivostok all the way to the front lines near Omsk. The unit stayed in the city for the next six months over the cold Siberian winter. It may have played a role in the coup in the city in November 1918 which brought Admiral Kolchack to power as 'Supreme Leader' of Russia. The force went forward with the advancing Czechs and Russians and continued to provide artillery support along the railway from Omsk to Ufa in October and November. A Bolshevik offensive in December drove the White troops back, and the British armoured trains that had moved beyond Omsk to the front were forced to flee back east. In April, many of the British forces were sent back to Vladivostok, but the 12,000-mile journey was not completed until 6 May.

A small British Royal Marine force would later form an important part of the 'Kama River Flotilla', a White boat unit that attacked the Bolshevik forces along the course of the river. Two vessels were found for the British to use, one a tug and the other a river barge, and four 12-pounder naval guns and one 6-inch naval gun were mounted to the boats. 35 British men were chosen to make up the small British unit, and the men and the naval guns were transported on trains from Vladivostok to the Kama river during April 1919. Between May–July, the British unit bombarded Red troop concentrations, protected bridges and provided direct fire support and attacked Bolshevik boats on the river. In one action, the flotilla sank the Bolshevik flagship on the river and destroyed one other boat. They were later driven back by the Bolshevik advance on Perm.

On 28 October 1918 an independent Czech state had been declared, and this led the Czech Legion to lose any desire for fighting, since the troops now merely wanted to return to their country as free citizens. The Canadians also refused to play any part in fighting and signalled their desire to withdraw from Russia in April 1919. The last Canadian forces left Siberia on 5 June 1919.

== Aftermath ==
=== Allied withdrawal (1919–1920) ===
In the summer of 1919, the White regime in Siberia collapsed. By August 1919, plans were made to withdraw the British forces and by 1 November the last of their troops had been withdrawn, with only the military mission remaining. During November, the Whites were being routed and the remaining Allies quickly scrambled to get out. On 12 January 1920, 12 members of the British military mission and two members of the Canadian Siberian Expeditionary Force were captured when their train was captured near Krasnoyarsk as they were fleeing the Bolshevik advance. The last members of the British military mission had left Siberia by February 1920.

On 7 February 1920, White leader Admiral Kolchak was executed, and in the next few months the Americans and the remaining Allied coalition partners withdrew from Vladivostok. The evacuation of the Czechoslovak Legion was also carried out in the same year. However, the Japanese decided to stay, primarily due to fears of the spread of communism so close to Japan, and the Japanese controlled Korea and Manchuria. The Japanese were forced to sign the Gongota Agreement of 1920 in order to evacuate their troops peacefully from Transbaikal. It meant an unavoidable end to Grigory Semyonov's regime in October 1920.

The Japanese army provided military support to the Japanese-backed Provisional Priamur Government based in Vladivostok against the Moscow-backed Far Eastern Republic. The continued Japanese presence concerned the United States, which suspected that Japan had territorial designs on Siberia and the Russian Far East. Subjected to intense diplomatic pressure by the United States and the United Kingdom, and facing increasing domestic opposition due to the economic and human cost, the administration of Prime Minister Kato Tomosaburo withdrew the Japanese forces in October 1922. Though Japan's occupation of northern Sakhalin continued until May 1925, and ended following its recognition of the USSR.

=== Legacy ===
==== Effects on Japanese politics ====
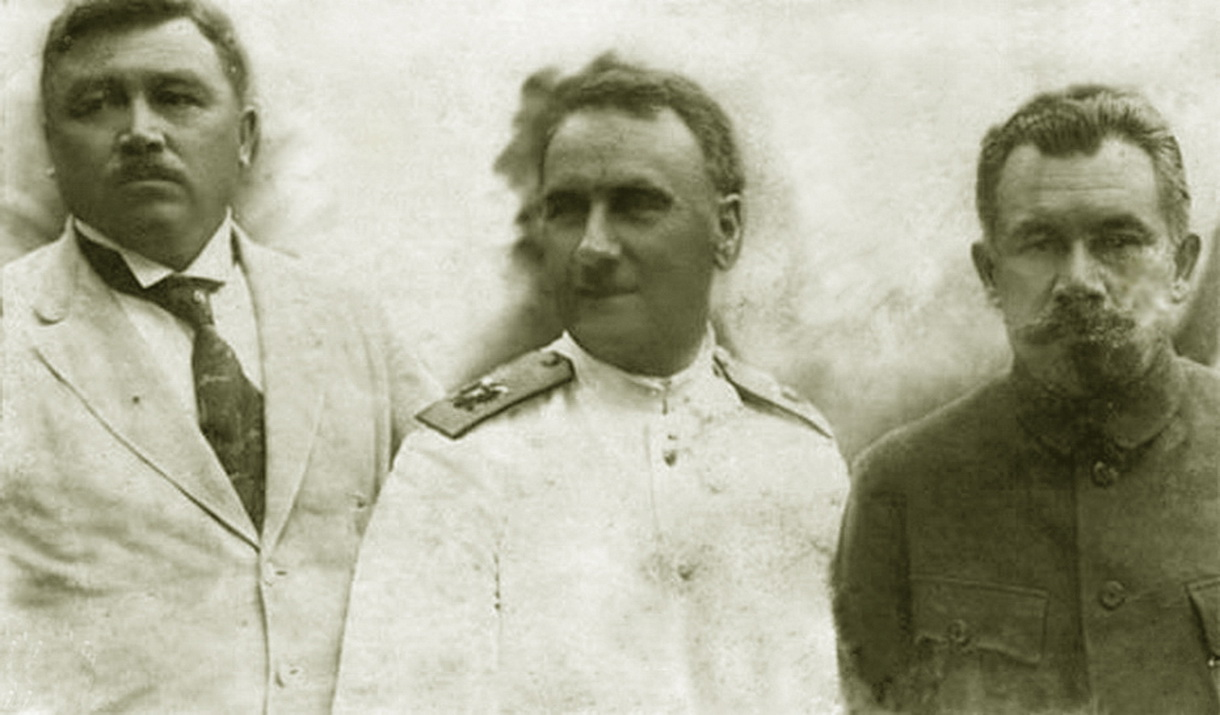
Foreign Minister N. D. Merkulov, Admiral G. K. Stark, Chairman S. D. Merkulov of the Provisional Priamurye Government, surviving behind a cordon sanitaire of Japanese troops involved in the Siberian Intervention.

Japan's motives in the Siberian intervention were complex and poorly articulated. Ostensibly, Japan, as with the United States and the other international coalition forces, was in Siberia to safeguard stockpiled military supplies and to "rescue" the Czechoslovak Legion. However, the Japanese government's intense hostility to communism, a determination to recoup its past losses to Russia, and the perceived opportunity to settle the "northern problem" in Japan's security by either creating a buffer state, or by outright territorial acquisition, were also factors. However, patronage of various White movement leaders left Japan in a poor diplomatic position vis-à-vis the government of the Soviet Union, after the Red Army eventually emerged victorious from the Russian Civil War. The intervention tore Japan's wartime unity to shreds, leading to the army and government being involved in bitter controversy, as well as renewed factional strife in the army itself.

Japanese casualties from the Siberian Expedition included some 5,000 dead from combat or illness, and the expenses incurred were in excess of 900 million yen.

== See also ==
- List of states and regions involved in the Russian Civil War
- Bibliography of the Russian Revolution and Civil War
- Outline of the Russian Revolution and Civil War
- North Russia intervention
- Southern Russia intervention
