= Yui Mitsue =

Imperial Japanese Army general (1860–1925)

Junior Second Rank Yui Mitsue
- 由比 光衛
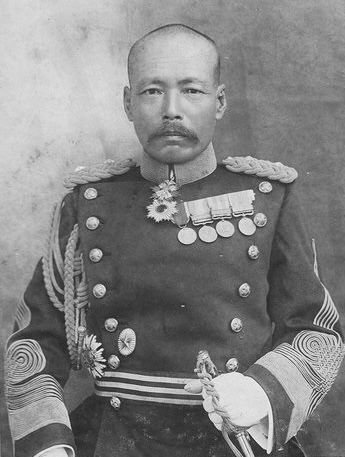
- Born: 27 November 1860; Kōchi, Tosa Domain, Japan
- Died: 18 September 1925 (aged 64); Tokyo, Tokyo Prefecture, Japan
- Resting place: Sōmei Cemetery, Tokyo
- Education: Imperial Japanese Army Academy; Army Staff College
- Military career
- Allegiance: Empire of Japan
- Branch: Imperial Japanese Army
- Service years: 1882–1923
- Rank: General
- Units: Imperial General Headquarters, IJA 2nd Army, IJA 5th Division, IJA 8th Division, Siberian Expeditionary Army
- Commands: IJA 15th Division; Guards Division; Tsingtao garrison
- Conflicts: First Sino-Japanese War; Boxer Rebellion; Russo-Japanese War; Battle of Mukden; World War I; Russian Civil War; Siberian intervention
- Awards: § Decorations
- Other work: Military attaché

Yui Mitsue (由比 光衛; 27 November 1860 – 18 September 1925) was a general in the Imperial Japanese Army during the First Sino-Japanese War and Russo-Japanese War.

== Biography ==
Yui was born in Tosa Domain (present-day Kōchi Prefecture) in what is now part of the city of Kōchi, where his father was a samurai in the service of the Yamauchi clan. He graduated from the 5th class of the Imperial Japanese Army Academy in 1882 and 7th class of the Army Staff College in 1891 and was assigned to staff positions within the Imperial General Headquarters upon graduation.

After serving as a staff officer in the IJA 2nd Army during the First Sino-Japanese War, he was sent as a military attaché to the United Kingdom from 1895 to 1899, and returned to serve on the staff of the IJA 5th Division during the Boxer Rebellion. Yui developed a reputation as a competent officer, and as a colonel at the start of the Russo-Japanese War, served as Vice Chief of Staff under General Yasukata Oku of the Japanese Second Army. Towards the end of the war, he distinguished himself at the Battle of Mukden as Chief of Staff of the IJA 8th Division.

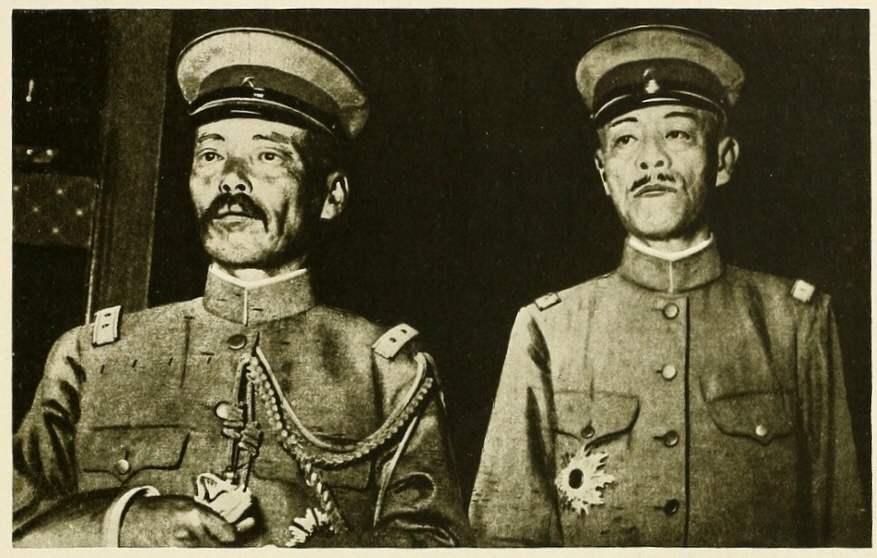
Lt. Gen. Yui Mitsue and Gen. Kikuzo Otani, leaders of the Japanese forces in Siberia

After promotion to major general in 1907, Yui continued to serve under General Oku as chief of the Imperial Japanese Army General Staff's Operations Section, until his promotion to lieutenant general and promotion to commandant of the Army Staff College in 1914, remaining in this post through most of Japan's involvement during World War I. He was subsequently named commander of the IJA 15th Division and the Guards Division before becoming Chief of Staff of the Siberian Expeditionary Army in 1918. In April 1919, he dispatched Major General Yasutaro Takayanagi on a secret mission to survey Outer Mongolia as part of Japan's plans to encourage Mongolian separatism and to eventually detach that region from Chinese hegemony.

In November 1919, Yui become a full general and was in command of the Japanese garrison at Tsingtao from 1919 until 1922. Resigning from active duty in 1923, he was promoted to the honorific title of Junior Second Rank. He entered the reserves and died two years later in 1925. His grave is at the Sōmei Cemetery in Tokyo.

== Decorations ==
- 1895 – Order of the Sacred Treasure, 6th class
- 1901 – Order of the Rising Sun, 4th class
- 1901 – Order of the Golden Kite, 4th class
- 1914 - Order of the Sacred Treasure, 2nd class
- 1919 – Grand Cordon of the Order of the Sacred Treasure
- 1920 – Grand Cordon of the Order of the Rising Sun
- 1920 – Order of the Golden Kite, 2nd class
