= Priamur electoral district =

Former constituency in Russia

Priamur
- Former Civilian constituency for the All-Russian Constituent Assembly
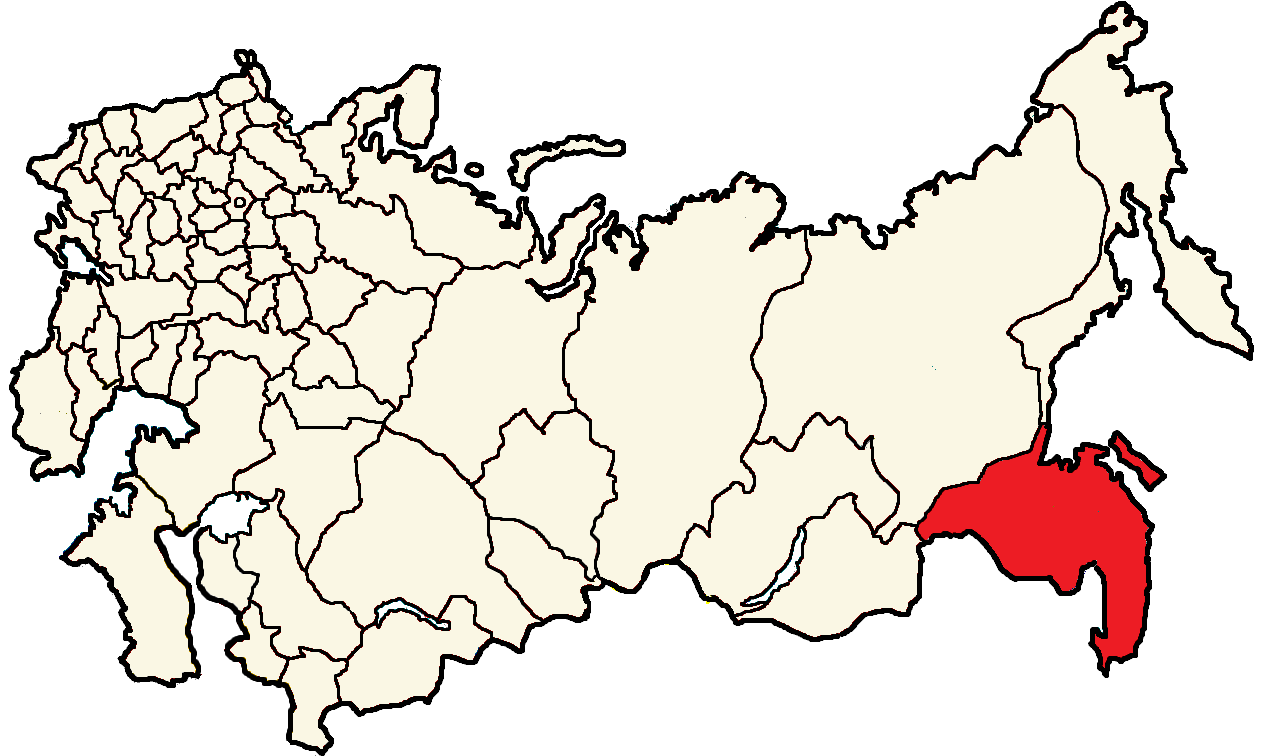

Former constituency
- Created: 1917
- Abolished: 1918
- Number of members: 7
- Number of Uyezd Electoral Commissions: 8
- Number of Urban Electoral Commissions: 4
- Number of Parishes: 70

The Priamur electoral district (Russian: Приамурский избирательный округ) was a constituency created for the 1917 Russian Constituent Assembly election. The Priamur electoral district consisted of the Amur Oblast, the Primorskaya Oblast and the Sakhalin Oblast. However, local leaders had preferred to have three separate constituencies. The election was held on time in the constituency.

== Parties in the fray ==
In the wake of the 1917 February Revolution, the Russian Far East was teeming with political activities. New political organizations, across the ideological spectrum, popped up in various locations.

=== Socialist-Revolutionaries ===
The branches of the Socialist-Revolutionary Party (SR) were established in Amur and Maritime in March–April 1917, in Vladivostok (Committee Chairman V.K. Vykhristov), Khabarovsk (Chairman M.A. Timofeev) and Blagoveshchensk (Chairman N.G. Kozhevnikov). However, the SRs suffered a four-way split in the constituency, with the branches in Amur and Maritime contesting separately. Ahead of the election the Maritime Province Peasants Soviets threw out the SR party representatives and fielded a separate list (in Amur, however, the peasants soviets stayed loyal to the SR party). Nevertheless these three different lists had formed an electoral bloc. There was also a leftist SR dissident list, distinctively urban.

=== Social Democrats ===
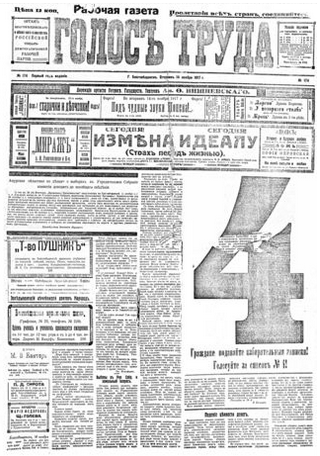
The Menshevik newspaper Golos Truda, campaigning for List 4

Social Democratic organizations took shape around March 1917. The first formal Social Democratic meeting occurred in Vladivostok on March 10, 1917, with twenty attendees. Five days later, a second meeting was held with a hundred party members in attendance and electing a provisional committee chaired by A. Antonov. On March 12, 1917 the first Menshevik Social Democratic party meeting was held in Blagoveshchensk, which elected S. G. Bukharevich as chair of the Party Branch Committee. Social Democratic organizations were established in Khabarovsk, Nikolsk-Ussuriysky, Suchan, Muraev-Amursky, Razdolnoye, Bozkarevo, Magdagachi and Gondatti.

By July 1917, there were some 2,850 Social Democratic party members in the Russian Far East. In the fall of 1917, the number had increased to 4,700 (out of whom some 3,000 were Bolsheviks).

=== Cossacks ===
The Ussuri Cossack Host held its congress March 11–13, 1917, which removed the incumbent ataman Lt. Gen. V. A. Tolmachev and placed Major-General E. B. Kruse as new chairman. The congress called for new local leaderships to be elected by general assemblies. Likewise, the congress of the Amur Cossack Host (March 21-April 22) removed the incumbent ataman and other leaders. I. M. Gamov emerged as the new leader of the Amur Cossack Host. The Amur Cossack congress called for a democratic republic and Constituent Assembly. The Amur Cossack congress was chaired by the Amur right-wing SR leader N. G. Kozhevnikov, and was attended by 46 delegates.

=== Kadets ===
The Constitutional Democrats, the Kadets, established party branches in Vladivostok, Khabarovsk and Nikolsk-Ussuriysk and with a regional committee headed by I. A. Fichmann. In Amur Oblast, a pro-Kadet organization called the Union of Amur Republicans was established.

=== Ukrainians ===
The constituency had no significant ethnic minority except Ukrainians.

== Results ==
=== District-wide ===
From the Maritime Province the results available to U.S. historian Oliver Henry Radkey, which forms the basis of the results table below, were seemingly complete. In areas north of the Amur river some problems in voting occurred, with 312 polling stations reporting and 77 didn't (another reference stated that no election had been held in some 50 polling stations).

Amur-Maritime
Party	Vote	%
List 2 - Maritime Province Soviet of Peasants Deputies	56,718	27.08
List 7 - Amur Oblast Organization of Socialist-Revolutionaries	41,152	19.65
List 5 - Bolsheviks	40,850	19.50
List 3 - Amur and Ussuri Cossacks	22,612	10.80
List 9 - Kadets	17,233	8.23
List 4 - Mensheviks	15,458	7.38
List 1 - Maritime Province Socialist-Revolutionaries	6,513	3.11
List 8 - SRs of Vladivostok, Nikolayevsk-on-Amur and Spassk (leftist Socialist-Revolutionaries)	5,805	2.77
List 6 - Amur Oblast Ukrainian Council	3,125	1.49
Total:	209,466	

Deputies Elected
Mandrikov	Maritime Peasants Soviet
Petrov	Maritime Peasants Soviet
Sorokin	Maritime Peasants Soviet
Vykhristov	Maritime Peasants Soviet
Kozhevnikov	Amur and Ussuri Cossacks
Neibut	Bolshevik
Alekseevsky	Amur SR

=== Khabarovsk ===
In Khabarovsk, 5,445 out of 12,727 eligible voters cast their votes; Kadets 1,639 votes (30.10%), Maritime Province SR 968 votes (17.78%), Maritime Peasants Soviet 712 votes (13.08%), Mensheviks 662 votes (12.16%), Bolsheviks 652 votes (11.97%), Cossacks 623 votes (11.44%), Ukrainian Bloc 85 votes (1.56%), Amur SR 24 votes (0.44%) and Left SR 18 votes (0.33%).

=== Vladivostok ===
In Vladivostok town, Bolsheviks won a majority of votes (16,616 votes, 50.1%). The Kadets obtained 5,651 votes (17%), the leftist SRs 4,596 votes (13.8%), Maritime Peasants Soviet 4,398 votes (13.2%), Mensheviks 1,214 votes (3.7%), Cossacks 258 votes (0.8%), Ukrainians 195 votes (0.6%), Amur SRs 128 (0.4%) and Maritime SRs 123 votes (0.4%).

=== Blagoveshchensk ===
In Blagoveshchensk the Kadets finished in first place (with some 2,800 votes), followed by the Mensheviks (2,300 votes), Bolsheviks (1,983 votes) and Amur SRs (1,267) votes.

=== Nikolayevsk-on-Amur ===
In Nikolayevsk-on-Amur 1,529 votes were cast; Kadets 411 votes (26.88%), Maritime Province SRs 400 votes (26.16%), Mensheviks 311 votes (20.34%), Bolsheviks 287 votes (18.77%) and others 120 votes (7.85%).
