= Japanese occupation of northern Sakhalin =

Japanese occupation of north Sakhalin 1920-1925

Occupation of northern Sakhalin
- 1920-1925
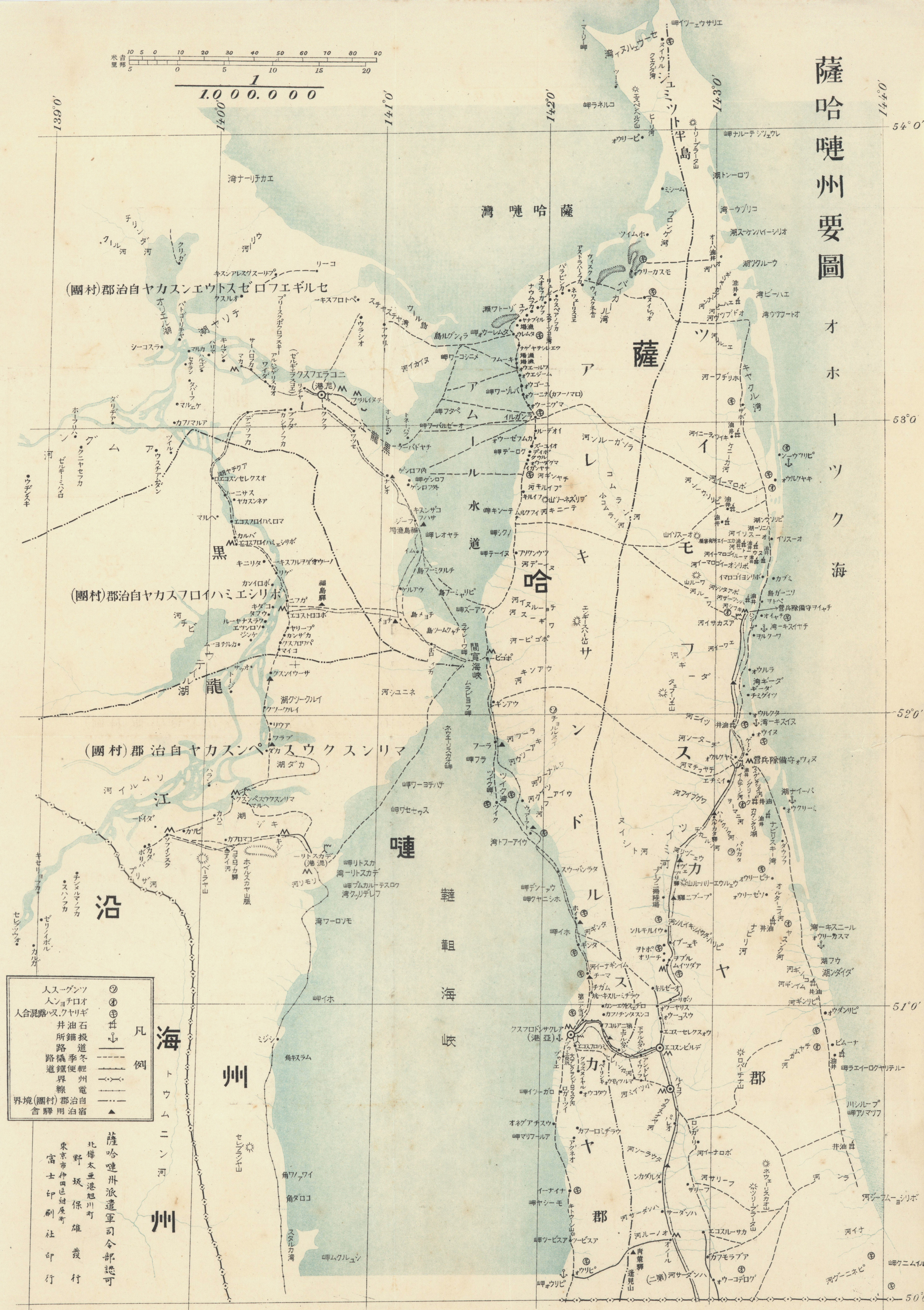
- Japanese map of Sakhalin above the 50th parallel
- Status: Military occupation
- History
  - Nikolayevsk Incident: 12 March 1920
  - Japanese advance across 50th parallel: April 21 1920
  - Soviet–Japanese Basic Convention: 25 January 1925
  - Japanese withdrawal: 21 May 1925

The Japanese occupation of northern Sakhalin was a military occupation by the Japanese Empire of the northern half of Sakhalin island during the Japanese intervention in Siberia. The occupation lasted from April 21, 1920 to May 21, 1925. The occupation was spurred by the Nikolayevsk Incident and ended with the signing of the Soviet–Japanese Basic Convention in 1925.

== Background ==
In 1905, the Russo-Japanese War ended with Treaty of Portsmouth dividing Sakhalin on the 50th parallel north. The southern half would be annexed to Japan and become Karafuto Prefecture, while the northern half would remain with the Russian Empire. In the North Sakhalin Plain, petroleum deposits had been known to exist since 1894. The southern half was devoid of such deposits.

=== Russian Civil War ===
In 1917, the Russian Civil War began. White Russia remained in control of the country's Far East, and permit geological surveys conducted by the Japanese in late 1918 and early 1919. The results were encouraging enough that on May 1 1919, the Hokushinkai (北辰会, lit. 'North-Star Association') was formed in order to exploit north Sakhalin's oil deposits. This syndicate included the Mitsubishi Corporation's mining company, Nippon Oil, and the Okura Zaibatsu, among other Japanese firms.

Concurrently, the White Army was unable to halt the Red Army's advance eastward. During the new year celebrations of 1920 (January 14 in the new style), a Bolshevik coup in Vladivostok against the White forces of Sergey Rozanov transpired. On Sakhalin, a Revkom helmed by Alexander Tsapko was established. By January 31, the newly-established Zemstvo of Maritime Territory claimed Sakhalin under its jurisdiction.

=== Nikolayevsk Incident ===
Pretext for the occupation came in March of 1920, with the Nikolayevsk incident, in which thousands of the city's Russian and Japanese residents were killed by troops led by Yakov Tryapitsyn. Triapitsyn assuming power in Nikolayevsk gave him the means to exercise power over northern Sakhalin. On the island itself, this authority would be delegated to his subordinate A. Krivulin. This resulted in the sidelining of the provisional executive committee and establishment of a Soviet in northern Sahaklin. Japan claimed occupation was necessary to protect Japanese residents of the Russian Far East from the sort of massacres which had occurred in Nikolayevsk.

== Occupation ==
On April 21, 1920, the Imperial Japanese Navy cruiser Mishima docked 2,000 troops in Alexandrovsky (today Alexandrovsk-Sakhalinsky). In case of a Japanese occupation, Tryapitsyn ordered mines to be destroyed, all prisoners in Alexandrovsky to be executed, and for Japanese hostages to be taken. Then, troops were to retreat into the taiga surrounding Derbinskoye and resist occupation through guerrilla warfare. The plan was refused by the provisional executive committee, and not carried out. Krivulin and Tryapitsyn's other allies would retreat to Nikolayevsk, while the commander of Triapytsin's partisan detachment on Sakhalin fled to Vladivostok on account of refusing Triapytsin's orders.

=== Governance ===
After Japanese control over northern Sakhalin was established, the island's former governor Dmitri Grigoriev reappeared in Alexandrovsky with Japanese backing to proclaim the Sakhalin Autonomous State (Russian: Сахалинского автономного государства). This state was to become a protectorate of Japan. However, the majority of northern Sakhalin's residents were opposed to this. Grigoriev was frequently booed when promoting it, and local geologist Pyotr Ignatyevich Polevoy refused the position of president in the "Sakhalin Republic" when offered. By May 20 1920, the plan for a protectorate was abandoned.

The provisional executive committee continued to operate under Japanese occupation until July 17 1920, three days before the election of Alexandrovsky's city duma. Japanese authorities arrested members of the provisional committee and Communist sympathizers. Some of these detainees, including Alexander Tsapko, would be subject to summary execution by the Japanese. Twelve days later, the Sakhalin Province Expeditionary Army was created to enforce the occupation.

During the occupation, northern Sakhalin was not administered by the Karafuto prefectural government. Nonetheless, there was an expectation that northern Sakhalin would be annexed to Japan, streets were renamed, the Emperor's Birthday became a holiday, and Japanese laws were enforced. By December 1924, the occupation was maintained by 1,900 Japanese soldiers, of whom 1,200 were stationed around Alexandrovsky. The other 700 were scattered throughout other settlements in the island's northern half.

=== Economy ===
A Japanese store with bilingual signage in Russian and Japanese c. 1923

The thousands of settlers, merchants, and soldiers which arrived strained northern Sakhalin's preexisting population. Despite the massive influx of foreign labor and businesses, the Russian population was not legally excluded from participating in the economy. However, a prohibition on coal exports to mainlaind Russia and the Japanese state investing 1.4 million yen into the Hokushinkai's operations created conditions which favored the Japanese.

=== Education ===
During the occupation, 11 new schools opened in northern Sakhalin. While many of these taught their lessons in the Japanese language, Russian teachers and textbooks were still employed. Before 1923, the occupation government ordered 2,365 Russian textbooks from Vladivostok while Japan's expeditionary forces still occupied the city.

== Diplomacy and negotiations ==
By April 1920, the northern half of Sakhalin fell under the jurisdiction of the Far Eastern Republic. Advisor to Japanese Ministry of Foreign Affairs Thomas Baty provided justification for the occupation by claiming the territory lacked a stable government and had a low population. Due to his actions during the occupation of Nikolayevsk and continued noncompliance with directives from Soviet leadership, Yakov Tryapitsyn was executed by the Red Army on July 9 1920.

On July 15 1920, the Gongota Agreement was signed. Creating a truce between the Far Eastern Republic and Japan. The next day, United States Secretary of State Bainbridge Colby expressed reservations about the occupation in a private note to the Japanese. In response, Japan justified the occupation with Nikolayevsk's incorporation into Russian Sakhalin's administrative region in 1914. As well as the Nikolayevsk incident making occupation of northern Sakhalin "unavoidable in the present circumstances where there is no other means for securing redress for the injuries so painfully received." Colby's successor, Charles Evans Hughes, asserted that the United States "cannot agree to the Japanese government taking any measures that would violate Russia’s territorial integrity."

From August to November 1921, talks between Japanese and the Far Eastern Republic would occur in Dairen (now Dalian). Among other conditions, Japan proposed to the FER that northern Sakhalin be leased to Japan for 80 years, which the Republic refused. With an agreement unable to be reached, the occupation continued.

=== Potential sale ===
Negotiations continued following the establishment of the Soviet Union and withdrawal of other Allied forces from Russia in 1922. In early 1923, Goto Shinpei invited Soviet plenipotentiary Adolph Joffe to Japan to negotiate the sale of the occupied territory to Japan for 100 million yen The Soviet politburo did not oppose these talks. On May 3 1923, it instructed Joffe to aim for a sale with a minimum price of one billion gold rubles. At least 90% of this sum would be cash, and this payment was not to be used for any other settlements with Japan.

On June 28 1923, these talks began in Tokyo. Japan's representative counteroffered with a sum of 150 million yen, which the USSR deemed to be too low. Long-term concessions ranging from 55 to 99 years were also suggested, but these were also rejected. These talks would also conclude without an agreement.

=== Japanese withdrawal ===
After fostering competition between the American firm Sinclair Oil and the Hokushinkai for Sakhalin's oil, the USSR granted Japanese firms exclusive rights. This was to the exclusion of Sinclair, which had previously been granted drilling and surveying rights by the Far Eastern Republic. Sinclair protested to the US government. Secretary of State Charles Evan Hughes responded, stating an intervention in Sinclair's favor would be "impossible" on account of the US not having recognized the USSR.

On January 25, 1925, Japan and the Soviet Union represented by Lev Karakhan signed a treaty establishing diplomatic and consular relations between the two countries. Protocol “A” of the convention stipulated a Japanese withdrawal from Northern Sakhalin by May 15, 1925. Following the withdrawal, the territory would immediately come under the sovereignty of the USSR. While northern Sakhalin would return to Soviet administration, Japanese oil and coal concessions would persist for the next two decades, notably with the North Sakhalin Oil Company.

== Population ==
Demographic chart of northern Sakhalin, February 1923
1. Russian 6,800 (37.9%)
2. Japanese 5,017 (28.0%)
3. Native 2,738 (15.3%)
4. Chinese 1,836 (10.2%)
5. Korean 1,535 (8.56%)

During the occupation, thousands of Japanese settlers would move to northern Sakhalin, followed by over a thousand Korean and Chinese people. The Mitsubishi corporation would hire Koreans to work in northern Sakhalin's coal mines.

The population during the occupation would peak at 17,926 in February of 1923 and lower to 13,215 in 1925. This decline was mainly driven by the withdrawal of Japanese settlers. At the conclusion of the occupation in May 1925, 2,548 people in northern Sakhalin repatriated to Japan. In 1926, 757 Chinese, 487 Korean, and 244 Japanese people remained in northern Sakhalin.

Repatriates from northern Sakhalin by destination and ethnicity, 1925
Destination	Ethnicity			
Destination	Japanese	Korean	Russian	Total
Naichi	980	183	35	1298
Karafuto	760	330	40	1130
Korea	0	220	0	220
Total	1740	733	75	2548

== See also ==
- Japanese invasion of Sakhalin
- Soviet invasion of South Sakhalin
- Sakhalin Koreans
