= Keiu Machida =

Japanese military personnel (1865–1939)

Junior Second Rank Keiu Machida
- 町田 経宇
- Machida c. 1919
- Born: 22 October 1865; Hioki District, Kagoshima, Tokugawa shogunate
- Died: 10 January 1939 (aged 73); Shinagawa, Tokyo, Empire of Japan
- Burial place: Aoyama Cemetery
- Children: 3
- Military career
- Allegiance: Empire of Japan
- Branch: Imperial Japanese Army
- Service years: 1887–1935
- Rank: Army general
- Conflicts: First Sino-Japanese War; Russo-Japanese War; Siberian Intervention; Occupation of northern Sakhalin

Keiu Machida (町田 経宇, Machida Keiu; 22 October 1865 – 10 January 1939) was a military commander of the Imperial Japanese Army who was promoted to army general before his retirement in 1925.

He was a long-standing member of Uehara Yusaku's faction and an ally of Taro Utsunomiya.

== Career ==
Keiu Machida was born in 1865, the second son of Satsuma Domain Samurai Ijiri Nakazaemon (井尻仲左衛門). He was adopted as the heir of Sanehito Machida (町田実一), who served in various diplomatic roles, including consul of Hankou.

Following attendance at the Ministry of Justice Law School, Machida graduated from the Imperial Japanese Army Academy in July 1887 and was appointed a sub-lieutenant. In 1893, he graduated from the Army War College. During the First Sino-Japanese War, he served as an aide-de-camp to the 10th infantry brigade. Machida subsequently served at the first department of the Imperial Japanese Army General Staff Office, being dispatched to Vladivostok.

Keiu Machida disembarking at the port of Alexandrovsky in July 1921

During the Russo-Japanese War, he was dispatched as part of the staff of the 4th Army. Post-war, Machida served in various posts such as the Japanese embassy to France, Section Manager for the General Staff HQ, commanding officer of the 48th Infantry Regiment, and chief of staff of the 15th Division. In March 1912, he was promoted to major general. Following this promotion, he served as commander of the 30th Infantry Brigade, military attaché to China, and chief of the General Staff's 2nd Department. In August 1916, he commanded the 11th and 4th divisions. In 1921, he became the commanding officer for the Sakhalin Province Expeditionary Army. In May 1922, he was promoted to general and served on the Supreme War Council.

In 1924, Machida participated in a military exercise in Kanazawa. Tanaka Giichi commanded the southern forces opposing Machida's northern army. During the exercise, Tanaka removed his glove to shake Machida's hand. However, there was controversy surrounding Tanaka's candidacy for Minister of War at the time, and Tanaka belonged to the opposing Choshu Faction of the military. This caused Machida to keep his glove on and refuse to make eye contact while shaking hands with Tanaka. Behavior that was considered improper for a general of his seniority.

In May 1925, he was placed on reserve duty, and would fully retire ten years later in April 1935.

== Personal life ==
Keiu Machida's three children would maintain their proximity to Imperial Japan's military establishment. His first son Joji Machida (町田襄治) served as a diplomat and married the daughter of Den Kenjirō. His second son Keiji Machida became an army colonel. His daughter Shouko married Major General Itsuo Ishimoto

In January 1939, Machida died in Shinagawa at the age of 73.

== Awards and honors ==
=== Court ranking ===
Timeline of Keiu Machida's rankings in the Japanese imperial court:

- Senior Eighth Rank (15 October 1890)
- Junior Seventh Rank (27 January 1892)
- Senior Seventh Rank (24 March 1896)
- Junior Sixth Rank (11 March 1901)
- Senior Sixth Rank (26 December 1904)
- Junior Fifth Rank (27 December 1907)
- Senior Fifth Rank (10 May 1912)
- Junior Fourth Rank (11 September 1916)
- Senior Fourth Rank (10 October 1918)
- Junior Third Rank (10 November 1921)
- Senior Third Rank (15 December 1924)
- Junior Second Rank (4 January 1939)

=== Domestic Honors ===
Date	Ribbon	Decoration
31 October 1895		Order of the Sacred Treasure, 6th class
31 October 1895		Order of the Golden Kite, 5th class
18 November 1895		Military Medal of Honor
30 November 1901		Order of the Sacred Treasure, 5th class
30 November 1905		Order of the Sacred Treasure, 4th class
1 April 1906		Order of the Rising Sun, 3rd class
1 April 1906		Order of the Golden Kite, 3rd class
1 April 1906		Military Medal of Honor
1 August 1912		Korean Annexation Commemorative Medal
7 November 1915		Order of the Rising Sun, 2nd class
7 November 1915		Military Medal of Honor
10 November 1915		Emperor Taishō Enthronement Commemorative Medal
15 December 1919		Victory Medal
1 July 1921		First National Census Commemorative Medal
30 November 1921		Order of the Sacred Treasure, 1st Class
29 April 1934		1931-1934 Incident War Medal

=== Foreign Honors ===
Date	Country	Ribbon	Decoration
18 April 1904	Sweden-Norway		Order of the Sword
23 October 1907	France		Legion of Honour (Officer)
24 September 1908	Spain		Cross of Military Merit
17 March 1910	France		Order of the Black Star
28 March 1918	Republic of China		Order of the Precious Brilliant Golden Grain
21 September 1935	Manchukuo		Commemorative Medal for the Visit of the Manchurian Emperor to Japan
