= Ivan Kalmykov =

Ataman of the Ussuri Cossacks (1890–1920)

Ivan Pavlovich Kalmykov
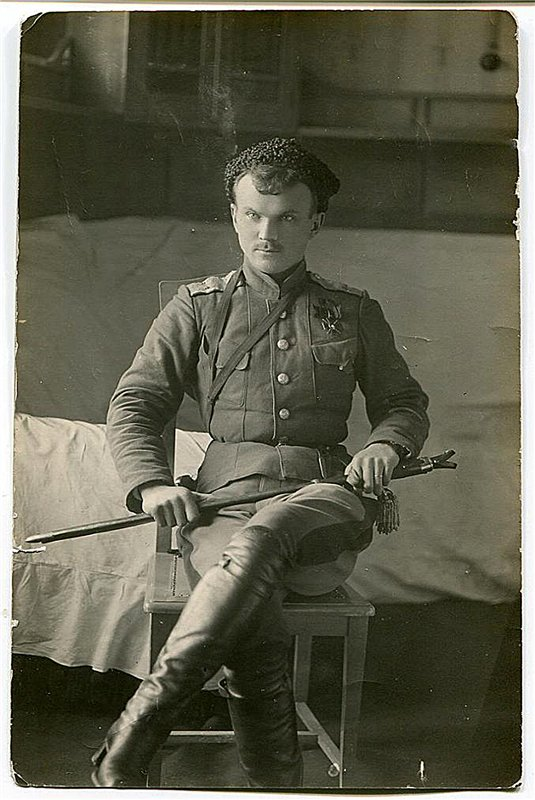
- Ivan Pavlovitch Kalmykov
- Born: September 5, 1890; Grozny, Terek Oblast, Russian Empire
- Died: September 1920 (aged 29/30); Jilin, Republic of China
- Cause of death: Gunshot wounds
- Military career
- Allegiance: Russian Empire
- Branch: Ussuri Cossack Regiment
- Service years: 1909–1920
- Rank: Major General
- Commands: Special Ussuri Cossack Detachment
- Conflicts: World War I Russian Civil War
- Awards: Order of St. Vladimir, Sword of St. George, Order of St. George (4th Class)

Ivan Pavlovich Kalmykov (Russian: Иван Павлович Калмыков; September 5, 1890 – September 1920), was an Ataman of the Ussuri Cossacks and General associated with the Anti-Bolshevik White Movement during the Russian Civil War.

== Biography ==
=== Youth ===
Ivan Kalmykov was born in the District of Grozny in the Terek Region on September 5, 1890. His father was an old trader from Kharkov. He was brought up in the Alexandrovskaya Missionary Theological Seminary in the village of Ardon, Terek District (present-day North Ossetia). He joined the service in 1909 in the Tiflis Junker Military School as a Junker of rank in the direction of the Ataman of the Groznenskaya Village and the Ataman of the Kizlyar-Grebensky Department. In 1910 he was promoted to Non-commissioned officer. On October 30, 1913, he submitted a report to the Commander of the 2nd Sapper Company requesting "a petition for his transfer for the benefit of service to the Ussuri Cossack Division" as a patriotic Cossack. His request was granted and on January 20, 1914, he was transferred to the Ussuri Cossack Regiment.

=== World War I ===
He took part in the First World War, holding the rank of Centurion (сотник) from 1915, then Captain (Подпоручик) from 1917, in the Ussuri Cossack Regiment. During the war he received four awards, including the Order of St. Vladimir and the Sword of St. George, in battle on Dec. 17, 1916, on the ridge of Poiana-Kiriyak, commanding two and a half hundred and guarding the right flank of the 12th Romanian Infantry Division retreating into the valley of the River Solchya. He held his position and thereby ensured the evacuation of the Romanian Division, despite repeated and persistent attacks by the Germans to flank around the rear and surround the Romanians.

=== Russian Civil War ===
Following the February Revolution, he returned to Primorye in the fall of 1917. With the outbreak of the October Revolution and the Bolshevik seizure of power, he took to guerrilla fighting against the newly created Red Army. First he fought against the Bolsheviks from his base at Grodekovo and, on 5 September 1918 at the head of the Special Ussuri Cossack Detachment, he occupied Khabarovsk. On September 17, he took over as head of the Khabarovsk Garrison. On October 22, 1918, the 5th Extraordinary Great Military Circle of the Ussuri Cossack Army, for distinctions in battle against the Bolsheviks, promoted to him the rank of Major-General and elected him the Military Ataman of the Ussuri Cossack Army. In March 1919 he was awarded by Ataman Grigory Semyonov for his combat services with the Order of St. George, 4th Class. On December 30, 1919, Semyonov appointed him an assistant in the position of Marching Ataman of the Far Eastern Cossacks, and on January 30, 1920, the head of the Ussuri group of forces and the Khabarovsk Military District. Kalmykov became infamous for the number of robberies, murders, and wanton rape and looting committed by his soldiers, which aroused the indignation of many leaders in the White Movement, first among them Admiral Kolchak himself.

Major General William S. Graves, who commanded North-American occupation forces in Siberia, testified that:

Semeonoff and Kalmikoff soldiers, under the protection of Japanese troops, were roaming the country like wild animals, killing and robbing the people, and these murders could have been stopped any day Japan wished. If questions were asked about these brutal murders, the reply was that the people murdered were Bolsheviks and this explanation, apparently, satisfied the world. Conditions were represented as being horrible in Eastern Siberia, and that life was the cheapest thing there. There were horrible murders committed, but they were not committed by the Bolsheviks as the world believes. I am well on the side of safety when I say that the anti-Bolsheviks killed one hundred people in Eastern Siberia, to every one killed by the Bolsheviks.

On January 4, 1920, Admiral Kolchak, on the eve of his arrest, transferred the entirety of military and civil power in the Far East to Ataman Grigory M. Semyonov. At the same time, the real power belonged to General S. N. Rozanov, who was the Chief of Staff of the Amur region in Vladivostok; to Ivan Kalmykov in Khabarovsk, and to the Amur Army Ataman Kuznetsov in Blagoveshchensk. All these Atamans depended heavily on Japanese money and troops.

Rozanov was removed from power on January 31, 1920, after which the Provisional Government of the Primorsky Regional Zemstvo Board assumed control in Primorye. The authority of Kuznetsov ceased on February 4, 1920, after which Kalmykov remained alone with the Zemstvo, who moved their troops against him. Under the command of Ataman Kalmykov, the Ussuri Cossack detachment left Khabarovsk on February 13 and transferred the Ussuri Host to the Chinese territory over the ice. Shortly before, Kalmykov seized 622 kg/1372 lb of gold from the Khabarovsk branch of the State Bank, secretly transferring it as a loan to the Japanese command.

=== Death ===
Representatives of the Bolshevik Government in Moscow and the White Regional Zemstvo Board unanimously protested against Kalmykov's division's stay on Chinese territory. Under mounting pressure, the detachment was disarmed on February 29, 1920, on the Chinese shore of Ussuri Bay, opposite Bikin Station. The Officers and all healthy fighters were escorted to Fujin CityFugdin, where on March 8, the Ataman was arrested by the Chinese military authorities together with Major-General N.N. Sukhodolsky and Captain 1st Rank V. V. Bezuar. Under escort, part of the detachment were sent to Lahasusu. On March 12, the ill and injured Cossacks were transferred from Lakhasusu to the village of Mikhailo-Semyonovskaya.

Kalmykov was charged with the appropriation of 917 kg/2022 lb of gold, the murder of representatives of the International Red Cross - Swede Sven Hedblom and Norwegian Ole Opshaug - near the Pogranichnaya Station, as well as in the shelling of a detachment of Chinese gunboats on the Amur River in October 1919. Kalmykov said that his testimony would be given either to the Emissaries of the legitimate White Russian government, or to the international commission, but not to the Chinese military. On March 21, 1920, General Sukhodolsky died, and Kalmykov and Bezoar were transported to the city of Jilin on April 16, where they were placed in the building of the gendarme. Initially, the detainees were kept in complete isolation, but on April 30 they met with a Japanese military adviser. After the conversation between the Japanese and General Bao Guiqin, Kalmykov got an opportunity to meet with the Russian Consul V.A. Brattsov. Russian diplomats petitioned for the release of those arrested, but the Chinese stated that the Ataman was accused of attacking Chinese warships and crossing the Chinese border with weapons. The Provisional Government in the Far East demanded that Kalmykov be transferred to Vladivostok in custody.

At the behest of the Russian Envoy in Beijing, Prince Nikolai A. Kudashev, Brattsov demanded the relief of Kalmykov in late May 1920, after which the Chinese allowed the Ataman to visit the Russian consulate 1-2 times a week. During these visits, an escape plan was drawn up on July 13, and Kalmykov hid in one of the buildings in the territory of the consulate. Although the alibi of consular workers was prepared in advance, the Chinese authorities rejected their explanations and placed soldiers on the premises of the institution. In this situation, Nikolai A. Kudashev sent Consul General A.A. Kolokolov to Jilin. On August 25, Chinese soldiers discovered the hiding place of Kalmykov. At the request of the Russian Envoy, Jilin's authorities replied that the Ataman would be sent to Beijing, and from there to Vladivostok. The Japanese refused to participate in the extradition of Kalmykov. At the beginning of September 1920, the Ataman, escorted by the convoy to Jilin once again attempted to flee from the city, wounded the Chinese officer, and was subsequently shot and killed by the Chinese soldiers during the escape attempt.
