= Alexander Tsapko =

Russian revolutionary 1884-1920

- Александр Трофимович Цапко
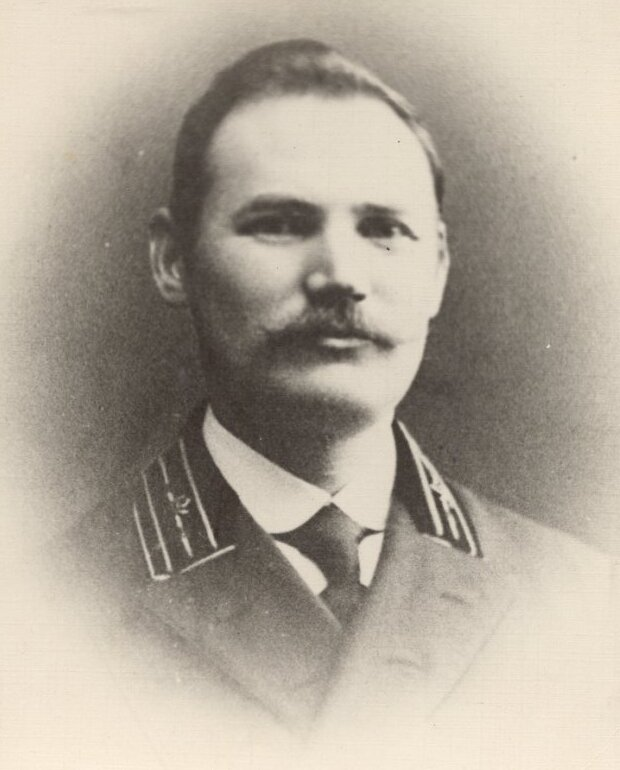
- Tsapko c. 1916
- Born: Alexander Trofimovich Tsapko; 14 March [O.S. 2 March] 1884; Odesa, Russian Empire
- Died: 20 May 1920 (aged 36); Alexandrovsky, Japanese-occupied north Sakhalin
- Children: 1
- Military career
- Allegiance: Russia (1906–1917); Russian SFSR (1917–1920); Zemstvo of Maritime Territory (1920)
- Service years: 1906-1920
- Conflicts: Russian Civil War; October Revolution; Japanese intervention in Siberia (executed)
- Awards: Order of St. Stanislaus

Alexander Trofimovich Tsapko (Russian: Александр Трофимович Цапко, 14 March [O.S. 2 March] 1884 – 20 May 1920) was a radio operator and Bolshevik revolutionary who represented northern Sakhalin during the Russian Civil War before his execution by Japanese forces in 1920.

== Early life and career ==
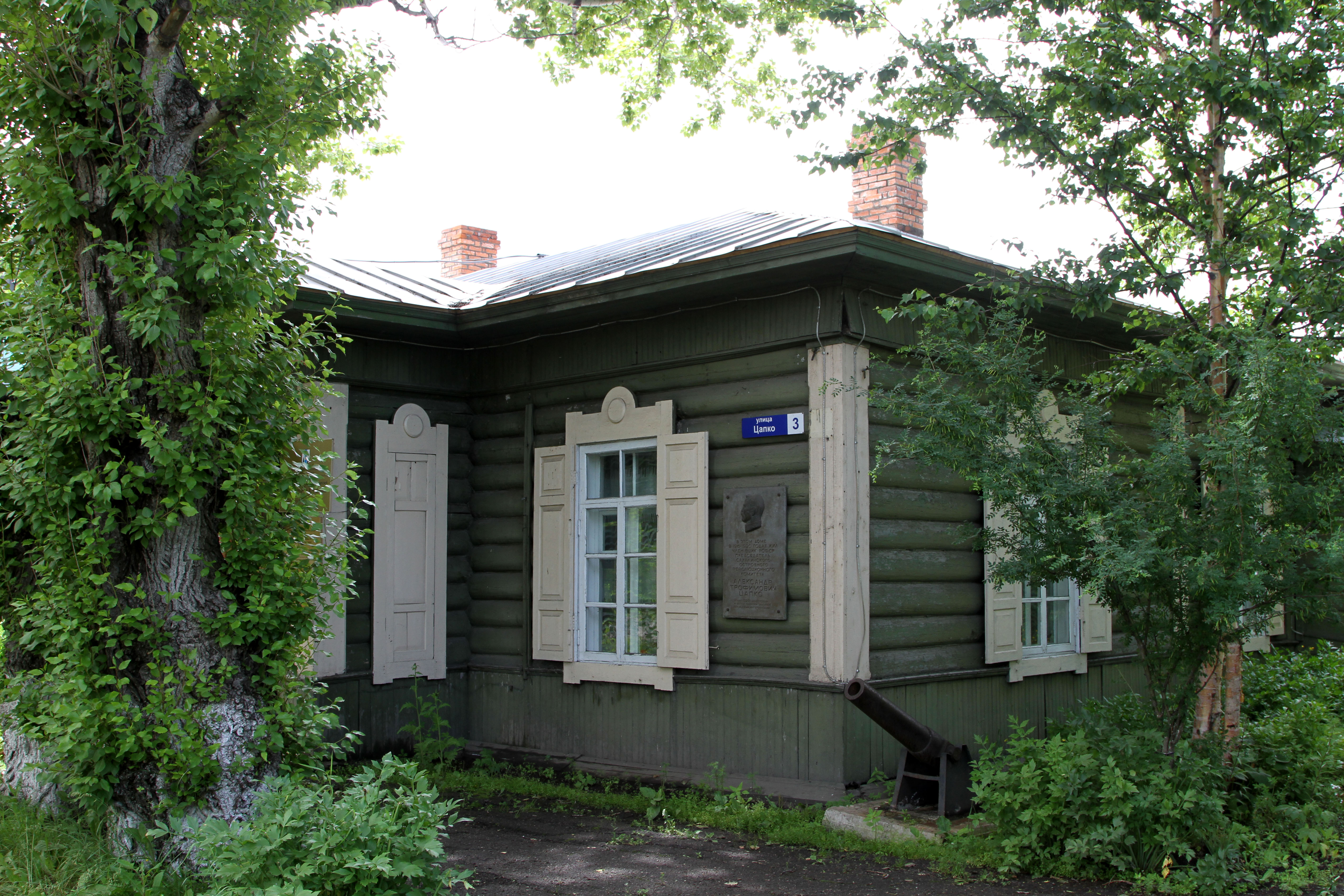
Alexander Tsapko's home in Alexandrovsk-Sakhalinsky

Alexander Tsapko was born in Odesa to a Russian peasant family in 1884. His father's death shortly after his birth resulted in him being raised by his single mother. In May 1906, he completed training for Russia's postal and telegraph service. Tsapko would be sent to Khabarovsk as a junior telegraph mechanic, where he constructed radio stations in the Russian Far East.

In 1912, Tsapko was promoted to provincial secretary. On January 5, 1916, he was sent to Sakhalin for the construction of a radio station in Alexandrovsky (today Alexandrovsk-Sakhalinsky). Upon the station's completion, he was placed in charge of it.

== Revolutionary activities ==
During his student years, Tsapko participated in revolutionary demonstrations. Following the February Revolution, he became chairman of Sakhalin's Public Safety Committee. On May 17, 1917, he was sent to Petrograd as a delegate to the First All-Russian Congress of Postal and Telegraph Employees. While there, Tsapko was elected to the All-Russian Central Executive Committee. He stayed in the city for the remainder of 1917, and was present during the October Revolution. Tsapko departed from Petrograd in May 1918.

Upon his return to Sakhalin on August 1, 1918, Tsapko resumed operating Alexandrovsky's radio station. While back on the island, he claimed to not side with any party "on principle." But when 18 Bolshevik prisoners were relocated to Sakhalin in the latter half of 1919, he led an underground group which established contacts with them. On January 14, 1920, a revolt against the White government in the Russian Far East created the Zemstvo of Maritime Territory. Two weeks later, a provisional executive committee on Sakhalin followed with Tsapko as chairman and Grigori Voitinsky acting as his deputy.

As chairman, Tsapko ordered the restoration of the eight-hour workday, the arrests of White government representatives, and the creation of a volunteer militia unit to replace northern Sakhalin's police force.

In March 1920, Yakov Tryapitsyn's capture of Nikolayevsk-on-Amur and the ensuing Nikolayevsk incident allowed his forces to exercise authority over northern Sakhalin. The creation of a Soviet resulted in the sidelining of the provisional executive committee, and by extension Tsapko, from any further decision-making.

== Under Japanese occupation ==
In reaction to the Nikolayevsk incident, Japanese forces prepared to occupy northern Sakhalin. While Tryapitsyn's allies fled the island, Alexander Tsapko remained. This decision was motivated by the trust and popularity he held with the local population, and the presence of his wife and daughter on the island.

When the IJN cruiser Mishima arrived in the port of Alexandrovsky, Tsapko arrived at the ship to lodge a protest.The Japanese military began its occupation of northern Sakhalin on April 21, 1920.

Despite the occupation and Tsapko being placed under surveillance, the provisional executive committee continued operating. This modus vivendi lasted until three days prior to the election of Alexandrovsk's city duma. On May 17, 1920, Tsapko was arrested alongside the committee's members, former Red militiamen, and Soviet sympathizers. All of these detainees would be taken aboard the Mishima.

== Death ==
Accounts vary as to the circumstances of Tsapko's fate. With some claiming he was shot or tortured by the Japanese. Another states he was thrown overboard the Mishima and drowned. What is known is that of the prisoners released from Japanese custody several months after their arrest in May 1920, Alexander Tsapko was not among them.

== Memorials ==
- In 1946, following the annexation of Karafuto Prefecture to the Soviet Union, the settlement of Ebikenai was renamed Tsapko.
- In 1989, a bust of Alexander Tsapko was erected in a Yuzhno-Sakhalinsk park.
