= Joint Executive Committee =

Russian Revolution organization

The Joint Executive Committee (Russian: Объединённый исполнительный комитет, abbreviated ОИК, 'OIK') was an organ of soviet power in the Russian Far East during the 1917 revolution. OIK was formed on 29 August 1917 at a meeting in Vladivostok. OIK included members of the executive committee of the Vladivostok Soviet, the Executive Bureau of the Maritime Province Soviet of Peasants Deputies, the Vladivostok city government and city duma, the Central Trade Union Bureau, the Military Commission of the Vladivostok Soviet, the Central Committee of the Siberian Flotilla and the regional Public Safety Committee (KOB). Members of all the socialist parties were represented in OIK. S. N. Mikhalov, of the Socialist-Revolutionary Party, became the chairman of OIK. The Menshevik-Internationalist K. A. Sukhanov became the deputy chairman. M. A. Iglovskaya, also from the SR Party, became the secretary of OIK.

OIK moved to overtake the daily governing affairs and policing in Vladivostok, but the Commissioner of the Provisional Government A. N. Rusanov refused to acknowledge the legitimacy of OIK.
