= Amur-Ussuri Cossacks =

The Amur-Ussuri Cossacks are the combined peoples of the Amur Cossack Host and the Ussuri Cossack Host. Early in their history they intermarried with or incorporated into their units many Tungusic peoples. This was a key element in their considering themselves a separate people from other Cossacks.

== Sources ==
- Olson, James S., An Ethnohistorical Dictionary of the Russian and Soviet Empires. (Westport: Greenwood Press, 1994) p. 35
