= Sakhalin Province Expeditionary Army =

- 薩哈嗹州派遣軍
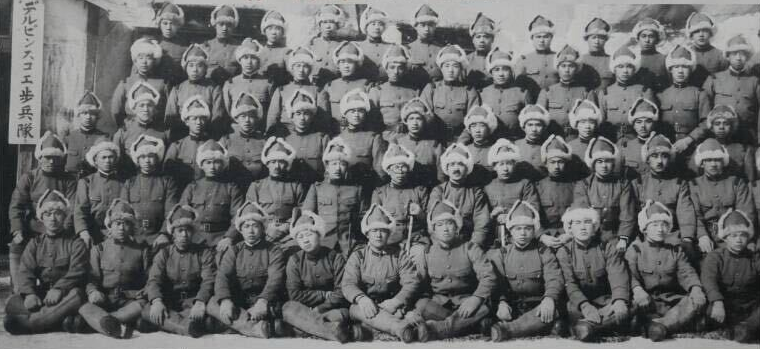
- Infantry unit in Derbinskoye c. 1920-1923
- Active: July 29 1920
- Disbanded: May 25 1925
- Country: Imperial Japan
- Branch: Imperial Japanese Army
- Type: Field Army
- Garrison/HQ: Alexandrovsk-Sakhalinsky
- Engagements: Japanese intervention in Siberia

The Sakhalin Province Expeditionary Army（Japanese: 薩哈嗹州派遣軍）was a field army belonging to the Imperial Japanese Army which facilitated the Japanese occupation of northern Sakhalin.

== History ==
In 1920, during Japan's Siberian Intervention in the Russian Civil War, the Nikolayevsk incident occurred. This incident gave Japan the pretext to occupy northern Sakhalin, which bordered Karafuto prefecture. Sakhalin north of the 50th parallel was nominally controlled by the Far Eastern Republic. The Republic did not possess the requisite military force to resist Japanese occupation. The expeditionary army was formed in July 1920 after Japanese troops landed in Alexandrovsk-Sakhalinsky.

In October 1922, an aviation unit was formed within the Sakhalin Expeditionary Force. Initially consisting of three Otsu 1 (Salmson 2A2) aircraft. The aviation unit was stationed at Ruikovskoye (present-day Kirovskoe, near Zonalnoye Airport) and an emergency landing site at Derbinskoye (present-day Tymovskoye). It would carry out search and rescue missions, liaison duties, and aerial demonstrations.

In January 1923, a Yamashita Steamship being used by the Imperial Japanese Navy named the Chūka Maru was stranded off the northwestern coast of Sakhalin after getting caught in ice. The icebreaker Ōtomari and the seaplane tender Wakamiya performed rescue operations.

The army would be demobilized in May 1925, following the signing of the Soviet–Japanese Basic Convention.

== Army composition ==
=== Headquarters ===
- Commanding Officer
  - Lieutenant General Sojiro Kojima：1920 July 29-
  - Lieutenant General Keiu Machida：1921 June 15 -
  - Major General Kazutsgu Inoue：1923 April 1 - 1925 May 25
- Chief of Staff
  - Major General Kazusuge Tsuno：1920 July 29 -
  - Major General Hyousaburo Matsui：1921 September 1 -
  - Vacant：1923 April 1 -
  - Colonel Eiki Sato：1923 August 6 - 1925 May 25
- High-ranking staff officer
  - Colonel Jirō Tamon：1920 July 30 -
- Head of Military Government
  - Major General Shunji Takasu：1922 November 24 -

=== Subdivisions ===
- Sakhalin Province Expeditionary Army Kempeitai
- Sakhalin Province Expeditionary Army field hospital
- 13th Infantry Brigade（Ashikawa）
  - 25th Infantry Regiment (Sapporo)
  - 26th Infantry Regiment (Ashikawa)

== See also ==
- Siberian Intervention
- Nikolayevsk Incident
- Soviet–Japanese Basic Convention
- Okha Oil Field
- Northern Sea fisheries
- 13th Division (Imperial Japanese Army)
- 88th Division (Imperial Japanese Army)
