= Oleksandr Rezanov =

Soviet handball player (1948–2024)

Olympic medal record

Representing the Soviet Union

Olympic Games

Men's Handball
Gold medal – first place	1976 Montreal	Team

World Championship
Silver medal – second place	1978 Denmark	Team

Oleksandr Hennadiyovych Rezanov (Ukrainian: Олександр Геннадійович Рєзанов; 6 October 1948 – 5 September 2024) was a Soviet and Ukrainian handball player who competed in the 1972 Summer Olympics and in the 1976 Summer Olympics. He was born in Alexandrovsk-Sakhalinsky, RSFSR.

In 1972, he was part of the Soviet team, which finished fifth. He played all six matches and scored three goals.

Later in 1976 he won the gold medal with the Soviet team. He played all six matches and scored three goals again.

Rezanov died on 5 September 2024, at the age of 75.
