= Sergey Rozanov (1869) =

Russian lieutenant general (1869–1937)

Sergey Nikolaevich Rozanov
- Сергей Николаевич Розанов
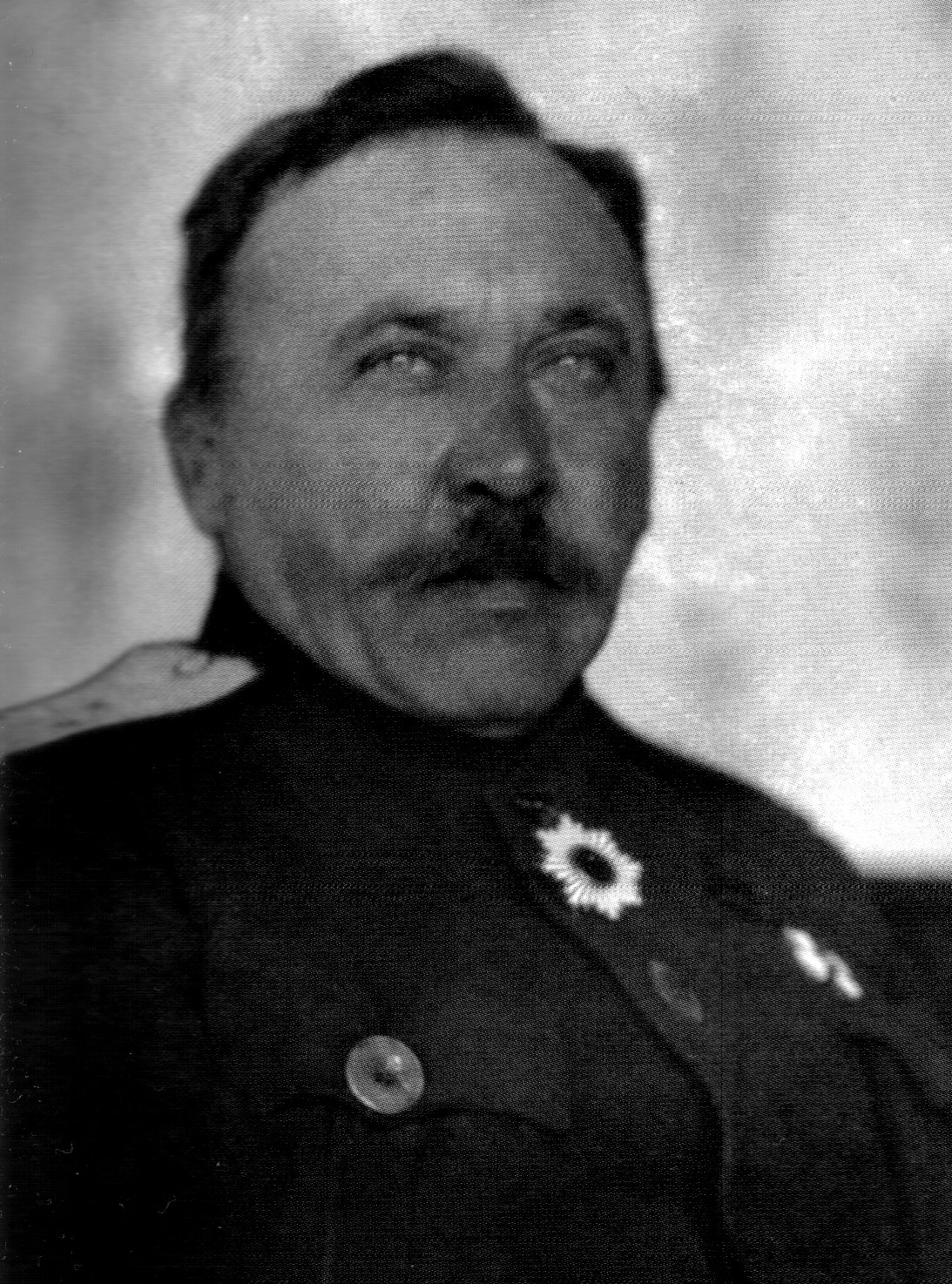
- Born: September 24, 1869; Russian Empire
- Died: August 28, 1937 (aged 67); Meudon, Department of Hauts–de–Seine, France
- Military career
- Allegiance: Russian Empire; Russian State
- Branch: Infantry
- Rank: Lieutenant general
- Conflicts: Russo-Japanese War; World War I Russian Civil War
- Awards: Order of Saint George; Order of Saint Vladimir; Order of Saint Anna; Order of Saint Stanislaus

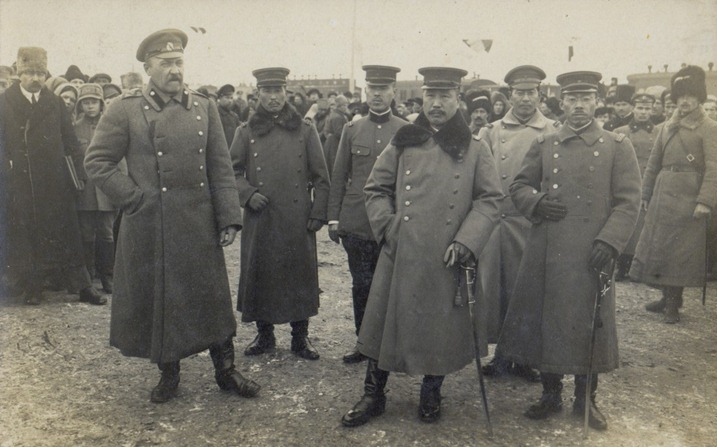
Lieutenant General Sergey Rozanov with the Japanese military

Sergei Nikolaevich Rozanov (Russian: Сергей Николаевич Розанов; September 24, 1869 – August 28, 1937) was a lieutenant general, a leader of the White movement.

== Biography ==
Educated at the 3rd Moscow Cadet Corps and the Mikhailovsky Artillery School. Released to the 3rd Reserve Artillery Brigade. Later he served in the 1st Grenadier Artillery Brigade. Second Lieutenant (seniority on August 10, 1889). Lieutenant (seniority on August 7, 1891). Headquarters Captain (seniority on July 28, 1896).

In 1897, he graduated from the Nikolaev Academy of the General Staff in the first category.

From May 6, 1898 – Chief Officer for assignments at the headquarters of the Kiev Military District. He served the census command of the company in the 132nd Infantry Regiment of Bendery (October 25, 1900 – October 25, 1901). From October 25, 1901 – Headquarters Officer for assignments at the headquarters of the Kiev Military District. From September 2, 1903 – Head of the General Staff.

Member of the Russian–Japanese War: from October 12, 1904, Senior Adjutant of the Quartermaster General of the 2nd Manchurian Army. From May 1, 1906 – clerk of the Main Directorate of the General Staff.

On July 14, 1910, he was appointed commander of the 178th Wenden Infantry Regiment.

=== World War I ===
He entered the First World War with the regiment. In September 1914, he was put at the head of the 2nd Brigade of the 45th Infantry Division.

From January 19, 1915 – Chief of Staff of the 3rd Caucasian Army Corps (Corps Commander Vladimir Irmanov). Major General (1916).

In 1917, Rozanov's career made a big leap: on February 18, he became commander of the 162nd Infantry Division, and on August 25, the 41st Army Corps. During Kornilov's Revolt, Rozanov proved his loyalty to the Provisional Government, and on September 2, the 7th Army Commissar even asked Petrograd to appoint Rozanov as commander of the army instead of the compromised General Vladimir Selivachev.

=== Civil War ===
In 1918, he entered the service in the Red Army, was appointed to the management of the All–Russian General Staff, but in September 1918 in the Volga Region, he went over to the side of the anti–Bolshevik Samara Government. From September 25 to November 18, 1918 – Acting Chief of Staff of the Supreme Commander–in–Chief of All Armed Forces of the Committee of Members of the Constituent Assembly (Ufa Directory), General Boldyrev.

In November 1918 – in Omsk. He was a supporter of a military dictatorship, but of the available candidates for the role of dictator, he preferred General Boldyrev. After Admiral Alexander Kolchak came to power, he was dismissed on sick leave. On December 22, 1918, he was enlisted in the reserve of ranks at the headquarters of the Omsk Military District.

On March 13, 1919, he arrived at the disposal of the commander of the Irkutsk Military District. On March 31, he was appointed Governor General of the Yenisei Governorate and Special Commissioner for the Protection of State Order and Public Peace in the Yenisei Governorate. Defeated the main centers of the partisan movement in Eastern Siberia. During his command, Rozanov issued orders to brutally repress resistance.

"Those villages whose population meets troops with arms, burn down the villages and shoot the adult males without exception. If hostages are taken in cases of resistance to government troops, shoot the hostages without mercy."

From July 18, 1919, to January 31, 1920 – the Chief of the Amur Region. On September 26, in Vladivostok, Rozanov received a demand from the inter–union committee of military representatives to withdraw Russian troops from Vladivostok, accompanied by the threat of the use of military force. Rozanov requested Omsk by telegraph and received an order from Kolchak to leave the troops in Vladivostok, which he did. Rozanov legalized the ataman administration, appointing Semyonov and Kalmykov as commissioners for the protection of public order with the rights of governors general.

In October 1919, Rozanov informed Kolchak about the growth of opposition sentiments towards the Omsk Government in the region and about the impending uprising against the government headed by Gaida. On November 17–18, 1919, when the uprising of Gaida and his supporters (Socialist Revolutionaries and Czechs) in Vladivostok nevertheless took place, Rozanov pulled back from suppressing the uprising and, contrary to Kolchak's orders, released the rebel Gaida from the city.

During the anti–Kolchak coup in Irkutsk, the manifesto of the Political Center declared Rozanov an enemy of the people.

After the uprising in Vladivostok on January 31, 1920, he left for Japan. Later he lived in Beijing and then in France. He died in Meudon in 1937.

== Awards ==
- Order of Saint Stanislaus, 3rd Class (1901);
- Order of Saint Stanislaus, 2nd Class With Swords (1906);
- Order of Saint Vladimir, 4th Class With Swords And Bow (1906);
- Order of Saint Anna, 2nd Class With Swords (1907);
- Order of Saint Vladimir, 3rd Class (1908);
- Order of Saint George, 4th Class (Highest Order on February 3, 1915) – for the battle on August 25–26, 1914, near the village of Bystrzyce;
- George's Weapon (Highest Order on May 5, 1915);
- Order of Saint Stanislaus, 1st Class With Swords (Highest Order on October 22, 1915);
- Order of Saint Anna, 1st Class With Swords (April 19, 1916).

== Sources ==
- Zvyagin S. P. General Sergey Rozanov: Reconstruction of the Biography // From the History of the Civil War in the Far East (1918–1922): Collection of Scientific Articles. Issue 4 / Editor Sergey Savchenko. Khabarovsk: Regional Museum of Local Lore Named After Nikolai Grodekov, 2004. Pages 203–216
- Konstantin Zalessky. Who Was Who in the First World War – Moscow: AST; Astrel, 2003 – 896 Pages – 5,000 Copies – ISBN 5-17-019670-9 – ISBN 5-271-06895-1
- Evgeny Volkov, Nikolay Egorov, Ivan Kuptsov (2003). White Generals of the Eastern Front of the Civil War. Moscow: Russian Way.
- Pyotr Vologodsky (2006). In Power and in Exile: Diary of the Prime Minister of Anti–Bolshevik Governments and an Emigrant in China (1918–1925). Ryazan.
- "Sergey Rozanov (1869)" (in Russian). «Russian army in a Great war» project.
- State Archives of the Russian Federation. Fund of Manuscripts 200. Inventory 1. Case 118. Sheet 93
