= Alexandrovsk-Sakhalinsky (town) =

Town in Sakhalin Oblast, Russia

Alexandrovsk-Sakhalinsky Александровск-Сахалинский
- Town
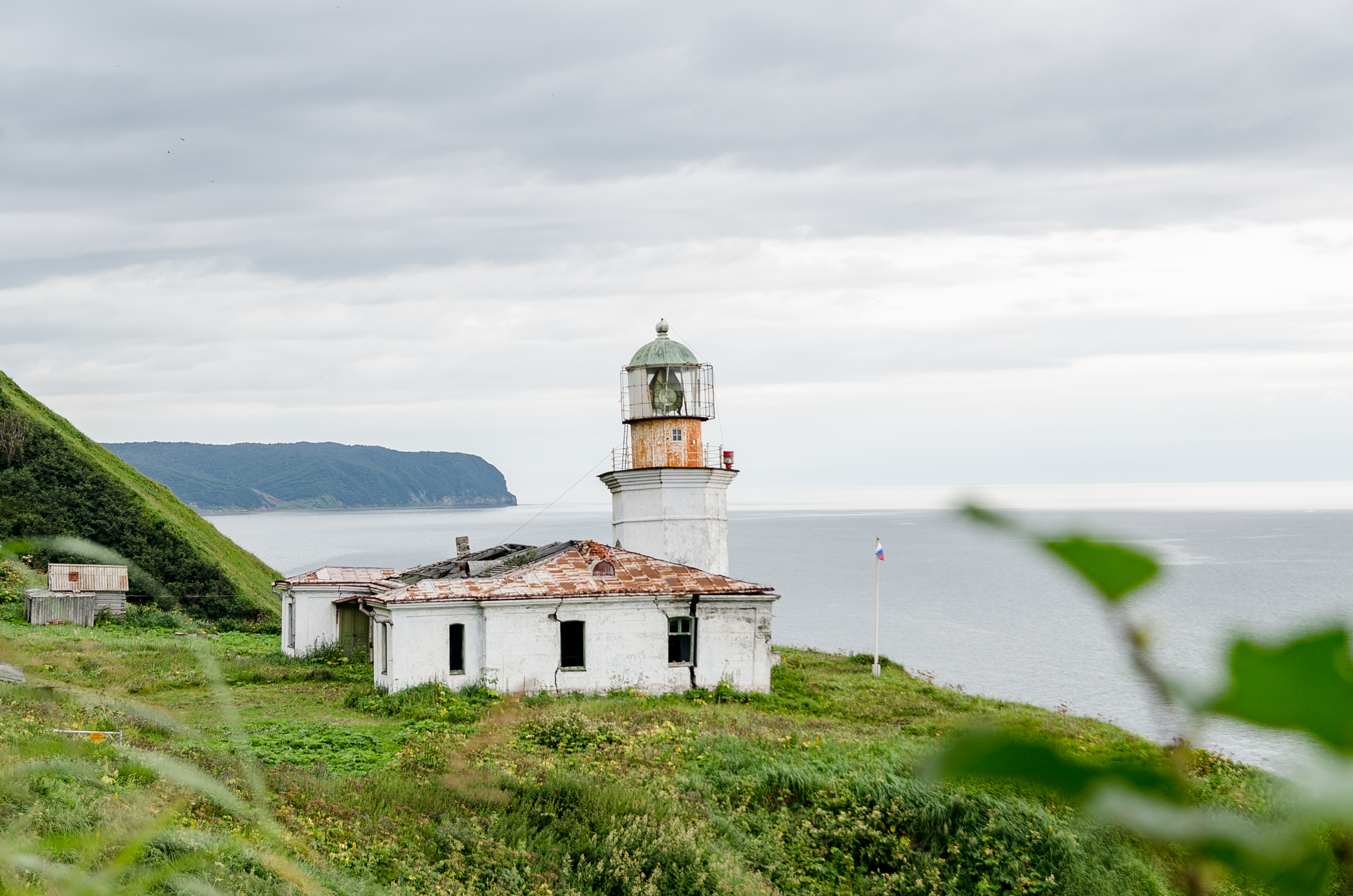

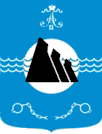
- Coat of arms
- Interactive map of Alexandrovsk-Sakhalinsky
- Location of Alexandrovsk-Sakhalinsky Alexandrovsk-Sakhalinsky (Sakhalin Oblast)
- Coordinates: 50°54′N 142°09′E
- Country: Russia
- Federal subject: Sakhalin Oblast
- Administrative district: Alexandrovsk-Sakhalinsky District
- Founded: 1862
- Town status since: 1917
- Elevation: 10 m (33 ft)

Population (2010 Census)
  - Total: 10,613
  - Estimate (2025): 8,529 (−19.6%)

Administrative status
  - Capital of: Alexandrovsk-Sakhalinsky District

Municipal status
  - Urban okrug: Alexandrovsk-Sakhalinsky Urban Okrug
  - Capital of: Alexandrovsk-Sakhalinsky Urban Okrug
- Time zone: UTC+11 (MSK+8)
- Postal code: 694420–694424
- Dialing code: +7 42434
- OKTMO ID: 64704000001
- Website: aleksandrovsk.tfd.ru

Alexandrovsk-Sakhalinsky (Russian: Алекса́ндровск-Сахали́нский; Japanese: 落石Otchishi, 亜港Akō) is a town in Sakhalin Oblast, Russia, located near the Strait of Tartary on the western shores of northern Sakhalin Island at the foot of the western Sakhalin mountains. Population: 10,613 (2010 census); 12,826 (2002 census); 19,166 (1989 Soviet census); 21,000 (1968).

== History ==
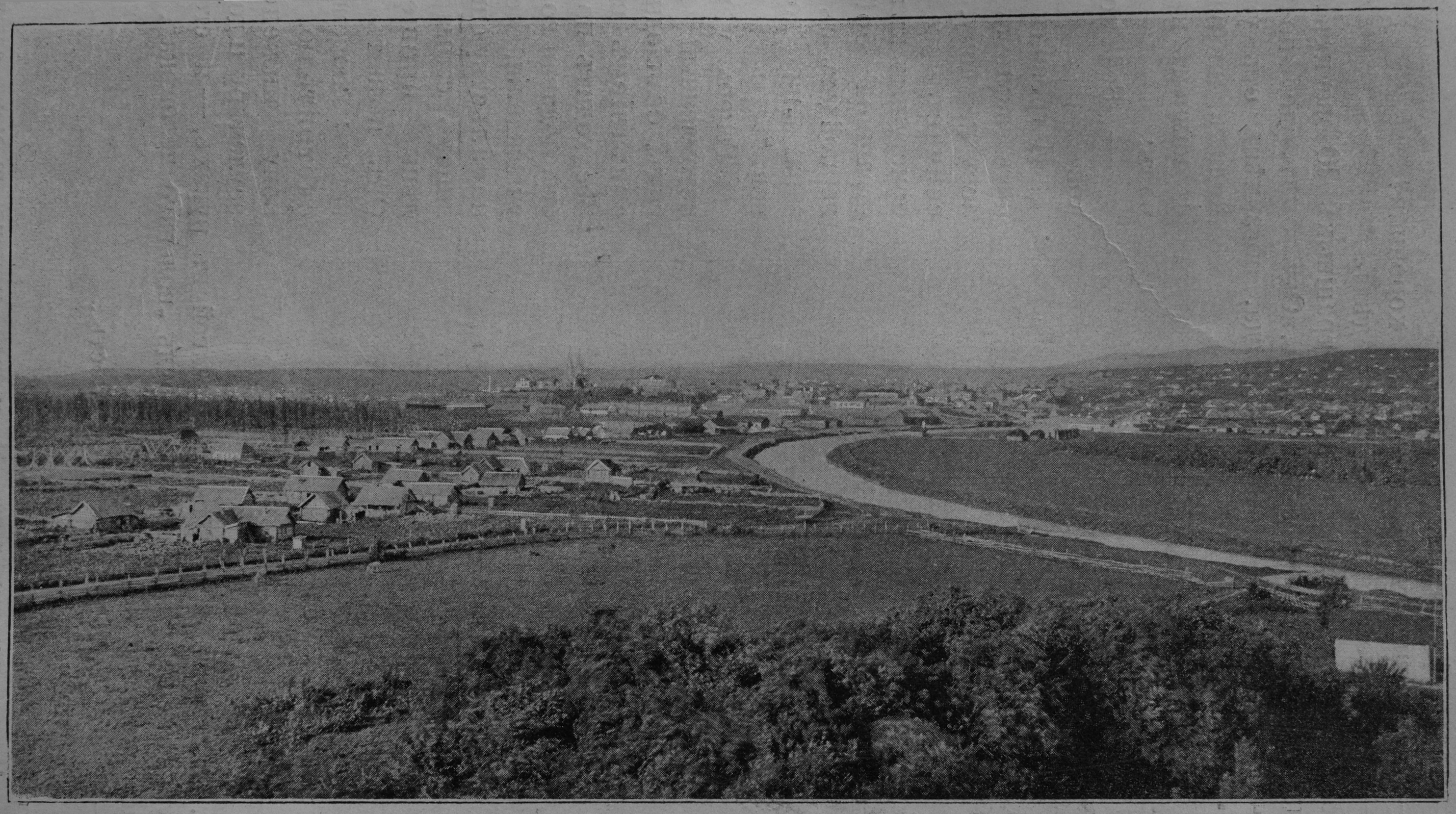
Early 20th-century view of Alexandrovsky

A settlement called Alexandrovskaya on the present site of the town was first recorded in 1862. In 1869, an agricultural farm was established there, which later grew into the village of Alexandrovka. At the time, it was known as Otchishi (落石, Ochīshi) among Japanese.

In 1881, a military post was established and became known as Alexandrovsky. The outpost served as the administrative center for managing katorga, prisons, exile settlements, and the whole island until the October Revolution. Anton Chekhov lived here in 1890 while gathering material for his book The Sakhalin Island. According to the 1897 census, the settlement had a population of 3,860, 87% male and 13% female, and 69,6% Russian, 6.9% Tatar, 6.8% Polish, 5.5% Ukrainian, 1.5% German, 1.2% Armenian, 1.2% Jewish, 1.1% Circassian.

Town status was granted to Alexandrovsky in 1917. During the Russian Civil War the town was governed by Alexander Tsapko, the town's radio operator. It fell under the jurisdiction of White Russia until January 1920. An urprising resulted in Tsapko aligning northern Sakhalin with the Zemstvo of Maritime Territory. His governance would come to an end when Alexandrovsk was occupied by the Japanese in April 1920. During the occupation, it was known as Akō (亜港町, Akō-chō; lit. 'A-Port City')

In 1926, the town was renamed Alexandrovsk-Sakhalinsky to distinguish it from other places named Alexandrovsk.

Alexandrovsk-Sakhalinsky was the administrative center of Sakhalin Oblast between 1932 and 1947. It was also known as the coal mining center of the island during Soviet times.

== Administrative and municipal status ==
Within the framework of administrative divisions, Alexandrovsk-Sakhalinsky serves as the administrative center of Alexandrovsk-Sakhalinsky District and is subordinated to it. As a municipal division, the town of Alexandrovsk-Sakhalinsky and thirteen rural localities of Alexandrovsk-Sakhalinsky District are incorporated as Alexandrovsk-Sakhalinsky Urban Okrug.

== Economy and infrastructure ==
The economy of Alexandrovsk-Sakhalinsky is mainly reliant on its harbor, the oldest and previously most important on Sakhalin, and the mining of black coal in the local area.

== Climate ==
Alexandrovsk-Sakhalinsky has a humid continental climate (Köppen climate classification Dfb) with short mild to warm summers and long, very cold winters.

Climate data for Alexandrovsk-Sakhalinsky (1991–2020, extremes 1881–present)
| Month | Jan | Feb | Mar | Apr | May | Jun | Jul | Aug | Sep | Oct | Nov | Dec | Year |
|---|---|---|---|---|---|---|---|---|---|---|---|---|---|
| Record high °C (°F) | 4.7 (40.5) | 5.4 (41.7) | 11.4 (52.5) | 20.9 (69.6) | 28.1 (82.6) | 29.4 (84.9) | 32.0 (89.6) | 31.3 (88.3) | 28.6 (83.5) | 21.2 (70.2) | 13.8 (56.8) | 5.7 (42.3) | 32.0 (89.6) |
| Mean daily maximum °C (°F) | −11.3 (11.7) | −9.7 (14.5) | −3.4 (25.9) | 4.0 (39.2) | 11.2 (52.2) | 16.0 (60.8) | 19.6 (67.3) | 20.6 (69.1) | 16.9 (62.4) | 9.1 (48.4) | −0.9 (30.4) | −8.6 (16.5) | 5.3 (41.5) |
| Daily mean °C (°F) | −15.4 (4.3) | −14.4 (6.1) | −7.6 (18.3) | 0.1 (32.2) | 6.3 (43.3) | 11.4 (52.5) | 15.5 (59.9) | 16.7 (62.1) | 12.7 (54.9) | 5.4 (41.7) | −3.9 (25.0) | −12.0 (10.4) | 1.2 (34.2) |
| Mean daily minimum °C (°F) | −19.4 (−2.9) | −18.8 (−1.8) | −12.1 (10.2) | −3.4 (25.9) | 2.4 (36.3) | 7.6 (45.7) | 12.0 (53.6) | 13.3 (55.9) | 9.0 (48.2) | 2.0 (35.6) | −6.9 (19.6) | −15.4 (4.3) | −2.5 (27.5) |
| Record low °C (°F) | −41.0 (−41.8) | −37.3 (−35.1) | −34.2 (−29.6) | −25.9 (−14.6) | −8.9 (16.0) | −2.4 (27.7) | 0.5 (32.9) | 1.5 (34.7) | −2.5 (27.5) | −15.0 (5.0) | −26.0 (−14.8) | −36.9 (−34.4) | −41.0 (−41.8) |
| Average precipitation mm (inches) | 48 (1.9) | 31 (1.2) | 35 (1.4) | 34 (1.3) | 52 (2.0) | 45 (1.8) | 52 (2.0) | 96 (3.8) | 90 (3.5) | 88 (3.5) | 65 (2.6) | 70 (2.8) | 706 (27.8) |
| Average extreme snow depth cm (inches) | 27 (11) | 37 (15) | 41 (16) | 13 (5.1) | 0 (0) | 0 (0) | 0 (0) | 0 (0) | 0 (0) | 1 (0.4) | 6 (2.4) | 17 (6.7) | 41 (16) |
| Average rainy days | 0.2 | 0.04 | 0.3 | 7 | 17 | 15 | 16 | 19 | 20 | 19 | 5 | 1 | 120 |
| Average snowy days | 26 | 24 | 20 | 15 | 6 | 0.03 | 0 | 0 | 0.2 | 9 | 25 | 28 | 153 |
| Average relative humidity (%) | 80 | 79 | 75 | 74 | 76 | 80 | 84 | 82 | 79 | 74 | 75 | 80 | 78 |
| Mean monthly sunshine hours | 100 | 134 | 185 | 189 | 215 | 252 | 214 | 202 | 180 | 127 | 78 | 57 | 1,933 |
Source 1: Pogoda.ru.net
Source 2: NOAA (sun, 1961–1990)

== Gallery ==
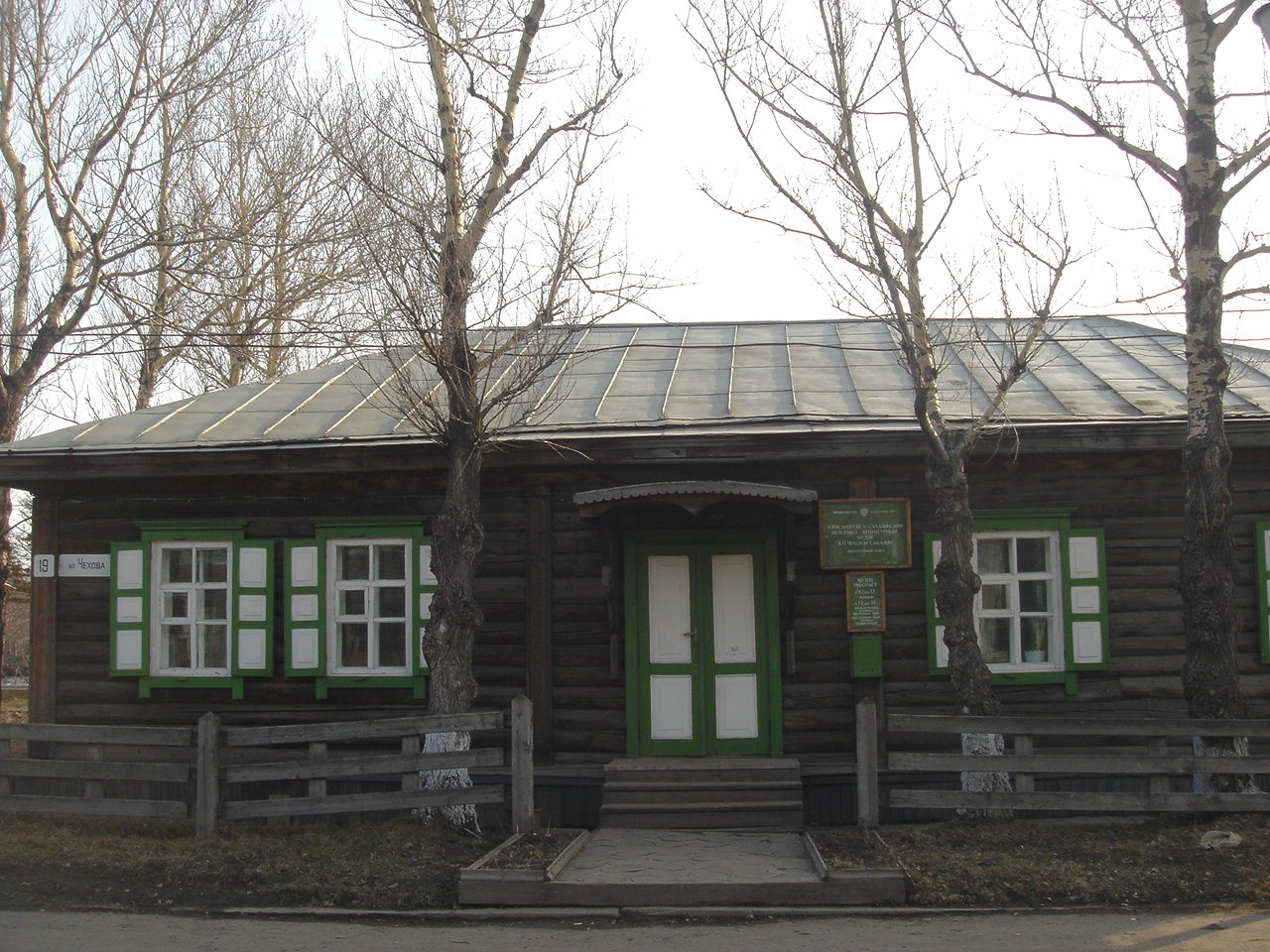
Anton Chekhov museum in Alexandrovsk-Sakhalinsky. It is the house where he stayed in Sakhalin during 1890

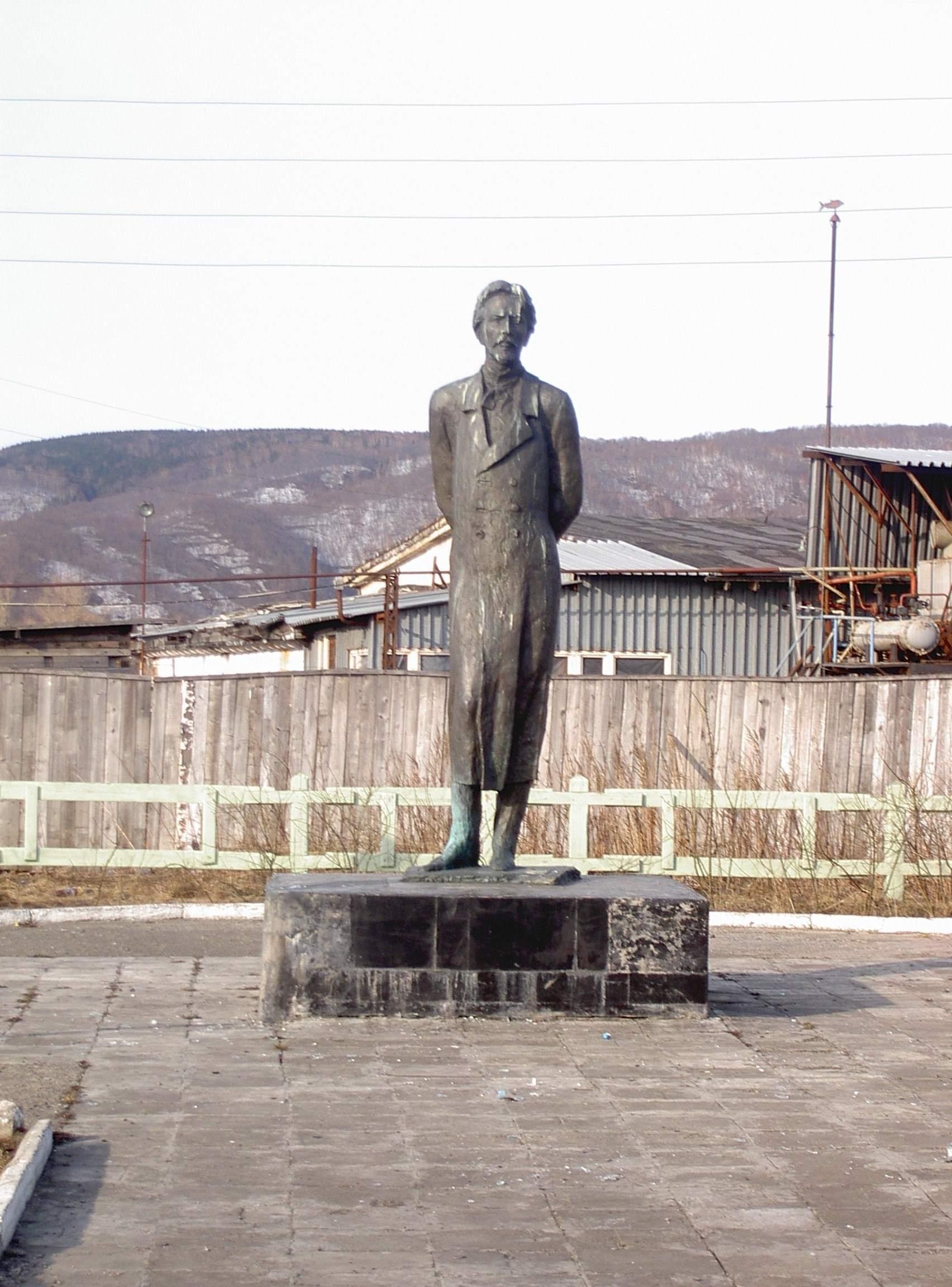
Anton Chekhov monument in Alexandrovsk-Sakhalinsky

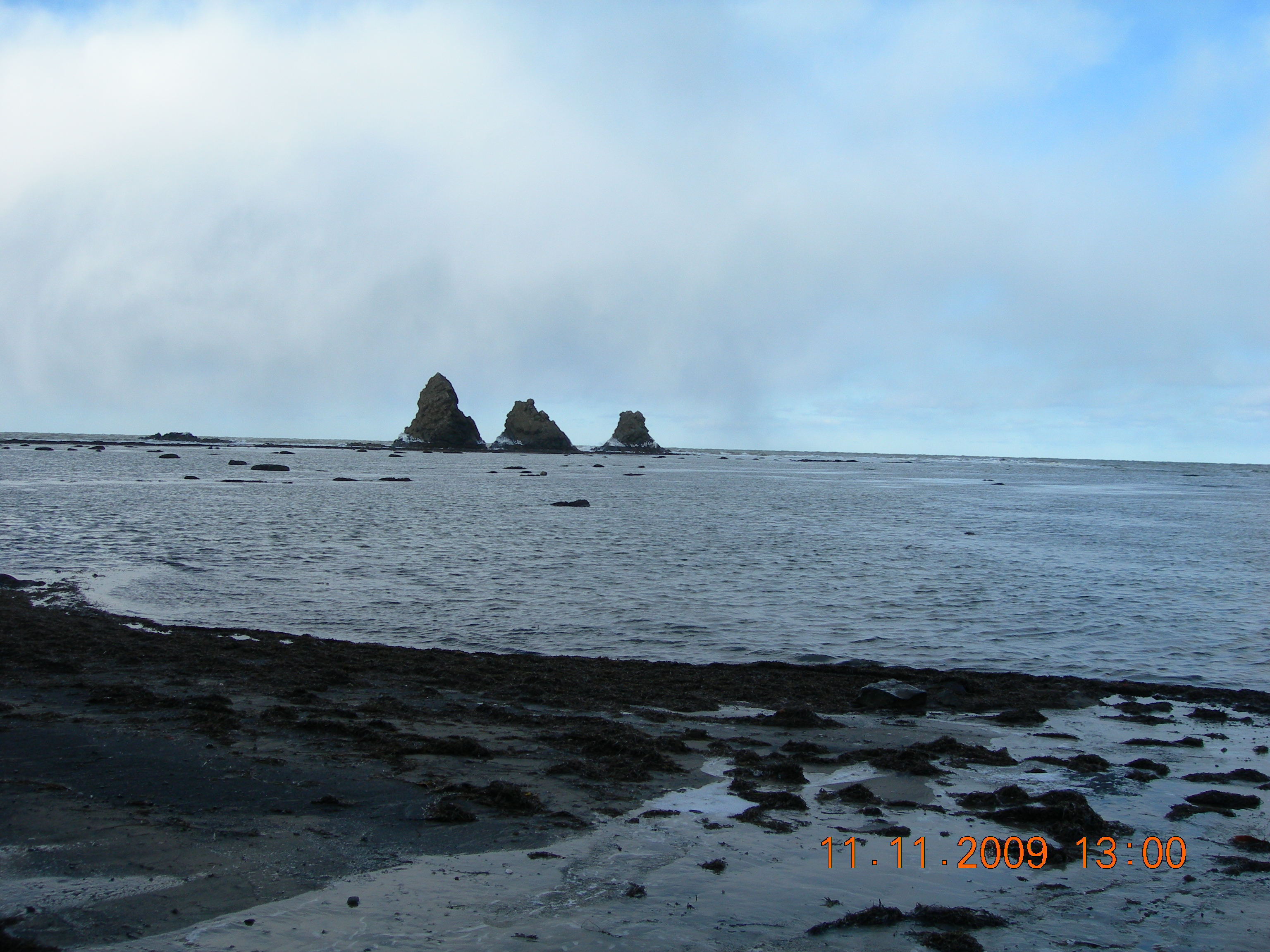
"Three Brothers" rocks in Alexandrovsk-Sakhalinsky

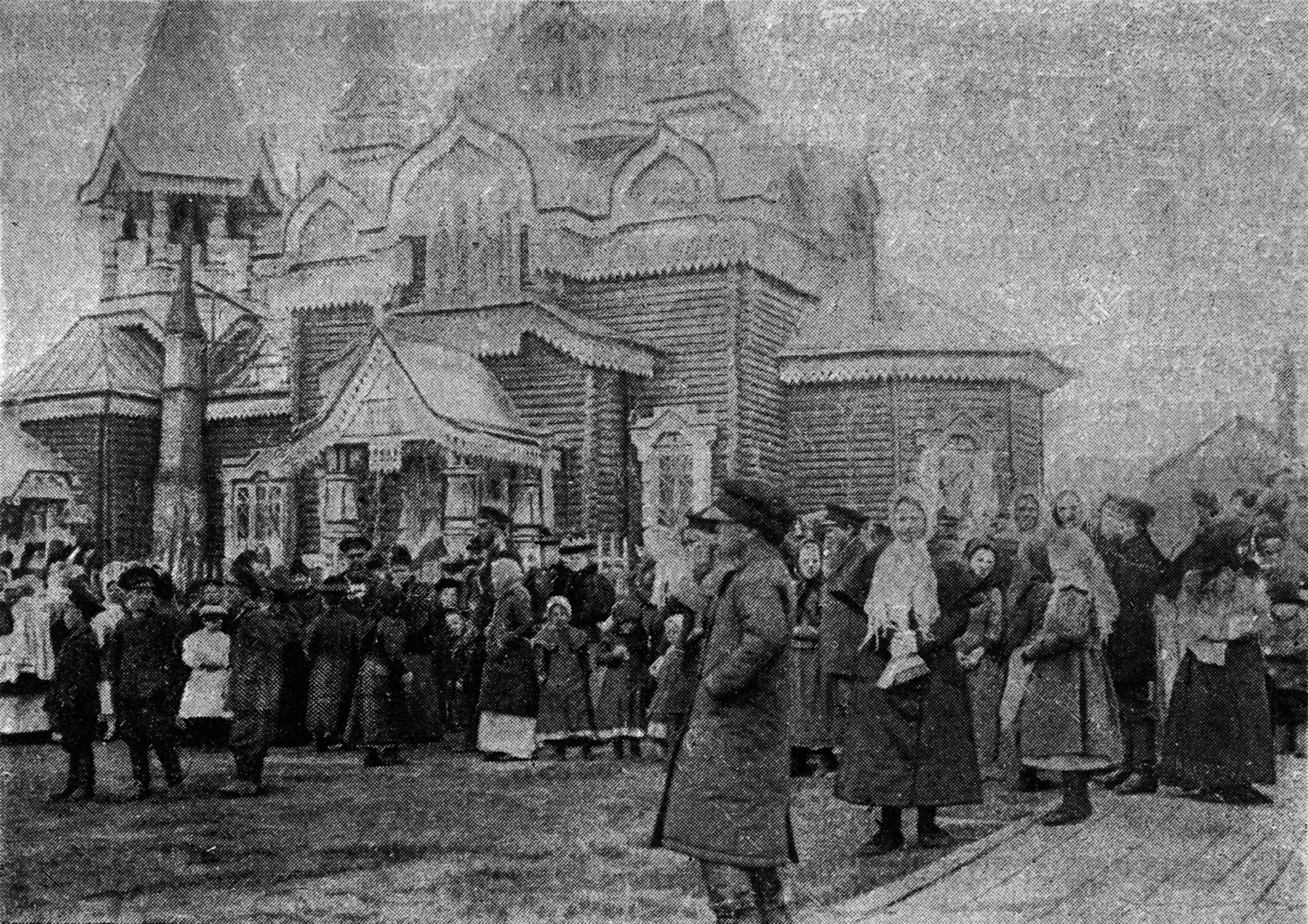
Settler's way of life. Near church at holiday. 1903

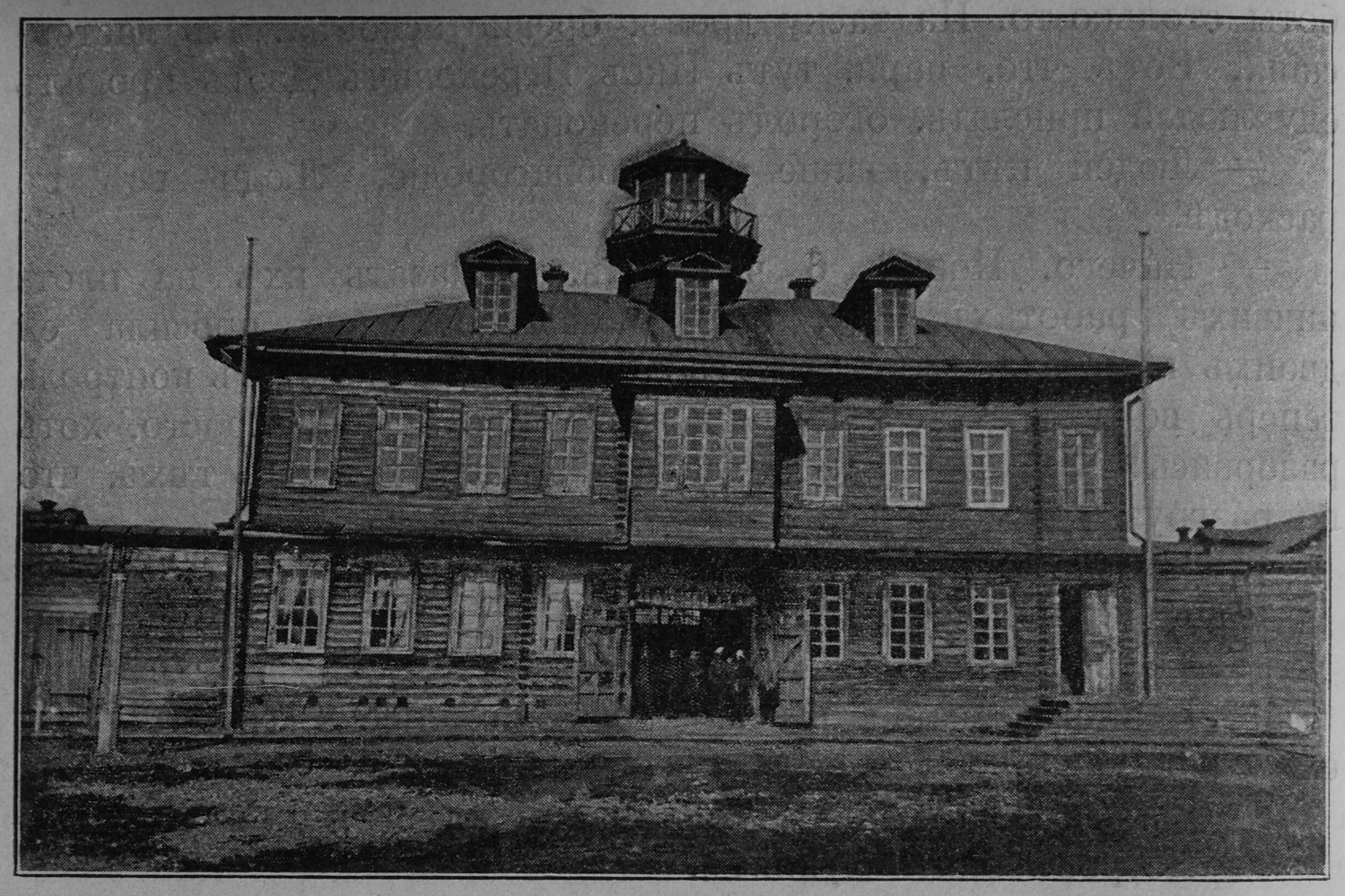
Aleksandrovskaya Prison in Alexandrovsk-Sakhalinsky in 1903

== Notable people ==
- Oleksandr Gennadiyevich Rezanov (October 14, 1948 - September 5, 2024), in Alexandrovsk-Sakhalinsky, RSFSR) was a former Soviet handball player who competed in the 1972 Summer Olympics and in the 1976 Summer Olympics.
