= City duma =

City-level representative assembly in Russia

A city duma (Russian: Городская дума) is a city-level legislature in Russia, first established in the 18th century.

== Russian Empire ==
Originated in Russia on the basis of a decree issued on 21 April 1785 by Empress Catherine II "The instruments on the rights and benefits of the cities of the Russian Empire" which included the creation of the "General City Duma". General Duma has elected an executive body, "Шестигласная дума" consisting of the mayor and six councilors, one of six "bits" of urban inhabitants. "Шестигласная дума" have been replaced by "всесословные общие" and sometimes "распорядительные думa" (first in St. Petersburg (1846), Moscow (1862), and Odessa), and after the administrative reform in 1870, the City Duma in all the cities (in the small towns of the empire also used a simplified urban governance without the city Council).

== Russian Federation ==
In 1991 the Russian law "On Local Self-Government in the RSFSR" was adopted, which actually allowed the creation instead of the city councils of people's deputies of urban duma. In 2003, a new federal law ("On General Principles of Local Government in the Russian Federation" dated 06.10.2003, № 131-FZ), under which the exclusive competence of the City Council are:

- adoption of the charter of the city and the introduction of changes and additions.
- approval of the municipal budget and a report on its implementation.
- establishment, modification and cancellation of local taxes and fees in accordance with federal law.
- adoption of plans and programs of the city, approval of reports on their performance.
- determination of the order management and disposition of property in the municipal property.
- determination of the order of decision-making on the establishment, reorganization and liquidation of municipal enterprises and institutions, as well as the establishment of tariffs for municipal enterprises and institutions.
- determination of the order of participation in organizations of inter-municipal cooperation.
- determine the order of logistical and organizational support of the local government.
- control over the execution of local authorities and officials of local self-government powers to address local issues.

== See also ==
- State Duma
- Regional parliaments of Russia
- Selsoviet
