= Maritime Regional Congress of Soviets of Peasant Deputies =

The Maritime Regional Congress of Soviets of Peasant Deputies was a body of peasant soviets (councils) in the Maritime Province of Russia.

The 2nd Maritime Regional Congress of Soviet of Peasant Deputies was held September 30-October 3, 1917. 564 delegates took part in the Congress. The Congress marked a split in Party of Socialists-Revolutionaries (SR) in the province. On the inaugural day of the meeting, SR party representatives were excluded from the Congress presidium with the argument that only genuine peasants would be allowed occupy leadership roles. The urban intellectual leaders of the SR party were marginalized at the venue. Preparing for the 1917 Russian Constituent Assembly election, the Congress declared that peasants should be fielded as candidates.

In the Constituent Assembly election, held two month later, the Maritime peasants' soviets fielded an independent list (List no. 2). List no. 2 was the most voted in the Amur-Maritime electoral district, obtaining 56,718 votes (27%).
