= Amur Cossacks =

Cossack host created in the Amur region

The Amur Cossack Host (Russian: Амурское казачье войско) was a Cossack host created in the Amur region and Primorye in the 1850s on the basis of the Cossacks relocated from the Transbaikal region and freed miners of Nerchinsk region.

== Early history ==
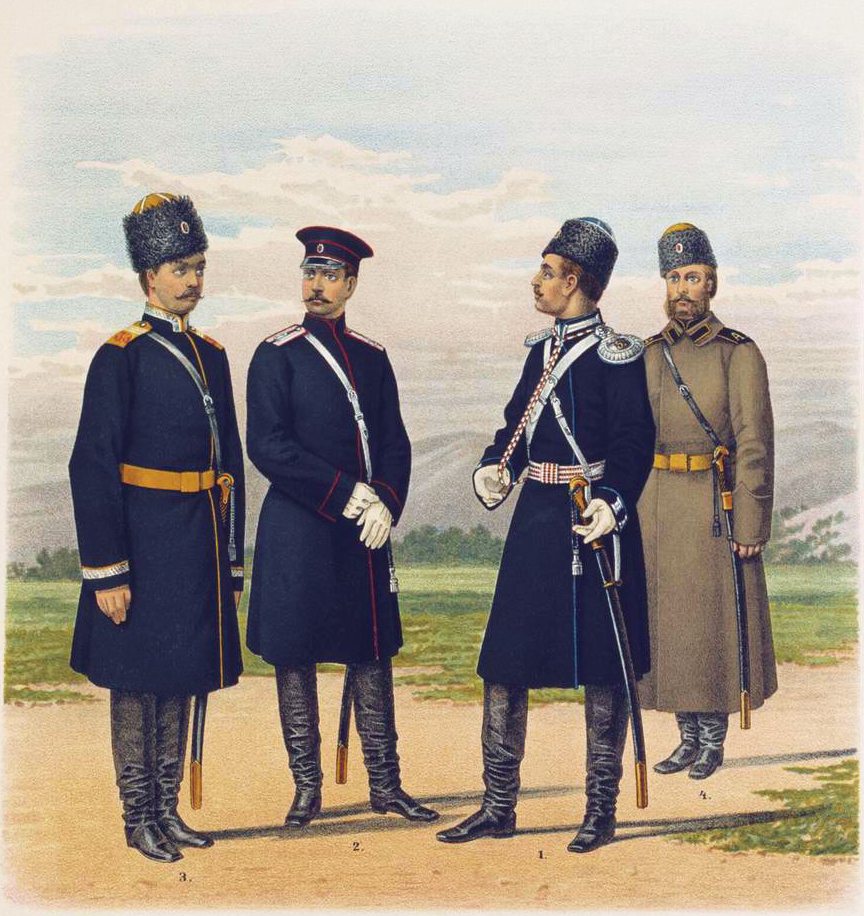
Different cossack hosts in the late 19th century. Figure at right in greatcoat is an Amur Cossack.

Their resettlement began in 1854. The first Cossack stanitsa (Khabarovskaya) was created in 1858. A decree announcing the creation of the Amur Cossack Host was issued in 1860. Initially the host was subordinate to the military governor of the Amur Oblast and Primorye. In 1879 it became responsible to the governor of the Amur Oblast. Subsequently, the Amur Cossack army became the responsibility of the Governor-General of the Amur region and the Commander of the armies of the military district of the Amur region (the latter was also the ataman of the Amur and Ussuri Cossack Hosts). The headquarters of the Amur Cossack Host was located in Blagoveshchensk.

== Region, resources and organisation ==
The Amur Cossack Host patrolled the borders along the Amur River and Ussuri River (in 1889, a separate Ussuri Cossack Host was created for patrolling the Ussuri). It also staffed the Amur-Ussuri flotilla (river squadron), created in 1897. The Amur Cossacks possessed 5,8 million desyatinas of land (64,000 km^{2}). The Cossack population (120 settlements) numbered 49,200 people. In times of peace, the Amur Cossack Host supplied 1 mounted regiment (4 sotnyas) and 1 platoon of local guards. In times of war this contribution expanded to two mounted regiments, 1 platoon of guards, 5 special and 1 reserve sotnyas and 1 infantry battalion. These made up a total of 3,600 men.

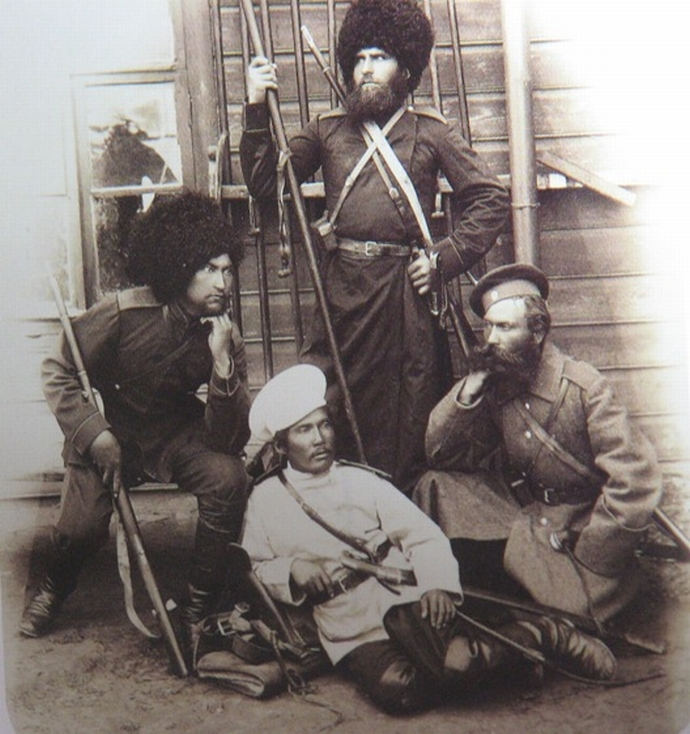
Four Amur Cossacks, c. 1900.

The Amur Cossack Host took part in the suppression of the Boxer Rebellion in China, the Russo-Japanese War of 1904-05 and World War I. During the Russian Civil War a significant number of the Amur Cossacks fought on the side of the Soviets. There were also some small units that fought on the side of the White Movement, more specifically in helping to regain control of the Amur region.

== Distinctions ==
The distinguishing colour of the Amur Cossack Host was yellow; worn on the cap bands and broad trouser stripes of a green uniform of the loose-fitting cut common to the Steppe Cossacks. Epaulettes were green. High fleece hats were worn on occasion with yellow cloth tops. White blouses and cap covers were worn in summer (see photograph opposite). In 1911 their parade uniform comprised a dark green chessman (frock coat) with yellow piping on cuffs and collar, the fleece hat and blue-grey breeches with yellow stripes. The field service dress worn during World War I consisted of a khaki-grey tunic or blouse, worn with the grey-blue breeches noted above.

In common with other Cossacks, no spurs were worn by the Amur Host.

== See also ==
- Albazin Cossacks
- Amur-Ussuri Cossacks
- Nikolay Muravyov-Amursky
