= Ussuri Cossacks =

Cossack host in the Russian Far East

Ussuri Cossack Host (Russian: Уссури́йское каза́чье во́йско, romanized: Ussuríyskoye kazáchye vóysko) was a Cossack Host in Imperial Russia, located in Primorye south of Khabarovsk along the Ussuri River, the Sungari River, and around the Khanka Lake.

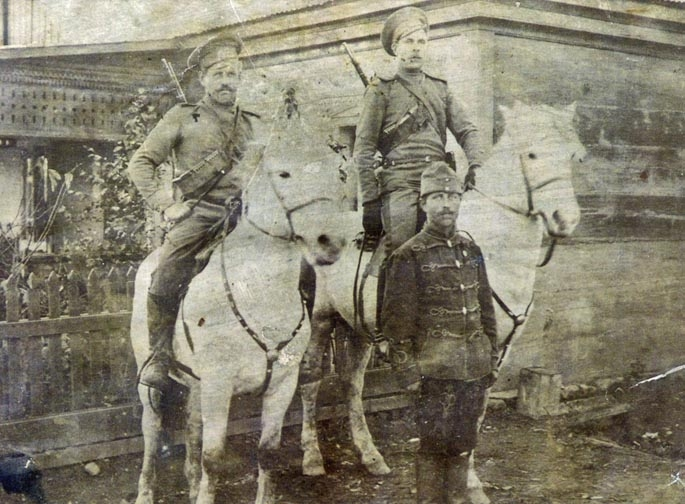
Ussuri Cossacks with a captive Austro-Hungarian soldier c1916.

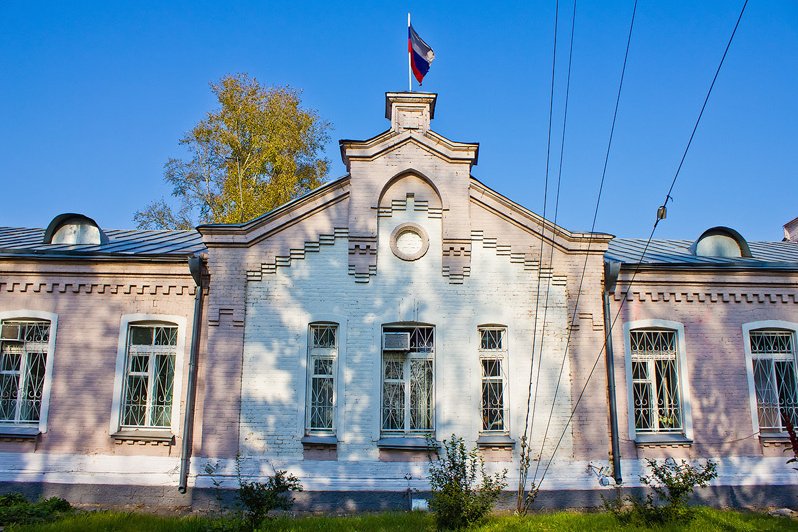
Casern (barracks) of the First Ussuri Cossack Sotnia, Khabarovsk

== History ==
The Ussuri Cossack Host was created in 1889 on the basis of an unmounted half-battalion of the Amur Cossack Host and later reinforced with settlers from the Don Cossack Host, Kuban Cossack Host, and other Cossack hosts. The Ussuri Cossack Host headquarters was first located in Vladivostok and then in Iman (now Dalnerechensk). Its nakazny ataman (who was also the military governor of the region) subordinated to the Governor General of the Amur region, who, in turn, was the nakazny ataman of the Amur and the Ussuri Cossack Hosts.

== Organisation and role ==
The Ussuri Cossacks possessed 6740 km² of land. In 1916, they numbered 39,900 people in six stanitsas, which comprised 76 settlements. In times of peace, the Ussuri Cossacks supplied one cavalry battalion (300 men) and one platoon. The Ussuri Cossack Host was used for border patrol, postal and police service. It participated in the Russo-Japanese War. During World War I, the Ussuri Cossacks supplied one cavalry regiment (600 men), one cavalry battalion, one platoon of guards, and six special sotnyas (a total of 2,514 men). Most of the Ussuri Cossack Host took the side of the White movement during the Russian Civil War. The majority of Cossacks joined Ataman Ivan Kalmykov’s Cossack detachment, whilst the other’s joined Ataman Semyonov’s OMO (Special Manchurian Detachment).

== Modern ==
The Ussuri Cossack Host was disbanded in 1922. It was re-established in 1990, although not as an administrative unit of any sort.

== Distinctions ==
The distinguishing colour of the Ussuri Cossack Host was yellow. This was the color of the cap bands, epaulettes and wide trouser stripes of a green uniform of the loose-fitting cut common to all the Steppe Cossack Hosts. Individual regiments were distinguished by numbers on the epaulettes. Lambs-wool hats (papakha) were worn on occasion with yellow cloth tops. From 1907 on, light khaki blouses (Gymnastyorka|gimnasterka) summer blouses were adopted to replace the white shirt-tunics previously worn. The blue/grey breeches with yellow stripes continued to be worn through World War I.
