= Political Centre (Russia) =

Russian political group during the Russian Civil War

Political Centre (Russian: Политцентр) was an independent political group in Irkutsk during the Russian Civil War (1917–1923). Being established in November 1919, its leaning was leftist: SR and Menshevik. The target was to remove Aleksandr Kolchak from power. That is historically why the Political Centre members joined local Bolsheviks and on 21 December 1919 began the uprising. The Political Centre directed the National Revolutionary Army (Russian: Народно-революционная армия Дальневосточной Республики). The Political Centre ended on 21 January 1920 when it transferred power to the Bolsheviks.

== See also ==
- Far Eastern Republic
