= Zemstvo of Maritime Territory =

Russian territory in 1920 during the civil war

Provisional Government of the Far East — Regional government of Primorye Zemstvo Приморская областная земская управа (Russian)
- 1920
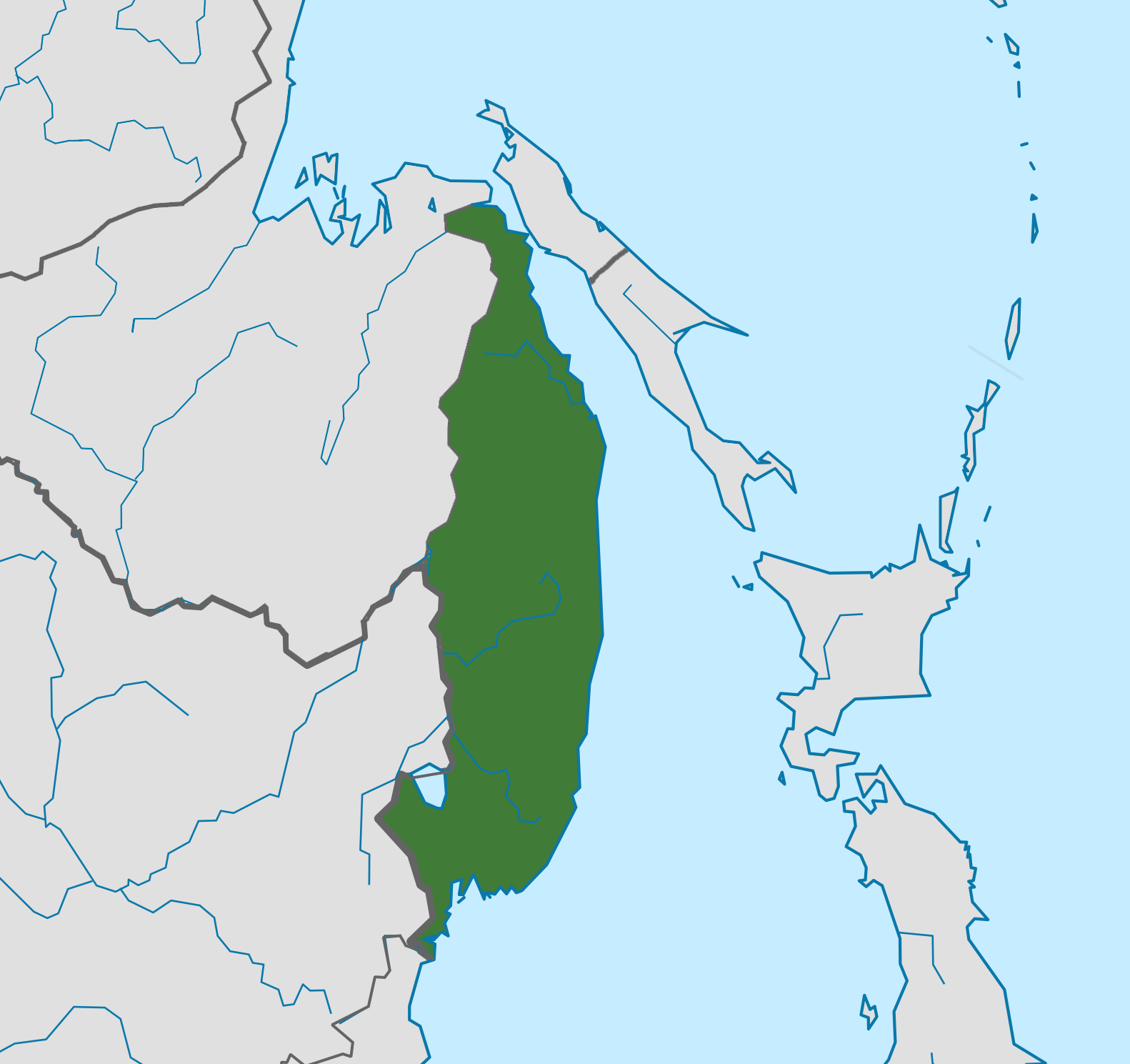
- Capital: Vladivostok
- Common languages: Russian
- Government: Provisional government
  - 1920: A.S. Medvedev
- Historical era: Russian Civil War
  - Established: 31 January 1920
  - Disestablished: 28 October 1920
Preceded by	Succeeded by
Russian State	Far Eastern Republic; Provisional Priamurye Government
- Today part of: Russia

Regional government of Primorye Zemstvo (Russian: Приморская областная земская управа) was a government that existed in the eastern part of Russia during the Russian Civil War between 31 January 1920 and 28 October 1920.

== An idea of buffer state ==
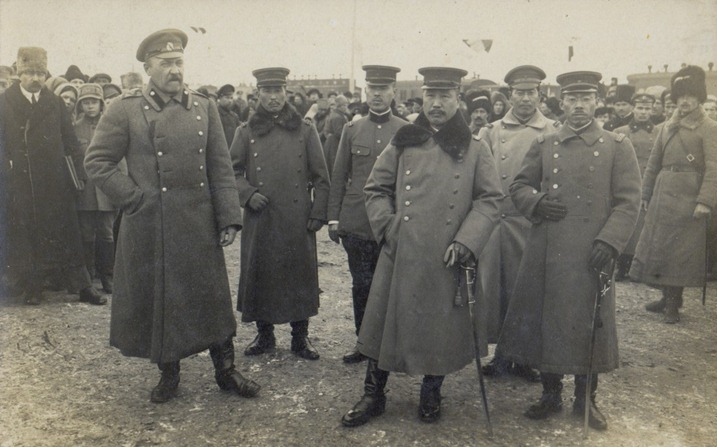
Lieutenant-General Rozanov with Japanese officers

In 1919, the White forces in Western Siberia were defeated by the Reds. Now the main threat for the young Soviet State was in Europe (Poland). The Russian Far East was occupied by the forces of different foreign countries (mainly Japan). The Central Committee of Russian Communist Party (bolsheviks) (RCP(b)) issued an order "to find a way of solving the complicated question of Eastern Siberia, trying to avoid a military conflict with Japan". At the end of December the SR-led Political Center had overthrown Aleksandr Kolchak in Irkutsk. During negotiations with the Revolution Military Council of the Red 5th Army in January 1920, the Political Center offered to organize a buffer republic in the Far East region with Irkutsk as its capital. Alexander Krasnoshchyokov, representative of the Irkutsk Revolution Committee, offered a similar idea. The Soviet government rejected the attempt of the Political Center to lead the creation of such a buffer state, but the idea itself was approved.

At that time, Vladivostok, the capital of Maritime Territory, was ruled by general Sergey Rozanov, who was subordinated to Admiral Kolchak. At the beginning of January 1920, an underground bolshevik's conference in Vladivostok decided to organize an uprising against Rozanov with the slogan "All power to Soviets!" In the middle of January a strong group of cooperative merchants and Zemstvo members organized itself in Vladivostok to oppose the Rozanov's dictatorship. The Bolsheviks in Vladivostok realized that establishing a Soviet regime in the Maritime Territory could slow the evacuation of foreign troops and Japanese troops could fight against the rebels, and decided to transfer the power to the Zemstvo Board after overthrowing the Rozanov dictatorship. On 26 January, revolutionary military forces created a United Revolution Operation Staff, led by Bolsheviks. It was decided to start the uprising on January, 31.

== Vladivostok Uprising ==
At the same time, the White authorities had learned about the revolutionary mood in the Jager Battalion and had decided to disarm it, but the soldiers arrested the officers and created a Battalion Committee. General Rozanov then engaged Gardes de la Marine and Junkers to suppress the mutiny. On 26 January 1920, after a fierce battle, the White Guards managed to surround the Jager Battalion, disarm it and send it to Russky Island, but this could not prevent the following events. In the night of 31 January, the Vladivostok Uprising began, and by the middle of the day, the whole city was captured by the rebels. Foreign troops had to keep neutrality, but helped Rozanov to flee and escape to Japan.

The Provisional Government of Zemstvo of Maritime Territory set as goals:

- To free the political prisoners
- To destroy the remains of Kolchak Dictatorship
- To reestablish social and political freedoms
- To organize a public control over the trade and industry
- To organize the food supplying and trade
- To remove foreign troops

The Bolsheviks organized a party conference at the beginning of February and decided to support the Provisional Government of Zemstvo of Maritime Territory, on the condition of keeping a significant Bolshevik influence in it (especially in the military and organizing sections).

== Building of a buffer state ==
For the organization of the buffer state, the Central Committee of RCP(b) created on 3 March, the Dal'biuro (Russian: Дальбюро, an abbreviation of "Дальневосточное бюро" - "Bureau for Far East"). I.G.Kushnarev, S.G.Lazo and P.M.Nikiforov became the Vladivostok members of the Dal'biuro. But the members of the Dal'biuro had different opinions about the creation of the buffer state: for example, in Vladivostok, Kushnarev supported an idea of buffer state, but Lazo was against it. By the middle of March 1920, a representative of the Siberian Revolutionary Committee - V.D.Vilenskij - arrived at Vladivostok with party's directives about the creation of the buffer state. Between 16 and 19 March, during the Territorial Party Conference in Nikolsk-Ussuriysky, Lazo contradicted Vilenskij. Lazo said: "We don't have to organize the democratic buffer here. If the Center wish us to organize a buffer — it will be a soviet buffer". The Conference members supported Lazo; thus, Center representatives had to compromise between the will of the people and strategic necessity.

To stop the spontaneous sovietizing of the Maritime Territory, the Siberian Revolution Committee sent a message (transferred by Kushnarev, who returned from Moscow): "There is a process of organizing a government in Verkhneudinsk; Alexander Krasnoshchyokov is our representative there. All Far Eastern governments should coordinate their movements and organize themselves similar to Transbaikal government". In this situation the Dal'biuro decided on 29 March, to stop the sovietizing of the Maritime Territory and to offer the Regional Zemstvo Administration to expand its authority by a special law over the whole Russian Far East. On 31 March, the Zemstvo issued such a declaration and organized an election for a People's Assembly on the basis of universal, equal and direct suffrage by secret ballot. This people's Assembly of Primorye elected the Council of Ministers headed by a A.S. Medvedev of the PSR. The Government of the Zemsko Administration was also preserved.

== Far Eastern Republic and Zemstvo of Maritime Territory ==
On 6 April 1920 an Assembly of workers of the Western Transbaikal Region proclaimed in Verkhneudinsk the creation of the Far Eastern Republic. The "Declaration of creation of an independent Far Eastern Republic" set as purpose uniting the whole Russian Far East. Therefore there became two pretenders for the position of its capital: Vladivostok and Verkhneudinsk. The Amur Oblast, with its pro-Soviet government, recognized Verkhneudinsk, but the Russia Eastern Outskirts wanted to negotiate with Vladivostok. Grigory Semyonov, head of Russia Eastern Outskirts, and N. P. Pumpianskiy, representative of Maritime Territory government - met at Manzhouli railway station, but couldn't agree about the unification.

As directions of the Siberian Revolution Committee were not too strict, Bolsheviks of Vladivostok used this situation to support the idea of making Vladivostok the capital of the Far Eastern Republic. This situation was favorable for Semyonov, because the Maritime Territory Popular Council negotiated with Semyonov's government as equals.

On 13 August 1920, the Political Bureau of Central Committee of RCP(b) approved "The Short Theses about the Far Eastern Republic". After reading it, representatives of Vladivostok in Verkhneudinsk signed a preliminary agreement with the government of the Far Eastern Republic, recognizing Verkhneudinsk as its capital.

On 24 August 1920, at the Khadabulak railway station, Grigory Semyonov and representatives of the Maritime Territory Popular Council signed an agreement about the unification of the Maritime Territory and the Transbaikal Territory under the leadership of the Maritime Territory government. Representatives of the Transbaikal Territory should have one third of the places in the united Popular Assembly of the Far East. Semyonov agreed to organize an election in the Transbaikal Territory according to the election law of the Maritime Territory. But the Maritime Territory Popular Council rejected to ratify this agreement.

In October 1920, Chita (capital of Russia's Eastern Outskirts) was captured by the Reds. At the Chita Conference (28 October – 11 November) three local governments (the Transbaikal Government, Amur Government, and Maritime Government, which also ruled the Kamchatka and Chukotka Peninsulas) joined in the united Far Eastern Republic.

Only formally part of the Far Eastern Republic, and with Japanese troops still present, the Zemstvo of Maritime Territory kept a certain autonomy. A new Provisional Priamurye Government would be created between 27 May 1921 and 25 October 1922 in the Maritime Territory after a coup by White forces supported by the Japanese Army.
