= Khabarovsk Campaign =

Campaign during the Russian Civil War (1921–1922)

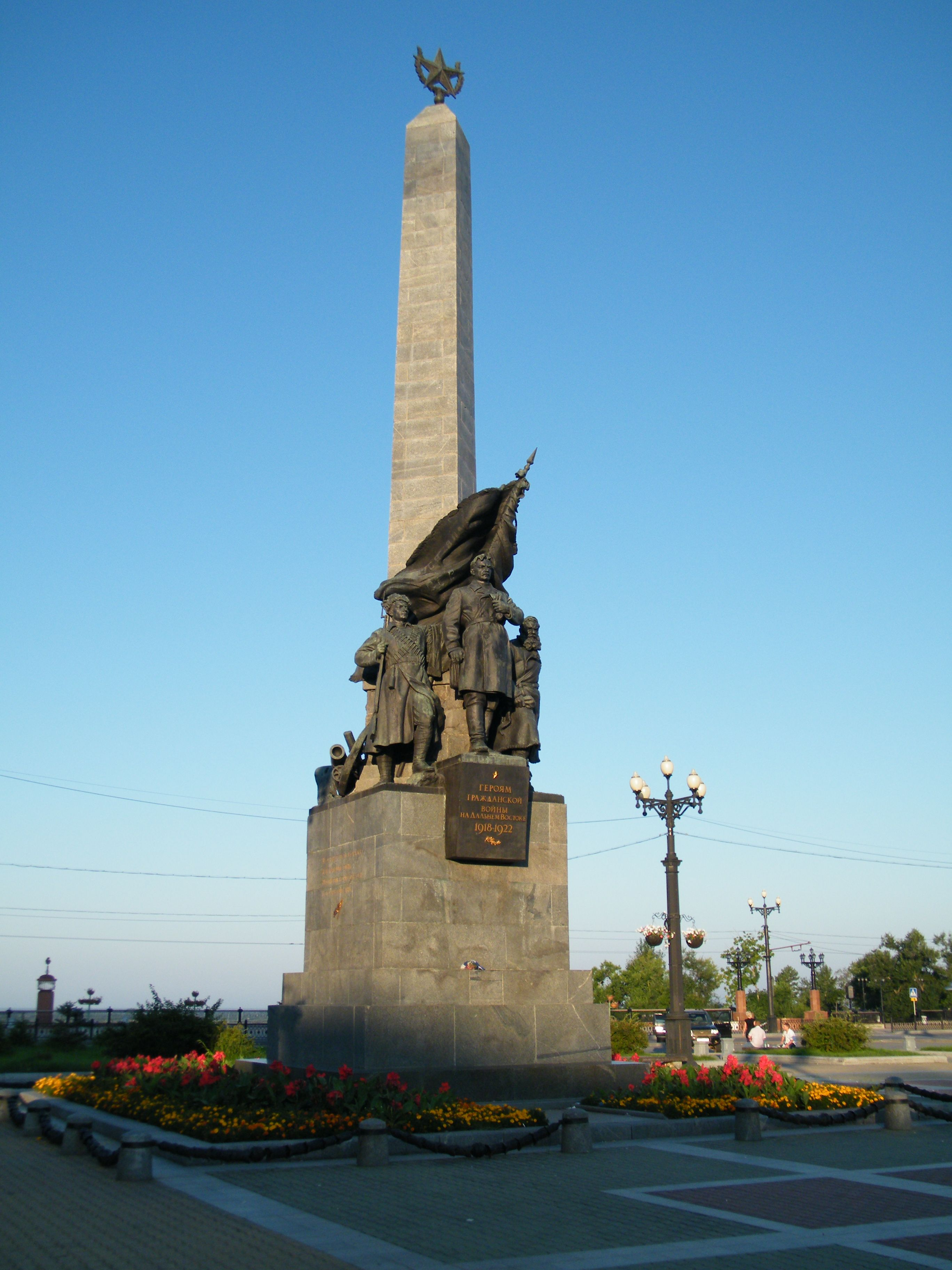
- Monument to the heroes of the Civil War in the Far East on Komsomol Square in Khabarovsk.
Date	November 1921 - March 1922
Location	Primorskaya Oblast; Amur Oblast
Result	White troops retreat to neutral zone

Belligerents
Far Eastern Republic	(Russia) Provisional Priamurye Government

Commanders and leaders
(Far Eastern Republic) Vasily Blyukher	(Russia) Viktorine Mikhaïlovtich Moltchanov

Strength
(Far Eastern Republic) More than 8,000 soldiers from the NRA DVR	(Russia) Over 6,000 soldiers of the Zemskaya Rat

Casualties and losses
(Far Eastern Republic) Unknown	(Russia) More than 1,000 killed and wounded

The Khabarovsk Campaign (Russian: Хабаровский поход, Khabarovski pokhod) refers to the advance of the Far Eastern White Armies toward Khabarovsk under the command of Viktorin Molchanov during the Russian Civil War, which was conducted between November 1921 and March 1922. The outcome marked a setback for the Provisional Government of Priamur, which was unable to regain control of Khabarovsk from the Far Eastern Republic.

== Background ==
The campaign took place during the Russian Civil War in Outer Manchuria, where the Provisional Government of Priamur (White Armies) opposed the Far Eastern Republic, a Bolshevik-aligned buffer state between Soviet Russia and Japan, which occupied Primorye as part of the Siberian Intervention. At the outset of the White offensive, conditions within the People's Revolutionary Army of the Far Eastern Republic (NRA FER or NRA) were unfavorable: military supplies were largely depleted, the armed forces had been reduced in number, some units had been demobilized, and recruits had not yet been enlisted.

The forward line consisted of the 5th and 6th Rifle Regiments—operating at battalion strength—along with the Kerbinski Detachment, the GPO Detachment, a sapper company, and a mine-clearing platoon, totaling approximately 1,200 infantry. The 4th Cavalry Regiment, comprising two squadrons with 280 cavalry and two artillery pieces, was also positioned on the front. Additional units were stationed in Khabarovsk and Blagoveshchensk and were responsible for security along the Amur River. Ongoing Russian Civil War operations had partially destroyed railway infrastructure, including sections of the Trans-Siberian Railway, and fuel shortages hindered logistical support and troop movements.

== White army offensive ==
=== Repression of the Red Guards ===
Before initiating their offensive into the territory of the Far Eastern Republic, the White forces sought to secure their rear by eliminating Red Guard detachments. In early November 1921, they launched an operation against key centers of the partisan movement in Primorye Oblast, particularly in the Suchan, Anuchino, and Yakovlevka regions.

- The detachment of General N. P. Sakharov (two infantry regiments, a cavalry division, and a light artillery battery) advanced toward Suchan, Maikhe, and Tsemukhe, left small garrisons at the Suchan coal mines, at Shkotovo, and at the Ugolnaya station, then followed the railway line toward Spassk, where it joined the main forces of General V. M. Molchanov.
- The group of Colonel von Wach (an infantry regiment and a cavalry squadron) was tasked with clearing the Khanka region of partisans, defeating the partisan detachment of E. Lebedev, and then reaching Spassk to join the main forces.
- The group of General Smolin was ordered to defeat partisan forces in the Anuchino–Yakovlevka area and to move toward Iman.

During the operation near the village of Nikolayevka, General Sakharov's detachment engaged and defeated a partisan unit commanded by Deputy Volsky, capturing its convoy and supplies. At Anuchino, the partisan forces withdrew, leaving behind their convoy and a printing press, which were seized by White troops on 23 November. In Yakovlevka, a partisan battalion under the command of Palitsyn surrendered without resistance. These actions resulted in losses for the partisan forces, which were dispersed and compelled to retreat into the taiga, while the White troops captured weapons and prisoners.

At the same time, instances of strong partisan resistance to White forces occurred. On 13 November 1921, a partisan detachment led by P. Nazarenko and military commissar Mitrofanov engaged in a prolonged battle in the Saint-Olga area before withdrawing after losing 22 fighters. On 22 November 1921, the 3rd partisan battalion under the command of I. Sidorov and Commissar S. Khristinine defeated the White garrison at Dushkino.

=== Course of the operation ===
On 30 November 1921, White forces under General Molchanov launched an offensive in which they defeated Far Eastern partisan detachments and forced the troops of the NRA of the Far Eastern Republic beyond the Amur River. They then advanced along the Trans-Siberian Railway. In December, a detachment under Colonel Ilkov was sent along the Chinese bank of the Amur to operate in the NRA rear, to occupy the village of Mikhailo-Semyonovskaya.

On 4 December 1921, the Whites seized the positions at Iman, and on 12 December those at Bikin. On 15 December 1921, a White cavalry group made a detour through Chinese territory and attacked Dormidontovka station, and on 17 December, made a detour around the Khetskhir Ridge and struck Nevelskaya.

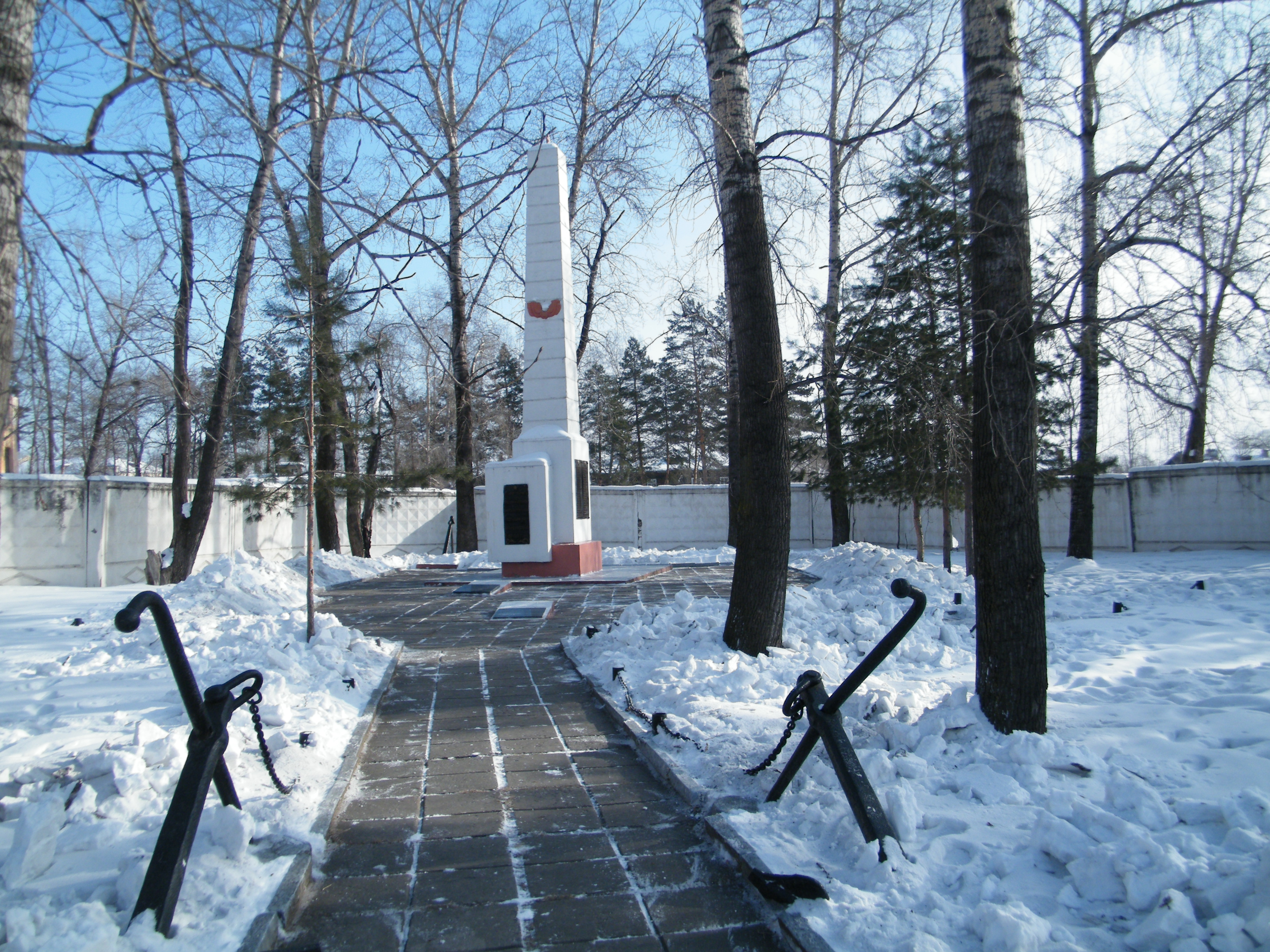
Khabarovsk, mass grave of sailors from the Amur River.

NRA units first counterattacked near the village of Budakovo, where a Red partisan detachment under G. F. Koval and a Chinese partisan detachment under Sin Di-u established snow trenches and rifle positions on Peremiatovskaia Hill. They blocked the winter road along the Ussuri River and held their positions for 24 hours, repelling four attacks by General Sakharov's cavalry brigade until General Chiriaev's brigade reached their rear. On 19 December 1921, during the battle near Kazakevitchevo, the Communist detachment named after Karl Liebknecht (about 200 men) repelled several attacks before withdrawing due to depleted ammunition; it suffered 39 killed, and 28 captured members were subsequently executed by White forces. In the battle near the village of Novotroitskoe, the Amur Special Regiment and the 4th Cavalry Division resisted the White advance for four hours.

On 22 December 1921, White forces captured Khabarovsk and, continuing their offensive, subsequently took Pokrovka, Dejnevka, and Volochaevka, covering more than 600 miles over three months. During the advance, White units were reinforced by local partisans and sympathizers, as well as conscripted residents, and captured weapons were incorporated into service. The troops experienced shortages of winter clothing, including felt boots, sheepskin coats, and hats, which the White command did not adequately provide; for instance, sheepskin coats arrived late, while boots were not ordered. In an effort to gain support from the local population, the White military command attempted to compensate residents for goods and items taken and sought to limit unauthorized requisitions.

On 28 December 1921, White forces of approximately 1,000 infantry and 500 cavalry, supported by artillery, attempted to capture Ine station (now Smidovich). The main attack came from the south, while a secondary advance proceeded along the railway from the east, and another detachment engaged NRA positions from the north. The absence of General V. M. Molchanov, who remained in Khabarovsk, contributed to poor coordination among the White units. NRA forces, commanded by F. M. Petrov-Teterine and supported by an armored train, repelled the attack. White losses were around 300, with 3 officers and 19 soldiers captured. The battle at Ine station marked the first victory of the NRA, and participants were formally recognized: F. M. Petrov-Teterine received the Order of the Red Banner, and the crew of Armored Train No. 8 received a silver cup and a banner inscribed “For keeping the Ine station in our hands.”

Between 28 December 1921 and 5 February 1922, five further military engagements occurred between NRA units and White forces, four of which resulted in NRA victories.

During this period, partisan activity increased behind White lines, with partisans attacking White units, conducting railway sabotage, and disrupting repair, economic, and mobilization efforts.

- On 6 January 1922, in the vicinity of the railway at Muraviov-Amurski station, the partisans of the Iman Valley blew up a White artillery depot.
- On 12 January 1922, a detachment of Red partisans under the command of D. I. Boiko-Pavlov attacked Khabarovsk.

By early February 1922, the White Army had lost its strategic initiative and was forced to shift to the defensive.

== NRA counteroffensive ==
At the beginning of February 1922, the People's Revolutionary Army of the Far Eastern Republic (NRA FER) reorganized its combat units, secured supplies, and received support from Soviet Russia, creating the conditions for a decisive offensive. NRA forces began concentrating in the area of Ine station.

On 5 February 1922, the 2nd Rifle Regiment of the 1st Chita Rifle Brigade captured Olgokhta station. From 9 to 12 February, heavy fighting near Volochaevka station resulted in the breaking of the White front, with NRA forces entering Volochaevka on 12 February at 11:32. On 14 February, NRA units occupied Khabarovsk, which White forces had abandoned. Subsequently, NRA forces took control of the railway line at Viazemskin station on 18 February and Rozengartovka station on 21 February. On 27 February, NRA units—including the 2nd Chita Regiment, the Amur Special Regiment, the Troitskosavsk Cavalry Regiment, and the 4th Cavalry Regiment—defeated White forces under Generals Smoline and Iastrebtsev and secured positions at Bikin. NRA units occupied Vassilievka on 28 February and Bikin on 1 March.

On 18 March 1922, NRA units occupied Iman, followed by Ussuri station on 21 March, located beyond the “neutral zone” under Japanese control. By that time, retreating White forces had already entered the neutral zone.

Partisan units operating behind White lines provided significant support to the NRA of the Far Eastern Republic. The 6th partisan detachment, under M. Anissimov, disrupted movement along the railway at Sutchán, limiting the White command's ability to reinforce front-line units. On 4 March 1922, partisan detachments engaged a group under General P. A. Blokhin in the village of Anutchino, initially numbering 600 men with six machine guns, later reinforced by retreating units. On 26 March, partisans attacked and captured Anutchino, resulting in 70 White casualties and 130 wounded, the abandonment of their convoy, and the retreat of remaining forces.

== See also ==
- Bibliography of the Russian Revolution and Civil War
- Outline of the Russian Revolution and Civil War
- Index of articles related to the Russian Revolution and Civil War
- The "Russian" Civil Wars, 1916–1926: Ten Years That Shook the World
- Russia in Flames: War, Revolution, Civil War, 1914–1921
- Russia in Revolution: An Empire in Crisis, 1890 to 1928
- Russia: Revolution and Civil War, 1917—1921
- The Russian Revolution: A New History
- Far Eastern Republic
- Khabarovsk
- Russian Civil War

== Bibliography ==
- Filimonov, Boris (1933). Белоповстанцы. Хабаровский поход, книга 1 [The White Rebels. The Khabarovsk Campaign, Book 1] (PDF) (in Russian).
- Ilioukhov, N; Titov, M (1928). Партизанское движение в Приморь: 1918—1920 гг [The partisan movement in Primorye: 1918–1920] (in Russian). Léningrad: Priboï.
- "Глава 4. Хабаровский поход. Наступление "Белоповстанцев". Взятие Хабаровска" [Chapter 4. The Khabarovsk Campaign. The Advance of the “White Rebels.” The Capture of Khabarovsk.] (in Russian).
- Okounev, Dmitri (2021). "Белогвардейский реванш: как каппелевцы захватили власть в Приморье" [The White Guard's revenge: how Kappel's forces seized power in Primorye]. Gazeta.ru (in Russian).
- Zemlianski, Vadim Leonidovitch (2022). "ХАБАРОВСКИЙ ПОХОД 1921–1922 ГОДОВ: ПОЛИТИЧЕСКОЕ ПОЛОЖЕНИЕ НА ТЕРРИТОРИИ, ЗАНЯТОЙ БЕЛОПОВСТАНЦАМИ" [THE KHABAROVSK CAMPAIGN OF 1921–1922: THE POLITICAL SITUATION IN THE TERRITORY OCCUPIED BY THE WHITE REBELS] (PDF). Культура И Наука Дальнего Востока (in Russian) (1): 65–69.
- Petrov, Fedor (1968). Героические годы борьбы и побед: Дальний Восток в огне гражданской войны [Heroic years of struggle and victory: The Far East in the flames of civil war] (in Russian). Изд-во "Наука".
- Malytchev, V.P (1961). "Октябрь на Амуре, 1917—1922 / Сб. документов" [October on the Amur, 1917–1922 / Collection of documents.]. Blagovechtchensk (in Russian).
