= Far Eastern Republic =

1920–1922 buffer state in the Russian Far East

Coordinates: 51°50′N 107°36′E

Far Eastern Republic Дальневосточная Республика (Russian)
- 1920–1922
- Flag Coat of arms
- Anthem: Интернационал "The Internationale" (1920–1922)
- Far Eastern Republic: – Maximum extent in 1920 (green and dark green); – Extent from 1920 to 1922 (dark green)
- Status: Puppet/buffer state of the RSFSR
- Capital: Verkhneudinsk (until Oct 1920); Chita (from Oct 1920)
- Common languages: Russian
- Government: Socialist republic
- President
  - 1920–1921: A. Krasnoshchyokov
  - 1921–1922: Nikolay Matveyev
- Prime Minister
  - 1920: A. Krasnoshchyokov
  - 1920–1921: Boris Shumyatsky
  - 1921: Pyotr Nikiforov
  - 1921–1922: Nikolay Matveyev
  - 1922: Pyotr Kobozev
- History
  - Established: 6 April 1920
  - Disestablished: 15 November 1922
Preceded by
Eastern Okraina
Zemstvo of Maritime Territory
State of Buryat-Mongolia
Succeeded by
Provisional Priamurye Government
Russian Soviet Federative Socialist Republic
- Today part of: Russia

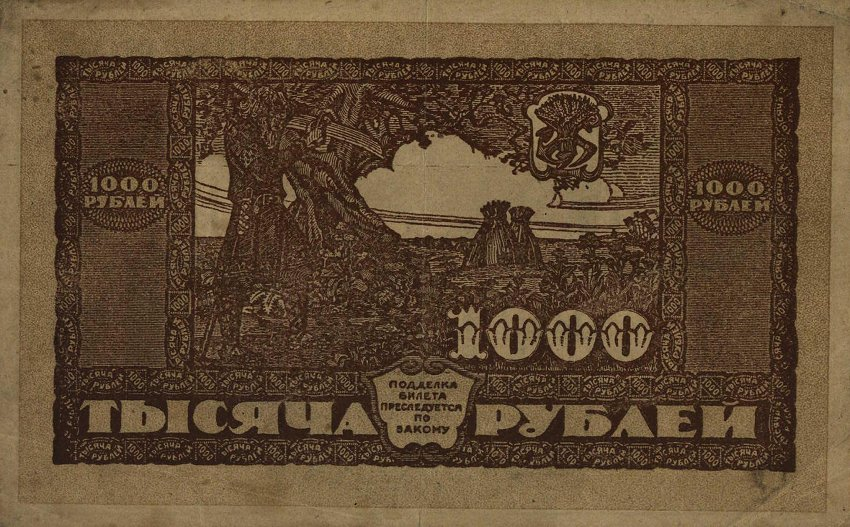
The Far Eastern Republic banknote of 1,000 rubles (1920)

The Far Eastern Republic (Russian: Дальневосточная Республика, romanized: Dal'nevostochnaya Respublika, IPA: [dəlʲnʲɪvɐˈstotɕnəjə rʲɪsˈpublʲɪkə]; ДВР, DVR), sometimes called the Chita Republic (Russian: Читинская Республика, romanized: Chitinskaya Respublika, IPA: [tɕɪˈtʲɪnskəjə rʲɪsˈpublʲɪkə]), was a nominally independent state that existed from April 1920 to November 1922 in the easternmost part of the Russian Far East and Transbaikal. Although nominally independent, it largely came under the control of the Russian Soviet Federative Socialist Republic (RSFSR), which envisaged it as a buffer state between the RSFSR and the territories occupied by Japan during the Russian Civil War of 1917–1922. The Far Eastern Republic came to an end in November 1922 when it voluntarily merged with the RSFSR, which became one of founding members of the Soviet Union the following month. Its first president was Alexander Krasnoshchyokov.

The Far Eastern Republic occupied the territory of modern Zabaykalsky Krai, Amur Oblast, the Jewish Autonomous Oblast, Khabarovsk Krai, and Primorsky Krai of Russia (the former Transbaikal and Amur oblasts and Primorsky krai). Its capital was established at Verkhneudinsk (now Ulan-Ude), but in October 1920 it moved to Chita.

The Red Army occupied Vladivostok on 25 October 1922. Three weeks later, on 15 November 1922, the Far Eastern Republic merged with the RSFSR.

== History ==
=== Establishment ===
The Far Eastern Republic was established in the later stages of the Russian Civil War. During the Civil War local authorities generally controlled the towns and cities of the Russian Far East, cooperating to a greater or lesser extent with the White Siberian government of Alexander Kolchak and with the succeeding invading forces of the Japanese Army. When the Japanese evacuated the Trans-Baikal and Amur oblasts in the spring of 1920, a political vacuum resulted.

A new central authority was established at Chita to govern the Far Eastern Republic remaining in the Japanese wake. The Far Eastern Republic was established comprising only the area around Verkhneudinsk, but during the summer of 1920, the Soviet government of the Amur territory agreed to join.

The Far Eastern Republic was formed two months after Kolchak's death with the tacit support of the government of Soviet Russia, which saw it as a temporary buffer state between the RSFSR and the territories occupied by Japan. Many members of the Russian Communist Party had disagreed with the decision to allow a new government in the region, believing that their approximately 4,000 members were capable of seizing power in their own right. However, Vladimir Lenin and other party leaders in Moscow felt that the approximately 70,000 Japanese and 12,000 American troops might regard such an action as a provocation, which might spur a further attack that the Soviet Republic could ill afford.

On 1 April 1920, the American Expeditionary Force, Siberia headed by General William S. Graves departed Siberia, leaving the Japanese the sole occupying power in the region with whom the Bolsheviks were forced to deal. This detail did not change the basic equation for the Bolshevik government in Moscow, however, which continued to see the establishment of a Far Eastern Republic as a sort of Treaty of Brest-Litovsk in the east, providing the regime with a necessary breathing space that would allow it to recover economically and militarily.

On 6 April 1920, a hastily convened Constituent Assembly gathered at Verkhneudinsk and proclaimed the establishment of the Far Eastern Republic. Promises were made that the republic's new constitution would guarantee free elections under the principles of universal, direct, and equal suffrage and that foreign investment in the country would be encouraged.

The Far Eastern Republic, controlled by moderate socialists, was only grudgingly recognized by the various cities of the region towards the end of 1920. Violence, atrocities, and reprisals continued to erupt periodically for the next 18 months. One such example occurred at the Korean enclave Shinhanchon, where Korean civilians were massacred by Japanese soldiers.

Japan agreed to recognize the new buffer state in a truce with the Red Army signed on 15 July 1920, effectively abandoning Ataman Grigory Semenov and his Russia Eastern Outskirts. By October Semenov had been expelled from his base of operations in Chita. With Semenov out of the picture, the capital of the Far Eastern Republic moved to that city.

On 11 November 1920 a provisional national assembly for the Far East met in Vladivostok. The gathering recognized the government at Chita and set 9 January 1921 as the date for new elections for the Constituent Assembly of the Far Eastern Republic. A new constitution closely resembling the United States Constitution was written and approved on 27 April 1921.

=== The 1921 coup ===
However, right-wing elements rejected the idea of a fledgling democratic republic in the Russian Far East. On 26 May 1921 a White coup took place in Vladivostok, backed by Japanese occupying forces. A cordon sanitaire of Japanese troops protected the insurgents, who established a new régime, the Provisional Government of the Priamur, in the Primorskaya Oblast. Shortly after the coup, Kolchak's designated successor, Ataman Semenov, arrived in Vladivostok and attempted to proclaim himself commander-in-chief—an effort which failed when his Japanese benefactors forsook him.

The new Provisional Government of the Priamur attempted—with little success—to rally the various anti-Bolshevik forces to its banner. Its leaders, two Vladivostok businessmen—the brothers Spiridon Merkulov and Nikolai Merkulov—found themselves left isolated when the Japanese Army announced on 24 June 1922 that it would remove all of its troops from Siberia by the end of October. A July 1922 Zemsky sobor deposed the Merkulov brothers and named a Russian general who had served with the Czechoslovak Legion, M.K. Dieterichs, as military dictator.

=== FER victory and demise, 1922 ===
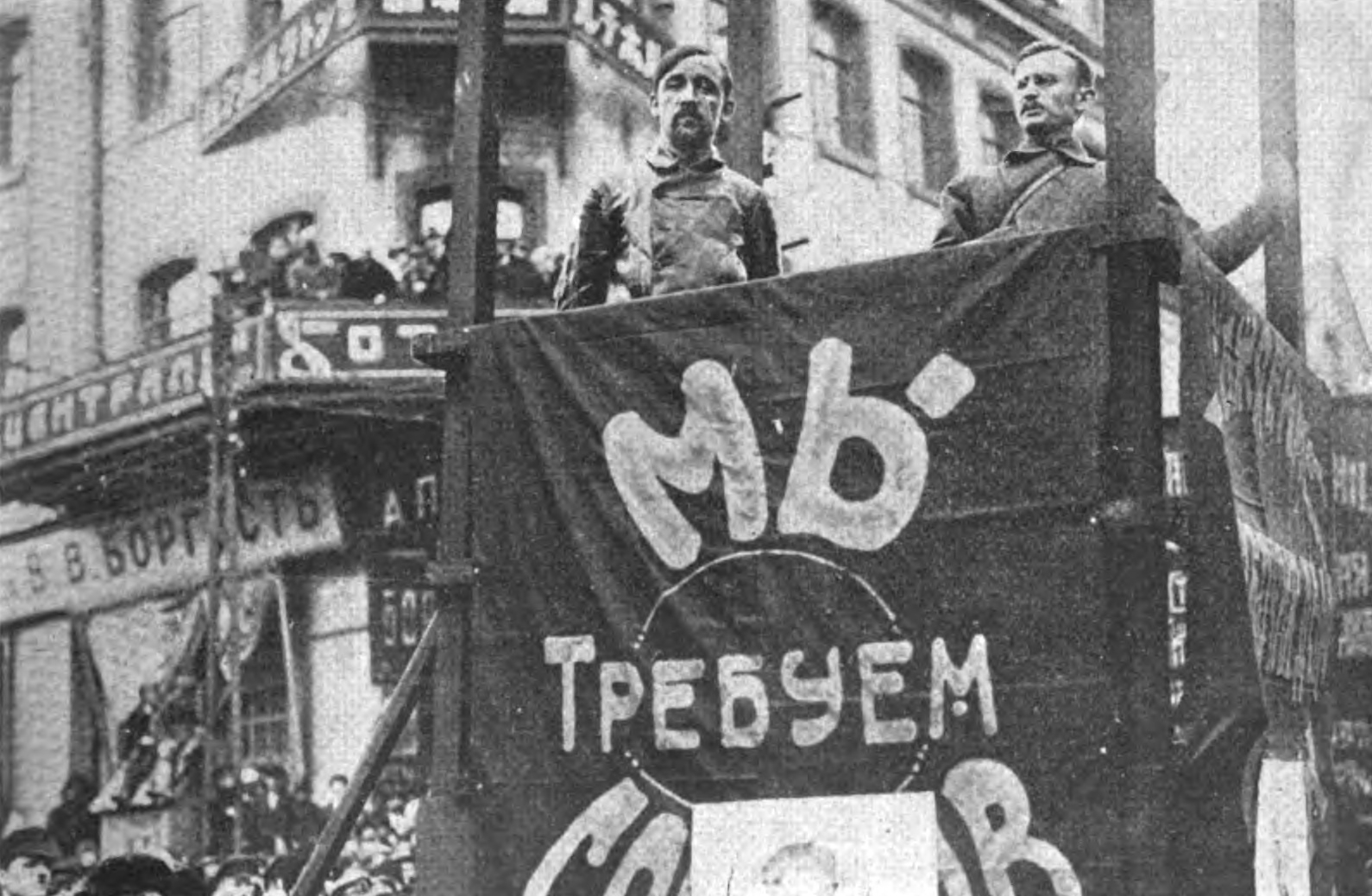
Ieronim Uborevich (right), minister of war of the FER and commander-in-chief of its People's Revolutionary Army, gives a speech in Vladivostok after the withdrawal of the Japanese, 1922

With the Japanese exiting the country throughout the summer of 1922, panic swept through the White Russian insurgents. As the Red Army, thinly disguised as the People's Revolutionary Army of the Far Eastern Republic, moved eastwards, thousands of Russians, including Dieterichs and his remaining troops, fled abroad to escape the new régime. The army of the Far Eastern Republic retook Vladivostok on 25 October 1922, effectively bringing the Russian Civil War to a close.

With the Civil War finally over, Soviet Russia absorbed the Far Eastern Republic on 15 November 1922. The government of the Far Eastern Republic dissolved itself and transferred all its authority and territory to the Bolshevik government in Moscow.

=== Aftermath ===
The northern half of Sakhalin island remained under Japanese occupation until 1925. The pretext for the occupation was the killing of Japanese civilians during the Nikolayevsk Incident, But Japan already had considerable interest in the territory due to it bordering Karafuto Prefecture, along with north Sakhalin's considerable petroleum reserves. They would withdraw following the signing of the Soviet–Japanese Basic Convention.

== Territory and resources ==
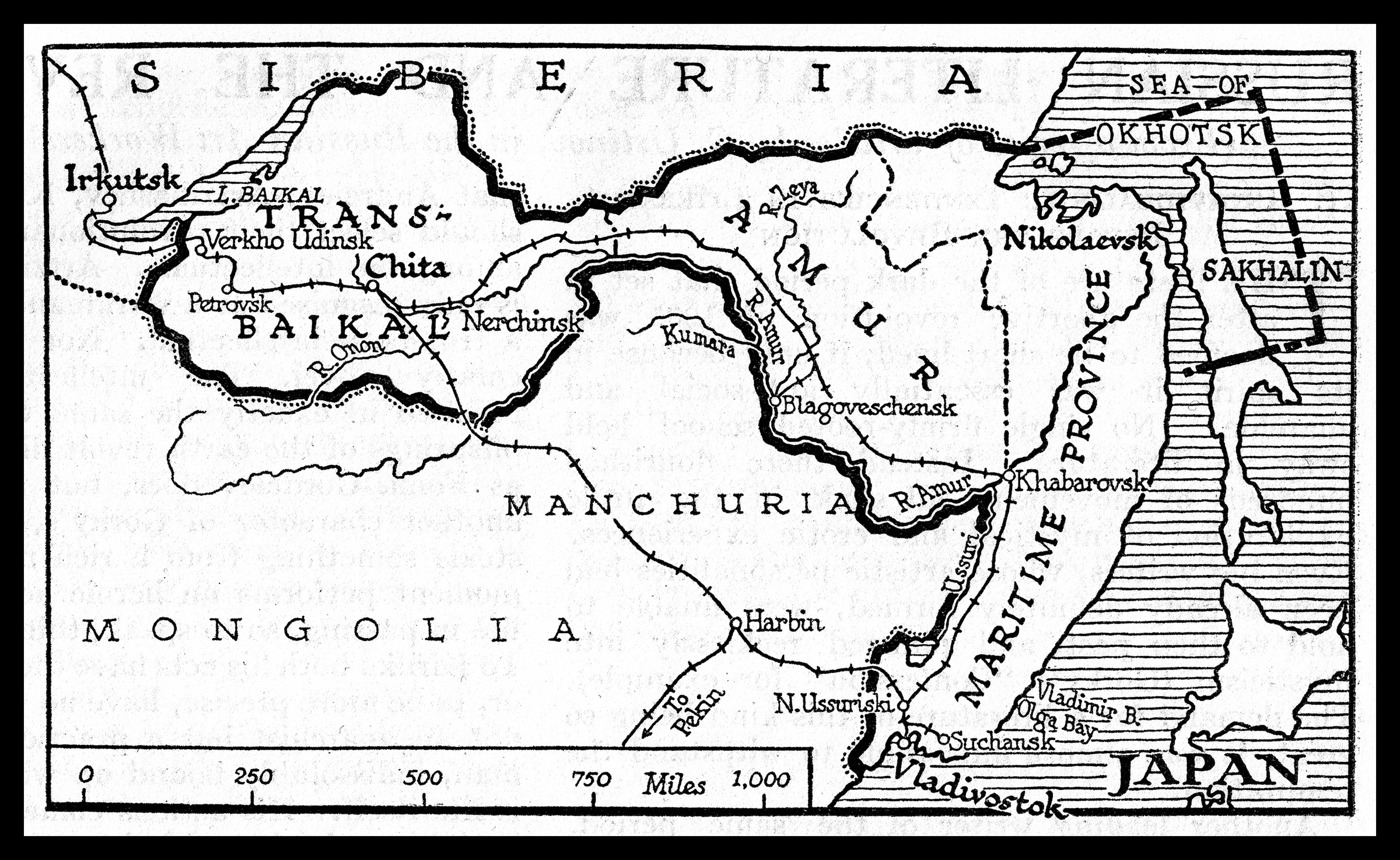
Territory of the Far Eastern Republic in 1922

The Far Eastern Republic consisted of four provinces of the former Russian Empire — Trans-Baikal, Amur, the Maritime Province, and the northern half of Sakhalin island. Primarily, it represented the boundaries of the regions of Transbaikal and Outer Manchuria. The frontiers of the short-lived nation followed the western coastline of Lake Baikal along the northern borders of Mongolia and Manchuria to the Sea of Japan and the Sea of Okhotsk.

The total area of the Far Eastern Republic was reckoned at approximately 730,000 square miles (1,900,000 km^{2}) and its population at about 3.5 million people. Of these an estimated 1.62 million were ethnic Russians and just over 1 million were of Asian extraction, with family lineages originating in China, Japan, Mongolia, and Korea.

The Far Eastern Republic was an area of substantial mineral wealth, including territory which produced about one-third of the entire Russian output of gold as well as that country's only source of domestically produced tin. Other mineral reserves of the Far Eastern Republic included zinc, iron, and coal.

The fishing industry of the former Maritime Province was substantial, with a total catch exceeding that of Iceland and featuring ample stocks of herring, salmon, and sturgeon. The Republic also boasted extensive forestry resources, including over 120 million acres (490,000 km^{2}) of harvestable pine, fir, cedar, poplar, and birch.

== People's Revolutionary Army ==
Оn 20 July 1922, the 104th Balagansk Rifle Brigade was reorganized into the 1st Transbaikal Rifle Division of the People's Revolutionary Army of the Far Eastern Republic. The division defended the border with Manchuria from its formation, and between 4 and 25 October took part in the Primorsky operation to defeat the Zemskaya Rat, the last remnants of the Whites in the Far East. During the operation, the 1st Transbaikal Rifle Division fought in the capture of Grodekovo, Nikolsk-Ussuriysky, and Vladivostok.

The 5th Army (fourth formation) was created by order of the All-Russian Central Executive Committee of the RSFSR of November 16, 1922 by renaming the People's Revolutionary Army of the Far Eastern Republic. The 1st Transbaikal Rifle Division came under its command. It was based at Vladivostok. In honor of its defeat of White troops on the shores of the Pacific and basing on the Pacific coast, the division was redesignated the 1st Pacific Rifle Division (Russian: 1-я Тихоокеанская стрелковая дивизия, romanized: 1-ya Tikhookeanskaya strelkovaya diviziya) on 22 November 1922.

== Government ==
=== Chairmen of the Government (heads of state) ===
- Alexander Krasnoshchyokov 6 April 1920 – December 1921
- Nikolay Matveyev December 1921 – 15 November 1922

=== Chairmen of the Council of Ministers (Prime Ministers) ===
- Alexander Krasnoshchyokov 6 April 1920 – November 1920
- Boris Shumyatsky November 1920 – April 1921
- Pyotr Nikiforov 8 May 1921 – December 1921
- Nikolay Matveyev December 1921 – 14 November 1922
- Pyotr Kobozev 14 November 1922 – 15 November 1922

=== List of Cabinet ===
==== Cabinet of Alexander Krasnoshchyokov ====
- Alexander Krasnoshchyokov – Chairman of the Government (Prime Minister)
- Nikolai Matveyev – Foreign Affairs
- Boris Shumyatsky – Internal Affairs
- Alexander Arosev – Military Affairs
- Vasily Yakovlev – Transport
- Ivan Smirnov – Finance

==== Cabinet of Boris Shumyatsky ====
- Boris Shumyatsky – Chairman of the Government
- Nikolai Matveyev – Foreign Affairs
- Alexander Arosev – Military Affairs
- Konstantin Mekhonoshin – War / Armed Forces
- Ivan Smirnov – Finance
- Vasily Yakovlev – Transport

==== Cabinet of Pyotr Nikiforov ====
- Pyotr Nikiforov – Chairman of the Government
- Nikolai Matveyev – Foreign Affairs
- Konstantin Mekhonoshin – Military / War Affairs
- Ivan Smirnov – Finance
- Vasily Yakovlev – Transport
- Boris Shumyatsky – Internal Affairs

== Prominent people born in the Far Eastern Republic ==
- Yul Brynner (11 July 1920 – 10 October 1985), actor

== See also ==
- Allied intervention in the Russian Civil War
- American Expeditionary Force, Siberia
- Postage stamps and postal history of the Far Eastern Republic
- Outer Manchuria
- Green Ukraine
- Siberian Intervention
- Transcaucasian Socialist Federative Soviet Republic
- Priamur electoral district (Russian Constituent Assembly election, 1917)
