= Pyotr Kobozev =

Soviet statesman and academic (1878–1941)

- Пётр Кобозев
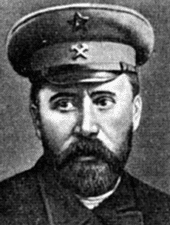

People's Commissar of Transport of the RSFSR
- In office 9 May 1918 – 13 June 1918
- Premier: Vladimir Lenin
- Preceded by: Aleksei Rogov
- Succeeded by: Vladimir Nevsky

Chairman of the Council of Ministers of the Far Eastern Republic
- In office 4 October 1922 – 14 November 1922
- Preceded by: Pyotr Nikiforov
- Succeeded by: Office annulled

Rector of Leningrad Polytechnical Institute
- In office 2 November 1928 – 1 September 1929
- Preceded by: Alexander Baykov
- Succeeded by: Alexander Shumsky

Rector of Moscow Land Survey Institute
- In office 1924 – November 1928

Personal details
- Born: Pyotr Alekseevich Kobozev; 13 August 1878 Pesochnya, Spassky Uyezd, Ryazan Governorate
- Died: 4 January 1941 (aged 62) Moscow, Soviet Union
- Resting place: Novodevichy Cemetery
- Citizenship: Russian, Soviet
- Party: Russian Social Democratic Labour Party, Bolsheviks
- Spouse: Alevtina Rakitina
- Education: Riga Polytechnical Institute
- Occupation: Revolutionary, politician
- Profession: Engineer
- Nickname(s): Engineer, Doubting Thomas

Pyotr Alekseevich Kobozev (Russian: Пётр Алексе́евич Ко́бозев; 13 August 1878 — 4 January 1941) was a prominent Russian revolutionary, Soviet statesman and professor. He had played a significant role in establishing and maintaining Soviet regime in the Ural region, Turkestan and the Far East.

== Biography ==
Pyotr Kobozev was born in 1878 in the village of Pesochnya, Spassky Uyezd (now Shilovsky District), Ryazan Governorate, in the family of Aleksey Fedotovich Kobozev, a Moscow railroad employee. Influenced by his mother, the daughter of a church acolyte, he went to a theological school and later to the Moscow seminary. In 1895 he left (other sources say he was expelled for participating in a student uprising) the seminary and entered the Moscow secondary school of Ivan Findler. In 1896 he began to take part in A.P. Alabin's Marxist circle, where he met his future wife, Alevtina Ivanovna Rakitina, a gimnasium student. They married in 1898.

In 1898 he entered the Russian Social Democratic Labour Party and started studies at the Moscow Higher Technical School. But in 1899 he was expelled from it due to being involved in the all-Russian student strike. In 1900, together with his wife and a new-born daughter, he was exiled to Riga, Latvia, where he lived and studied at the Riga Polytechnical Institute until 1904. In Riga, Pyotr Kobozev worked at the German-Dutch Van der Zypen und Charlier company manufacturing railroad wagons. He was part of the Riga RSDLP section and a member of the editorial board of the Voice of the Soldier Newspaper. Later on, he, together with his family, went to the petrolium mines in the Caucasus, but returned to Moscow in a short while, where he was arrested and exiled to Riga again. He was blacklisted for his revolutionary activity, which resulted in unemployment, and P. Kobozev had to earn through private tuturing.

In 1915 – 1916 P. Kobozev and his family were in exile in Orenburg, where he worked as a railroad engineer. In Orenburg P. Kobozev became the leader of the local section of RSDLP, and was under personal control of the governorate's gandarmerie head.

=== February Revolution ===
After the February Revolution, Pyotr Kobozev organized an agitation train, in which he covered the route from Orenburg to Tashkent agitating among railroad employees for support of the Bolsheviks. In April 1917, P. Kobozev was appointed the Commissar of the Tashkent railroad, which, however, faced opposition from the Provisional Government and he was commissioned back to Petrograd. In May 1917, P. Kobozev was elected to the Petrograd City Duma from the Bolsheviks, and was appointed the chief inspector over the educational institutions of the Ministry of Transport.

=== Dutov's Revolt ===
On the next day of the October Revolution (26 October), the Cossack Ataman Alexander Dutov claimed power in the Orenburg region. The Mensheviks and the Socialist Revolutionaries approved of it, but the Bolsheviks opposed. Eventually, the supporters of A. Dutov had taken over in the region. P. Kobozev was appointed the extraordinary commissar for fighting Dutov's counterrevolution. On 12 November 1917, P. Kobozev secretly came to Orenburg. He had a coordination meeting with the local Bosheviks and left the city for Buzuluk, from where they planned the offensive. However, only in January 1918, Kobozev's troops managed to get Orenburg back to the Soviet authorities. P. Kobozev drove one of the armored trains himself.

=== Turkestan and the Far East ===
After the Orenburg campaign, P. Kobozev was sent to Baku to nationalize the local oil industry, as well as transport Turkestan oil to Central Russia. V. Lenin entrusted P. Kobozev with 200 million rubles to support Bolsheviks in Orenburg, Baku and Tashkent. The task was successfully fulfilled and the oil was sent to Russia.

In May 1918 he was elected First President of the Central Executive Committee of Turkestan Soviet Federative Republic and a member of the Revolutionary Military Council of the Turkestan Front. Soon he was called out back to Moscow and appointed the Minister of Transport, where he was in office until 13 June 1918. In September 1918 – April 1919 he was a member of the all-Russian Revolutionary Military Council. In February 1919 he was appointed chairman of the Central Executive Committee of the Turkestan Autonomous Soviet Socialist Republic Being in Turkestan he actively organized building of schools and Turkestan People's University, where in 1919 he gave lectures on energetics.

On 4 October 1922, P. Kobozev was appointed the Prime Minister of the Far Eastern Republic, and remained in office until 14 November 1922. During his office the Far East became part of the Soviet Union. P. Kobozev signed the peace treaty between the Far Eastern Republic and Japan on behalf of the Soviet Union.

== Academic career ==
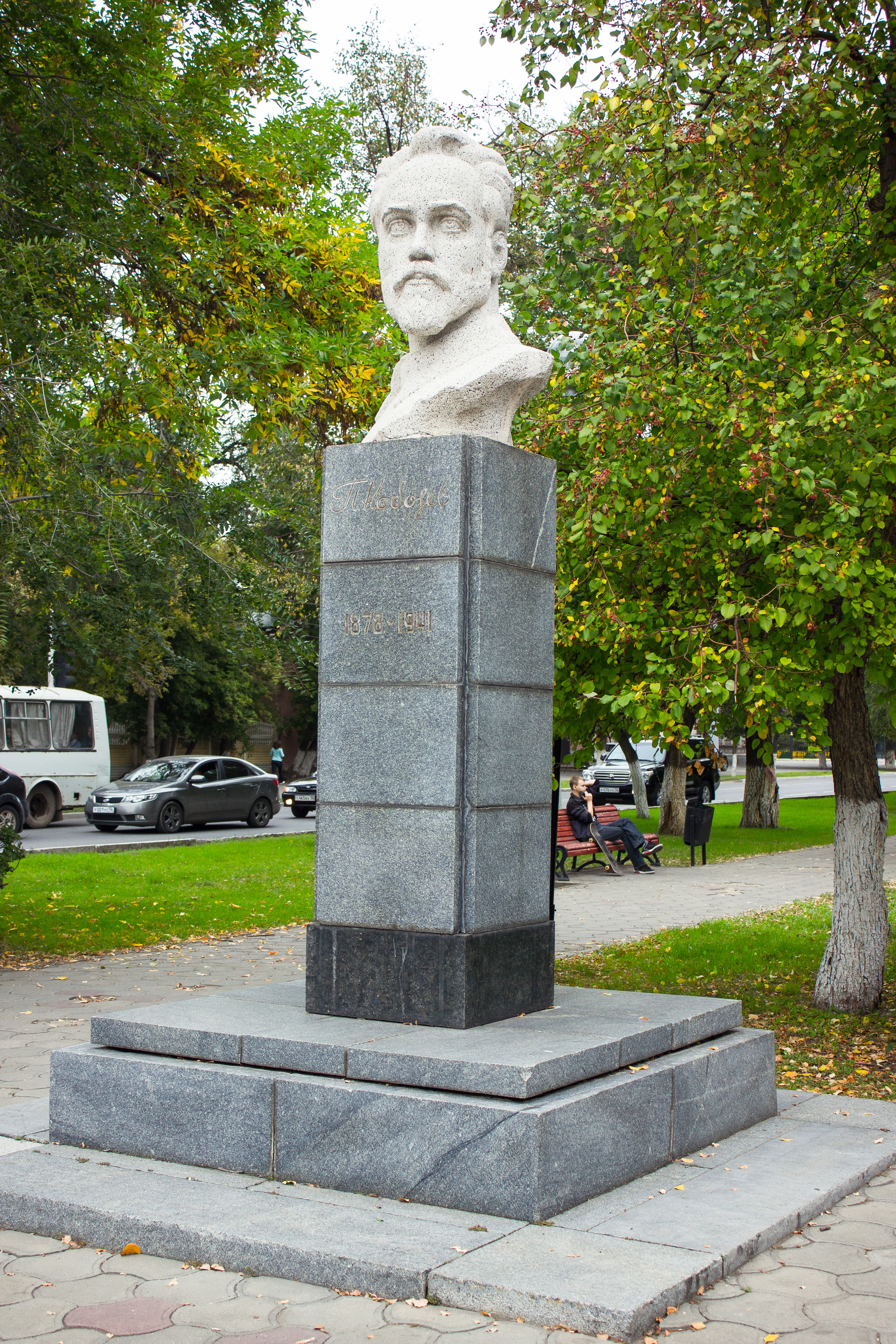
Monument to Pyotr Kobozev in Orenburg

In autumn 1923, the severely ill Pyotr Kobozev returned to Moscow and asked to be transferred to academic work. In 1923 – 1928 he was the rector of Moscow Land Survey Institute; since 1928 to 1929 – the rector of Leningrad Polytechnical Institute. Later he returned to Moscow Land Survey Institute where he organized the department of aerial survey.

In 1938 he received the degree of candidate of technical sciences. He gave lectures on project geometry, hydraulics and aerial surveying. He was the head of the National Scientific Institute of Locomotive Construction, took part in organizing building the Moskva-Volga Canal, and gave the technical conclusion on the project of Dnieper Hydroelectric Station.

== Family ==
Spouse: Alevtina Ivanovna Rakitina (1880–1968).

Children: Sofia (born 1899, Moscow), Anna (b. 1906), Andrey (b. 1908–1965), a lecturer and musician, twins Nikolay (1913–1977), engineer, and Natalia (b. 1913–1991).

Pyotr Kobozev lived in Moscow in the 3rd House of the Soviets.

== Bibliography ==
- Fighting for the masses. For the power of the Soviets. Memoirs of the participants of the Civil war in Orenburg (Russian: В борьбе за массы.—За власть Советов. Воспоминания участников гражданской войны в Оренбурге. Чкалов, 1957).
- Fighting Dutov's movement, part of the Book 'Kazakhstan in the flame of the civil war' (Russian: Борьба с дутовщиной.— В кн.: Казахстан в огне гражданской войны. Алма-Ата, 1960).

== Legacy ==
=== In popular culture ===
Kobozev was mentioned in the book Ten Days That Shook the World by John Reed. Kobozev (played by Armen Djigarkhanyan) is also a character in the Uzbek 1970 film 'Extraordinary comissar' (Russian: Чрезвычайный комиссар) about the years of the Soviet regime establishment in Turkestan.

=== Memorials ===
In Orenburg, there is a monument dedicated to Kobozev. It was set up in 1957. Its location is the park at the intersection of the Kobozev and Postnikov streets. It is a bust created by A. Chernikova. Streets in a number of cities are named after Kobozev: Orenburg, Baku, Aktobe, Samara, Ulyanovsk, Donetsk, Yekaterinburg and Vladivostok.
