= Alexander Krasnoshchyokov =

Soviet politician, leader of the Far Eastern Republic (1880–1937)

- Александр Краснощёков
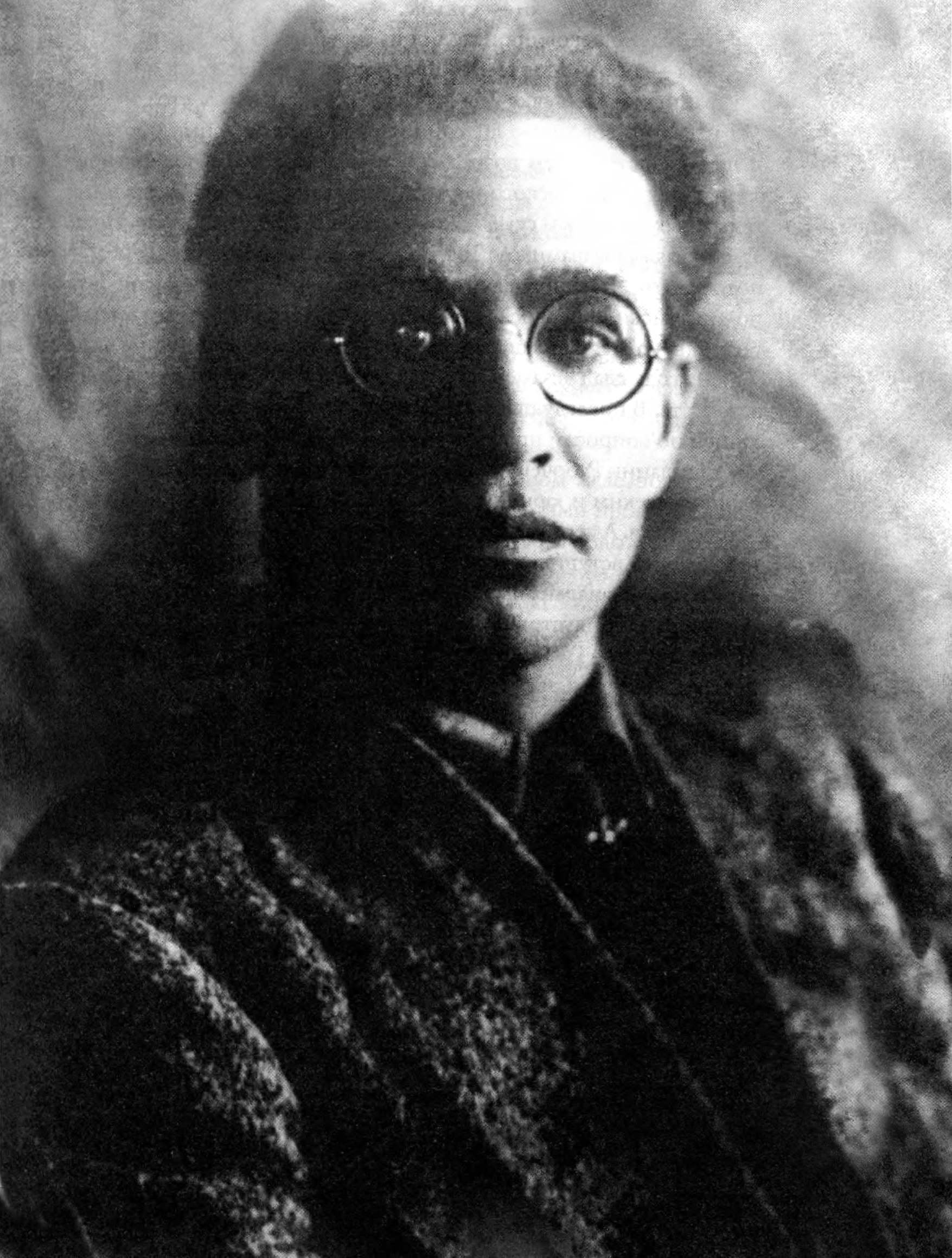

1st Chairman of the Government of the Far Eastern Republic
- In office 6 April 1920 – 15 September 1921
- Succeeded by: Nikolay Matveyev

1st Chairmen of the Council of Ministers of the Far Eastern Republic
- In office 6 April 1920 – November 1920
- Succeeded by: Boris Shumyatsky

1st Minister of Foreign Affairs of the Far Eastern Republic
- In office 6 April 1920 – June 1920
- Succeeded by: Boris Shumyatsky

Personal details
- Born: Avraam Moiseevich Krasnoshchyok; 10 October 1880 [O.S. 28 September] Chernobyl, Radomyslsky Uyezd, Kiev Governorate, Russian Empire
- Died: 26 November 1937 (aged 57) Donskoye Cemetery, Moscow, Russian SFSR, Soviet Union
- Education: University of Chicago

Alexander Mikhailovich Krasnoshchyokov (Russian: Алекса́ндр Миха́йлович Краснощёков), real name Avraam Moiseyevich Krasnoshchyok (Russian: Абра́м Моисе́евич Краснощёк; 10 October 1880 – 26 November 1937), was a Soviet politician and the first leader of the Far Eastern Republic. On November 25, 1937, he was sentenced to death by the Military Collegium of the Supreme Court of the USSR.

== Early life ==
Born at Chernobyl, son of a Jewish shop assistant, he joined an illegal Marxist group as a teenager in 1896, and the Russian Social Democratic Labour Party soon after it was founded. He was arrested in 1898 and briefly imprisoned, before being exiled to Nikolaievsk where he met Leon Trotsky. After his release he returned to Ukraine where he joined Martov in political agitation and organised a workers association in Ekaterinoslav. He was again arrested and imprisoned in 1901. On his release he found himself under constant police surveillance and in November 1902 escaped to Berlin to avoid exile in Siberia. In March 1903, he emigrated to the USA. His first job there was as a house painter. Later, he became a headmaster. He joined the Socialist Labor Party of America and worked as an agitator for the American Federation of Labor. Later he started studying at the University of Chicago at the Law School. In 1912 Alexander Krasnoshchyokov graduated from the university and started to work as lawyer. He defended striking workers in the 'Bread and Roses Strike' of 1913. After the February Revolution, he decided to return to Russia, travelling by ship from Vancouver via Japan, where he was interviewed by agents of the Russian Provisional Government.

== Return to Russia ==
Krasnoshchyokov described his return to Russia in his memoirs: "I arrived in Vladivostok at the end of July 1917, and immediately joined the Bolshevik faction, was elected to the Soviet in August, and in September was elected to the town duma in Nikolsko-Ussuriysk and President of the Soviet of workers' and soldiers' deputies to represent the Bolsheviks."

After the Bolsheviks seized power in Petrograd (St Petersburg) in November 1917, Krasnoshchyokov led the drive to establish the new government's authority in the far east, against local resistance. He was president of the Far Eastern Soviet of People's Commissars, which was established in Khabarovsk in December 1917, and for about four months in summer 1918 had control of the entire Russian far east, until it was overthrown by the intervention of Czech, Japanese, British and American forces. Krasnoshchyokov then fled across the taiga, trying to reach territory controlled by the Red Army, but was captured near Samara and sent by 'death train' across Siberia to Irkutsk prison. He was released when the local administration in Irkutsk was overthrown by rioters on 28 December 1919.

== Far Eastern Republic ==
In January 1920, with the civil war nearing an end, Krasnoshchyokov crossed the front line to reach Red Army headquarters in Tomsk, and persuaded Vladimir Lenin to create a buffer state in the far east, to enable the allied troops in Siberia to withdraw without loss of face. He wrote the constitution of the Far Eastern Republic in English, before it was translated into Russian, served as first minister and minister for foreign affairs of the Far Eastern Republic from April 1920 to July 1921, and generally made a very good impression on the British and Americans who met him during this period, particularly the journalist H.K.Norton, who wrote an entire book eulogising Krasnoshchyokov's career.

The republic was recognised by the Japanese Army Command on 11 May 1920, and by Soviet Russia on 16 May 1920. Thanks to his efforts, the Gongota Agreement was signed 15 July 1920 with General Takayanagi of the Japanese Expeditionary Corps. This established a neutral zone between Verkhne-Udinsk and Chita, allowing the Japanese forces, who were under constant pressure from partisans, to withdraw from Transbaikalia without losing face. The Japanese completed this withdrawal (15 October 1920), and Chita was occupied by the partisan NRA 22 October 1920 despite some resistance by the White forces under General Verzhbitsky, who then withdrew south to join Semyonov in Manchuria. Krasnoshchyokov met General Eiche at Chita in early November and Chita became the capital of a state as large as Western Europe. The union of the FER with the Maritime province was finalised 10 November 1920.

== Move to Moscow ==
Krasnoshchokov's speech on the moving of the Government to Chita

Krasnoshchyokov was removed from office in April, ostensibly because he had contracted tuberculosis, though the real cause appears to have been that local Bolsheviks objected to his leadership style. In December 1921, he was appointed Second Deputy USSR People's Commissar in the People's Commissariat for Finance (Narkomfin), by Lenin, but against the objections of more left wing Bolsheviks, including the future Trotskyist, Yevgeni Preobrazhensky, who threatened to resign if the appointment was confirmed. In January, Lenin sent a note to the Politburo praising Krasnoshchyokov's "practical approach to financial matters" and insisting that the Politburo back the appointment "to the hilt".

In March 1922, Krasnoshchyokov contracted typhus, and during his absence, his rivals at Narkomfin sacked him. This evoked a long letter from Lenin to Molotov complaining that "We have harassed this man, who undoubtedly has brains, energy, knowledge and experience...We have done everything possible and impossible to repulse this highly energetic, intelligent and valuable worker" and insisting that he be appointed to the Presidium of Vesenkha The appointment was confirmed by the Politburo in April 1922. He used the opportunity in November 1922 to create Prombank, a new bank to promote trade and industry, leaving the state bank with only the regulation of money and credit, much to the annoyance of the Narkomfin.

In 1922 the American journalist Anna Louise Strong interviewed Krasnoshchyokov about the New Economic Policy (NEP) and about the departure from war communism. Krasnoshchyokov said:

We must say frankly to the people, "Your government cannot feed all and produce goods for all. We shall run the most necessary industries and feed the workers in those industries. The rest of you must feed yourselves in any way you can." This means we must allow private trade and private workshops; it is well if they succeed enough to feed those people who work in them, since no one else can feed them. Later, as state industries produce a surplus, these will expand and drive out private trade.

== Arrest and trial ==
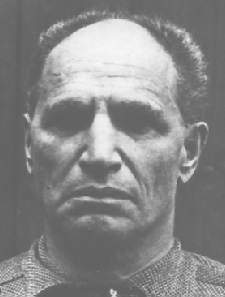
After arrest by NKVD 1937

When Lenin had his third stroke in March 1923, Krasnoshchyokov lost his only protector. He had made powerful enemies, and appears to have become a focus for resentment against private entrepreneurs who were making money in the relaxed conditions of the New Economic Policy, often in enterprises built on loans provided by Krasnoshchyokov's bank. He was arrested on 19 September 1924 on charges of corruption. Two weeks later, he was denounced in Pravda and Izvestiya by the People's Commissar for Workers' and Peasants' Inspection, Kuybyshev, who accused him of using state funds to pay for "disgraceful drunken sprees, enrich his relatives and so on.". It was the first time since the revolution that an eminent Bolshevik had been arrested, and was an overt challenge to Lenin's authority, and created a sensation. Vladimir Ipatiev, a scientist with no affiliation to the Bolsheviks, who was working in Moscow at the time, wrote in his memoirs that "rumours of his wild living were current throughout the city." Ipatiev was also probably repeating common gossip in his description of Krasnoshchyokov as "a resourceful, capable man but self-centred and hardly a communist out of conviction."

Krasnoshchyokov was tried in March 1924, along with his brother, Yakov, and four bank employees. The main charge a was that the bank had loaned Yakov a large sum at a favourable rate to enable him to set up a privately owned construction firm. He was also accused of paying himself an inflated salary. All six defendants denied the charges, but were found guilty. Alexander Krasnoshchyokov was sentenced to six years in prison and expelled from the communist party. His brother was sentenced to three years, and the other defendants to shorter terms.

== Mayakovsky and Lili Brik ==
In 1922, Krasnoshchyokov had also begun a love affair with Lili Brik, whose most famous lover was the poet Vladimir Mayakovsky. Mayakovsky and Brik took care of his daughter, Llewella while he was in prison. In November 1924, Mayakovsky wrote to Brik from Paris complaining: "I love you but all the same you are either someone else's or not mine". She replied: "What can be done about it? I cannot give up A.M. while he is in prison. It would be shameful! More shameful than anything in my entire life." Mayakovsky replied: "Are you really trying to tell me that is...the only thing that prevents you from being with me?" .

== Later life ==
Krasnoshchyokov was held in the Lefortovo prison in Moscow, where he contracted pneumonia in November 1924. He was transferred then to the government hospital near the Kremlin. He was released under amnesty in January 1925 and sent to Yalta to recover. He returned to Moscow in autumn 1925 to work for the Ministry of Agriculture and devoted his energies to improving the cotton crop in Central Asia. By 1930 he was head of an institute dedicated to development of cotton and other fibre crops. He married Donna Gruz and they had twin girls in 1934. He was arrested in July 1937, sentenced to death for espionage on 25 November, and was one of several prominent former Bolsheviks shot on 26 November 1937. He was rehabilitated posthumously in 1956, three years after Stalin's death.

== See also ==
- Outline of the Russian Revolution and Civil War
- Bibliography of the Russian Revolution and Civil War
- Bibliography of Stalinism and the Soviet Union
- Index of Old Bolsheviks
- Index of articles related to the Russian Revolution and Civil War
