= Nikolay Matveyev =

Soviet politician

- Николай Михайлович Матвеев

1st Chairman of the Government of the Far Eastern Republic
- In office 15 September 1921 – 15 November 1922
- Preceded by: Alexander Krasnoshchyokov
- Succeeded by: Position abolished

Personal details
- Born: Nikolay Mikhailovich Matveyev; 22 May 1877 Bogdat, Nerchinsko-Zavodsky District, Russian Empire
- Died: 26 April 1951 (aged 73) Moscow, Russian SFSR, Soviet Union

Nikolay Mikhailovich Matveyev (Russian: Николай Михайлович Матвеев) (22 May 1877 – 26 April 1951) was a Soviet politician who was the second and last president of the Far Eastern Republic.

== Early life ==
Nikolai Mikhailovich Matveyev was born in Bogdat, Nerchinsko-Zavodsky District, Russian Empire, on 22 May 1877. He graduated from the Nerchinsk-Zavodskoye Mining School in 1896, and the military cadet school in Irkutsk. He was a land surveyor for the Baikal Cossacks and was a member of its military economic board in 1917.

== Russian Civil War ==
Matveyev became a member of the Russian Social Democratic Labour Party in 1917. He participated in the 1st Regional Congress of Soviets of the Zabaikalsky region. He was elected to the People's Council and was made deputy commissar for military affairs. He was appointed People's Commissar of Internal Affairs of the KSO in February 1918, after the Soviets established control over the region. He was made head of the Zabaikalsky Council of People's Commissar on 5 April 1918. He joined the Siberian Council of People's Commissars.

Matveyev was arrested after the Soviets lost control of the region. He was released in February 1920, and made head of the political department of the Soviet army in Amur. He was transferred to work in the Far Eastern Republic in December 1920, and became its minister of war. He became chair of the government in 1922.

== Later life ==
After the end of the Russian Civil War, Matveyev worked in political and economic affairs. He was consul general of the Soviet Union in Tianjin and Korea.

Matveyev died in Moscow on 26 April 1951.

== Works cited ==
- "Матвеев Н.М." [Matveev N.M.] (in Russian). Encyclopedia of Transbaikalia. Archived from the original on 20 November 2026.
- "Матвеев Николай Михайлович" [Matveev Nikolay Mikhailovich] (in Russian). Handbook on History of the Communist Party and the Soviet Union 1898–1991. Archived from the original on 10 March 2026.
