= Spiridon Merkulov =

Russian politician

- Спиридон Меркулов
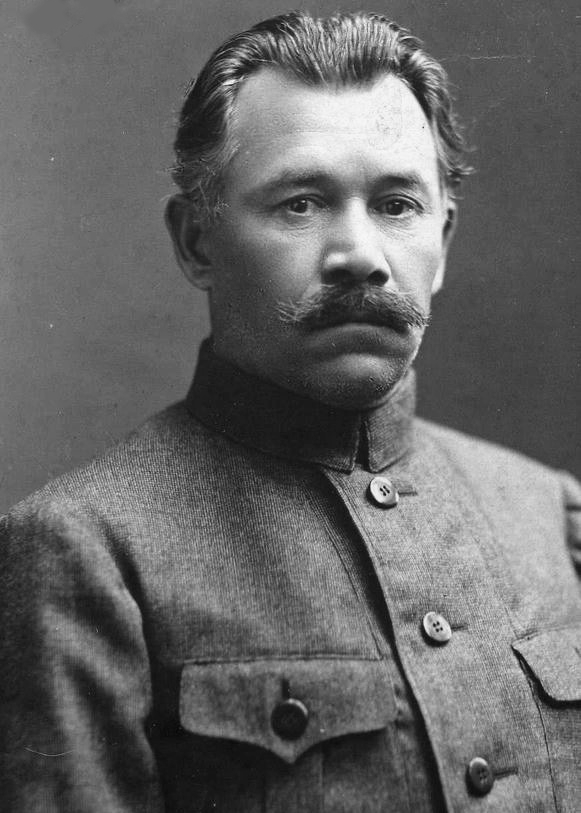
- Merkulov in 1922

Chairman of the Provisional Priamurye Government
- In office 26 May 1921 – 23 July 1922
- Preceded by: Office established
- Succeeded by: Office abolished

Personal details
- Born: Spiridon Dionisevich Merkulov; 1870 Blagoveshchensk, Amur Oblast, Russian Empire
- Died: 1957 (aged 87) San Francisco, California, USA
- Party: White Movement
- Education: Saint Petersburg Imperial University

Spiridon Dionisevich Merkulov (Russian: Спиридон Дионисьевич Меркулов; 1870 – 1957), was a Russian politician who played a significant role in the Russian Civil War, particularly in the Far East. He briefly led the Provisional Priamurye Government from May 1921 to July 1922.

Born into a farming family in Amur, Merkulov pursued a law degree at Saint Petersburg Imperial University. He later worked for the Ministry of State Property before settling in Vladivostok, where he served as a legal adviser to the city government and held roles such as chief inspector at the Northern Insurance Company.

On 26 May 1921, following a coup by White forces in Primorye, Merkulov was appointed chairman of the Provisional Priamurye Government, overseeing modern-day Primorsky Krai and parts of Khabarovsk Krai.

However, in the summer of 1922, his government was replaced by the Zemsky Sobor of the Amur region, led by General Mikhail Diterikhs, who imposed a military dictatorship. Merkulov was travelling to Japan and Canada in September. In October 1922, the Red Army captured Vladivostok, and Merkulov unable to return to Russia. He settled in San Francisco, US, where he lived for the rest of his life. He died in 1957.

== See also ==
- Provisional Priamurye Government
- Mikhail Diterikhs
