= Vasily Yakovlev =

Bolshevik revolutionary and politician

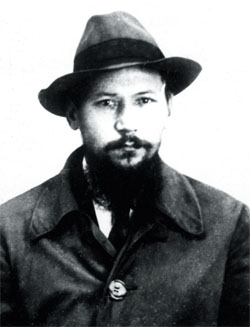
Yakovlev c. 1911

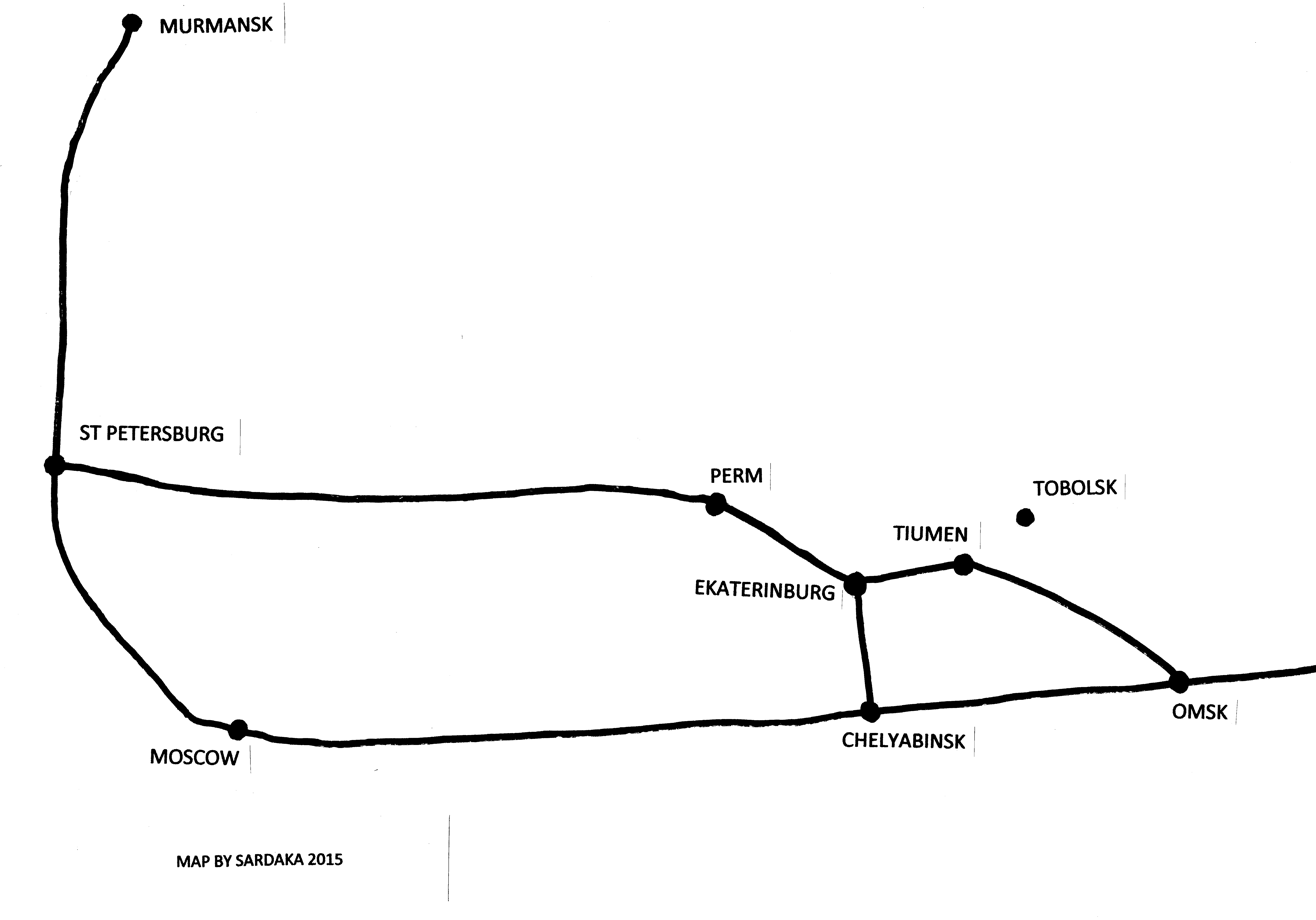
Location of the main events in the last days of Nicholas II and his family, who were held at Tobolsk from August 1917 to April 1918 before being transported to Ekaterinburg, where they were held for ten weeks before being murdered

Vasily Vasilyevich Yakovlev (Russian: Васи́лий Васи́льевич Я́ковлев; 29 August [O.S. 17 August] 1885 – 16 September 1938) was a Russian Old Bolshevik revolutionary and politician. He participated in the October Revolution of 1917; was a Cheka officer for a few months; transferred former Russian Emperor Nicholas II and his family to Yekaterinburg, where they were later killed; rose to become a commander in the Red Army during the Russian Civil War; fled to China after being captured and released by the White Army, where he became a government advisor; and returned to the Soviet Union in 1928, where he was arrested for desertion and treason, and imprisoned; released in 1933, he was arrested again in 1938 for treason and executed during the Great Purge. Yakovlev was portrayed by the actor Ian Holm in the 1971 film Nicholas and Alexandra.

== Political career ==
Vasily Yakovlev was born Konstantin Alekseyevich Mâčin on 29 August [O.S. 17 August] 1885 in Sharlyk to the family of Aleksey Mâčin, a Latvian engineer. In 1901 he was recruited as a sailor and studied electrical engineering in Helsinki, where in 1905 he joined the Bolshevik faction of the Russian Social Democratic Labour Party and participated in an uprising of sailors. After being sentenced to death in absentia by a military court, he went into hiding under the name Vasily Vasilyevich Yakovlev.

He participated in many acts of sabotage and terrorism, including an armed train robbery through which he seized approximately 1.5 pounds of gold, which was invested into the Party. He managed to escape to Brussels, Belgium, where he worked as an electrician. He was active in Party causes there, and briefly lived in Canada and Germany. After the February Revolution of 1917, in March he returned to Russia through Stockholm. He was an active member of the Petrograd Soviet, of which he became a deputy commander and a military librarian.

During the October Revolution of 1917 he participated in the capture of the Winter Palace, after which he became the commissioner of the central telephone exchange of Petrograd, and was also a delegate at the Second All-Russian Congress of Soviets.

== Last days of the Tsar ==
In March 1918, Yakovlev was appointed by the Central Executive Committee to oversee the transfer of former Russian Tsar Nicholas II and his family from Tobolsk to Omsk (or Moscow according to other sources), where Nicholas was to be put on trial. The train departed on April 17 but due to the advancement of White Army soldiers loyal to Admiral Aleksandr Kolchak, who were blockading the railway as part of the ongoing civil war, orders from Moscow led to Yakovlev diverting the train to Yekaterinburg instead, where it arrived on April 30. The family were then seized by the Ural Regional Soviet and held prisoner in the Ipatiev House until July 17, when they and four retainers were executed.

The above account contradicts that in Robert Massie's book Nicholas and Alexandra, which states that Yakovlev defected from the Bolsheviks and joined the White armies. It describes Yakovlev as being motivated by the desire to save the Imperial family to the extent that he was following his orders, which were to take the family to Moscow.

In Massie's account, Yakovlev arrived at Tobolsk on 22 April, accompanied by one hundred and fifty horsemen and his own private telegraph operator, through whom he could communicate directly with the Kremlin. He carried documents that stated that he should be cooperated with fully, on pain of death. He showed these documents to Eugene Kobylinsky, the officer in charge at Tobolsk. On 25 April, Yakovlev informed Kobylinsky that his mission was to take the Imperial family away from Tobolsk. He did not say at that stage that he was going to take them to Moscow, but those were his orders. However, Yakovlev soon found that Alexei, formerly the heir to the throne, was seriously ill. He communicated this to Moscow, and was told to only take Nicholas. Alexandra, the former empress, decided to go with Nicholas, accompanied by her daughter Maria.

Yakovlev, his troops and his royal prisoners then travelled over three hundred and twenty kilometres to Tyumen, the site of the nearest railway station, with the members of the Imperial family riding in horse-drawn carts. Once at Tyumen, however, Yakovlev came to the conclusion that it would be too dangerous to go through Yekaterinburg because the Ural Regional Soviet would seize his prisoners. He therefore decided to make a detour to Omsk, over five hundred kilometres south-east of Tyumen, from where he could proceed to Moscow without going through Yekaterinburg. However, when the party reached Kulomzino, ninety-six kilometres from Omsk, they were intercepted by troops who had been alerted by the Ural Regional Soviet. Yakovlev then went into Omsk to argue his case with the Omsk Soviet, but could not convince them. He contacted Sverdlov by telegram and was told to take the Imperial family to Yekaterinburg. Acting on Sverdlov's instructions, he proceeded to Yekaterinburg, where the train was surrounded by troops; the members of the Imperial family were then taken away by officials of the Ural Regional Soviet.

Massie's version is supported by Shay McNeal in The Plots to Rescue the Tsar. In McNeal's account, Yakovlev was trying to follow his orders to take the Imperial family to Moscow. In various telegrams to Moscow, he made it clear that it was not safe to take the family through Ekaterinburg, in the Ural Mountains (the most direct route to Moscow), because he was sure the Ural Regional Soviet would seize the family. He only agreed to go through Ekaterinburg because Yakov Sverdlov told him to.

This view is also supported by Mark D. Steinberg and Vladimir M. Khrustalev in The Fall of the Romanovs. The authors quote a telegram from Yakovlev to Filipp Goloshchekin, dated 27 April 1918, in which Yakovlev stated that Goloshchekin's detachments had the desire to destroy the Imperial family (referred to as "the baggage"). He states that he has taken a prisoner who had confessed everything, and that if "the baggage" was not handed over to them, their intention was to destroy the whole detachment, including Yakovlev himself. In a telegram dated 27 April 1918, he states that the Ekaterinburg detachments have only the single goal of destroying "the baggage" at all costs. Finally, he states that if "the baggage" falls into the hands of the Ekaterinburg detachment, it will be destroyed.

After the Imperial family had been taken off his hands, Yakovlev returned to Moscow, where on May 15 he was appointed Commander-in-Chief of the Red Army's Ural Front, and in June Commander of the Army. He was captured and arrested by White forces in November — having tried to infiltrate them since October — but was released in 1919 and fled to Harbin, China, where in 1921 he became an adviser to the republican government under the name Konstantin Alekseyevich Stoyanovich. He returned to Moscow in 1928, was immediately convicted of treason and imprisoned until 1933. He was released shortly after, but in 1938 — during the Great Purge — was again convicted of treason and executed on September 16.

Later, according to Massie, the Bolsheviks claimed that Yakovlev's actions in regard to the Imperial family had actually been part of a monarchist escape attempt.

== Description ==
Robert Massie maintains that an air of mystery surrounded Yakovlev from the moment he arrived at Tobolsk. After arriving, he had tea with the former Tsar and Tsarina, but without informing them of his mission. In their writings, they observed that he was about thirty-two or thirty-three years old, was tall and muscular and had black hair. He was dressed like a sailor but gave the impression of having a more cultured background, with a more refined language. He addressed the former Tsar as "Your majesty." He greeted the children's tutor, Pierre Gilliard, by saying, "Bonjour, monsieur." His fingers were long and thin, his hands were clean.

Shay McNeal says it is interesting to see how Yakovlev has been treated in various books on the subject. He is given the "utmost respect" by Aleksandr Kerensky; by the journalist Robert Wilton, who was an operative in the pay of the British Foreign Office; by Paul Bulygin, who was in command of the personal guard of the Dowager Empress Maria; and by Baroness Buxhoeveden, lady-in-waiting to the Tsarina. McNeal comments that such "soft treatment" was never afforded by Tsarist sympathizers to any other Bolshevik.
