= Pyotr Nikiforov =

Pyotr Mikhailovich Nikiforov
- Пётр Михайлович Никbфоров
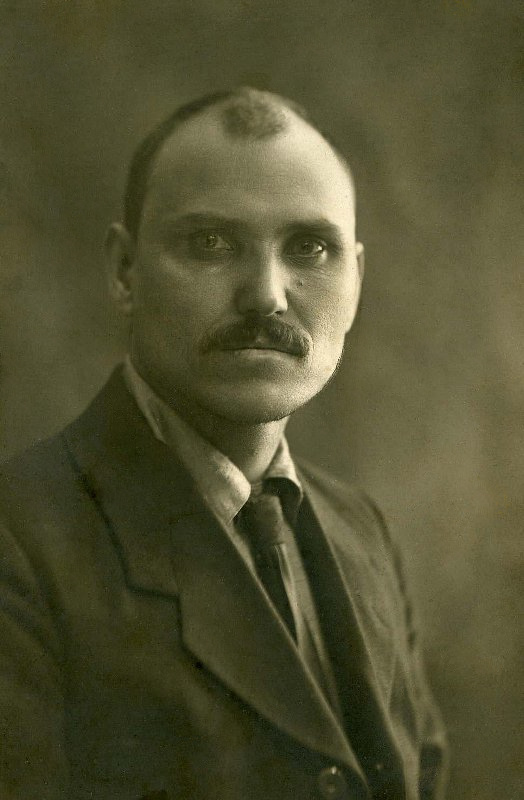
- Pyotr Nikiforov in 1922
- Born: October 12, 1882; Irkutsk Governorate, Russian Empire
- Died: January 6, 1974 (aged 92); Moscow, USSR

Pyotr Mikhailovich Nikiforov (Russian: Петр Михайлович Никифоров) (October 12, 1882, Irkutsk Governorate – January 6, 1974, Moscow) was a Russian revolutionary, Soviet politician, and the third Chairman of the Council of Ministers of the Far Eastern Republic.

He was a sailor of the Russian Baltic Fleet and participant of the uprising at Kronshtadt of 1905. Nikiforov was an activist of the Russian revolution working countrywide. In 1910 he attempted to organize a military unit but was arrested and sentenced for 20 years. After the February Revolution Nikiforov was released and moved to Vladivostok where he became a deputy of the head of Vladivostok Council and the member of the DalBuro of the Russian Social Democratic Labour Party (RSDLP). After the fall of the Soviets in June, 1918 Nikiforov was arrested and spent a year and a half in prison. After his release in January, 1920 he joined the Far Eastern Republic Government and was the Chairman of the Council of Ministers from May 8, 1921, to December 1921. After the "reunion" of the RSFSR and the Far Eastern Republic in 1922 Nikiforov served in many Soviet posts until his retirement.

He was an author of memoirs on the revolutionary movement in his later life.

== Awards ==
- Order of Lenin
- Order of the Badge of Honour
- 1972 – Order of the October Revolution
