= Zemskaya Rat =

The Zemskaya Rat or Zemstvo Host (Russian: Земская рать) were the White armed forces in the Amur region, formed from the White Guard troops in Primorye, which existed between July and October 1922.

== History ==
The Zemskaya Rat was formed on July 23, 1922, by a decree of Mikhail Diterikhs, new ruler of the Provisional Priamurye Government in the Amur region, who became its supreme commander. The new command took measures to restore the control over and raise the morale of the troops, undermined by defeats inflicted by the Red People's Revolutionary Army of the Far Eastern Republic in the winter and spring of 1922, and the political crisis in the Amur region in June 1922.

In the framework of Diterikhs's policy of restoring the traditional way of life for Russia, the Zemskaya Rat army corps was organized into groups divided into regiments, formed from former brigades. The former regiments were consolidated into battalions and squads. To compensate for the losses incurred by the troops in the Amur region, the mobilization of the young male population was announced. By September 1922, the Zemskaya Rat counted some 6,300 infantry and 1,700 cavalry. The troops were stationed in the larger settlements along the Ussuri Railway. The core of the troops came from the former Far Eastern Army, previously part of the army of General Vladimir Kappel and Ataman Ataman Semyonov. Some notable units that were part of the Zemskaya Rat were remnants of the Izhevsk/Votinsk Rifle Brigade, 8th Kamsky Rifle Division, and remnants of the Transbaikal Cossack Armies.

== Operations ==
The offensive operation against the People's Revolutionary Army troops stationed in Northern Primorye, was launched on September 1, 1922, when the Volga Group began advancing north along the Ussuri railway. However, despite initial successes and the seizure of several railway stations, by September 16, the White Guard troops were forced to withdraw to their original positions and go on the defensive. On October 4, due to the successful offensive of parts of the People's Revolutionary Army, the forces of the Zemskaya Rat were forced to withdraw further. On October 9, they abandoned the Spassk-Dalny fortified area, after which the most combat-ready Volga Group ceased to exist.
In the course of the subsequent battles, by October 16, the Zemskaya Rat was completely defeated. General Diterikhs left the region and the remnants of the troops retreated to the border with Korea or were evacuated through the port of Vladivostok, which remained under the control of the Japanese troops until October 25, 1922.

== Sources ==
- Address to the Army of the Primorie Government
