= Provisional Priamurye Government =

1921–1923 anti-Bolshevik government in the Russian Far East

Provisional Priamurye Government Временное правительство Приамурья (Russian)
- 1921–1923
- Flag

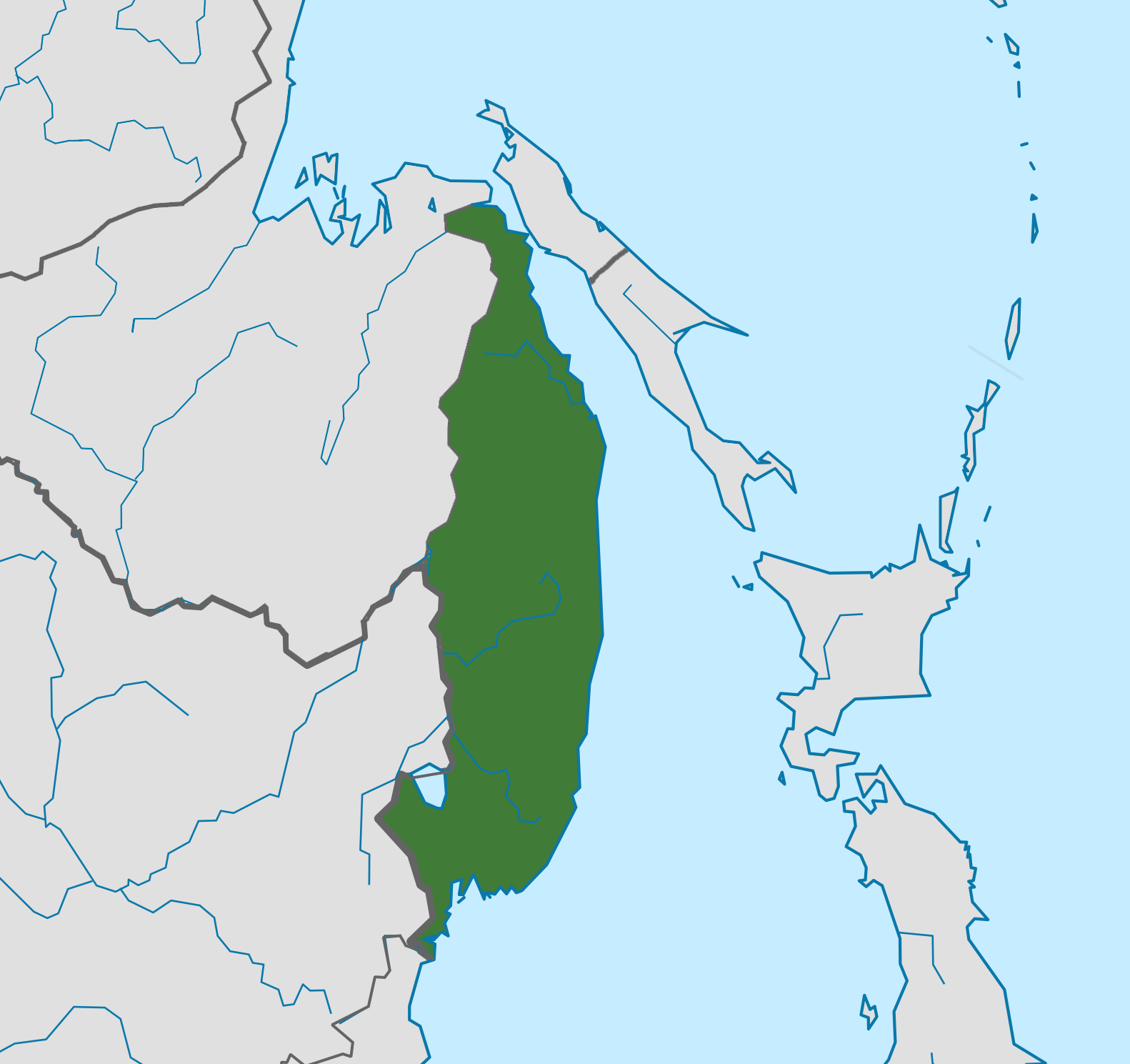
- Status: Provisional government
- Capital: Vladivostok
- Common languages: Russian
  - 1921–1922: Spiridon Merkulov
  - Jun–Oct 1922: Mikhail Diterikhs
  - 1922–1923: Anatoly Pepelyayev (de facto)
- History
  - Established: May 27, 1921
  - Disestablished: June 16, 1923
- ISO 3166 code: RU
Preceded by	Succeeded by
Far Eastern Republic	Soviet Union

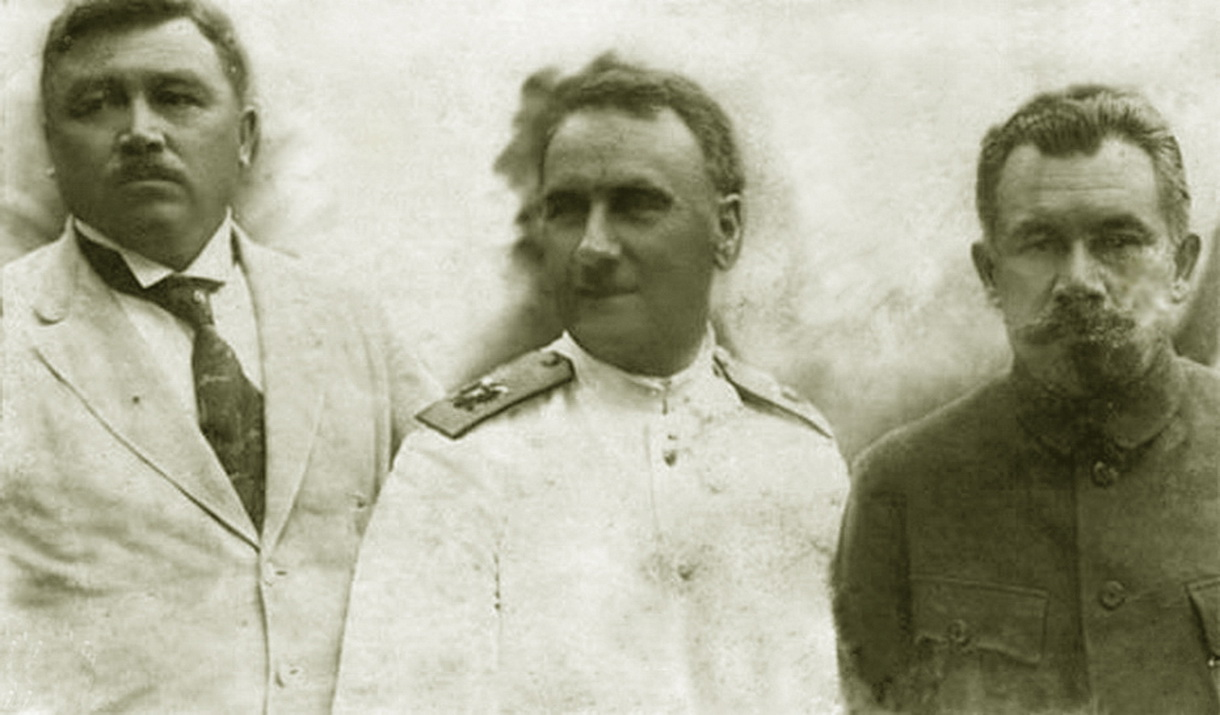
Foreign Minister N. D. Merkulov, Admiral G. K. Stark, Chairman S. D. Merkulov of the Provisional Priamurye Government

The Provisional Priamurye Government or Provisional Priamur Government (Russian: Приамурский земский край) existed in the region of Priamurye of the Russian Far East between May 27, 1921 and June 16, 1923. It was the last Russian State enclave during the Russian Civil War.

== History ==
The government had its origin in a 1921 White Army coup in Vladivostok and its environs. The coup aimed for the Priamurye region to break away from the Far Eastern Republic and to survive behind a cordon sanitaire of Japanese troops involved in the Siberian Intervention. The coup was started on May 23, 1921 by the Kappelevtsy, the remnants of Vladimir Kappel's People's Army of Komuch.

The government was headed by the Merkulov brothers: Spiridon Merkulov, a former functionary of the Ministry of Agriculture and head of the Priamurye government; and Nikolai Dionisovich Merkulov, a merchant. Both had been deputies of the State Duma of the Russian Empire and supporters of the 1917 Russian Provisional Government. Somewhat later in 1921 the Cossack ataman Grigory Semyonov attempted to take power in the Priamurye, but he had no backing from the Japanese and eventually withdrew. The Kappelevtsy and the Semyonovtsy (Semyonov's supporters) despised each other.

Gradually the Priamurye enclave was expanded to Khabarovsk and then to Spassk, 125 miles north of Vladivostok. The Merkulovs were deposed in June 1922 by the Priamurye Zemsky Sobor (Russian: Приамурский Земский Собор) and replaced by one of Admiral Alexander Kolchak's generals, Mikhail Diterikhs.

In July 1922, a Zemsky Sobor (Приамурский Земский Собор) was convened in the territory. This sobor called all Russian people to repent for the overthrow of the Tsar and proclaimed a new Tsar, Grand Duke Nikolai Nikolayevich. Patriarch Tikhon was named as the honorary chairman of the sobor. Neither the Grand Duke nor the Patriarch was present. The territory was renamed Priamursky Zemsky Krai and Diterikhs styled himself voyevoda. The army was renamed the Zemskaya Rat ("Territorial Rat'" - the archaic Slavic term rat' means "military force").

When the Japanese withdrew from the Priamurye (June to October 1922), the Soviet army of the Far Eastern Republic retook most of the Priamurye Government territory. The Ayano-Maysky District was controlled by Anatoly Pepelyayev at that time; its surrender in June 1923 marked the end of the Russian Civil War.

== See also ==
- Far Eastern Federal District
- Allied intervention in the Russian Civil War
- American Expeditionary Force Siberia
- William Sidney Graves
- Sergei Prokofiev
- Green Ukraine (Zelenyi Klyn)
- Siberian Intervention
- Yakut Revolt
- Soviet Central Asia
