= Boris Shumyatsky =

Soviet politician, diplomat, and film producer (1886–1938)

- Борис Шумяцкий
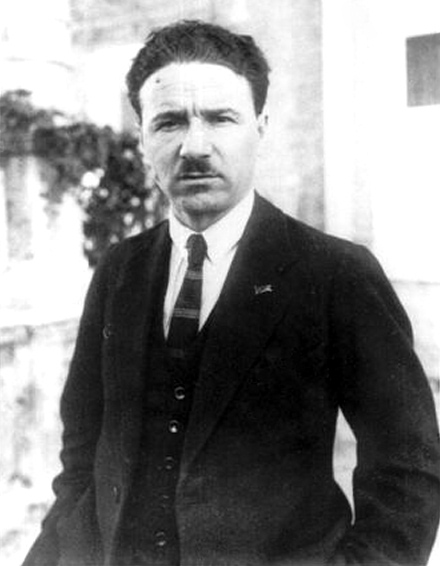
- Boris Shumyatsky in 1924
- Born: 16 November [O.S. 4 November] 1886; Verkhneudinsk, Verkhneudinsky Uyezd, Transbaikal Oblast, Russian Empire (now Ulan-Ude, Republic of Buryatia, Russian Federation)
- Died: July 29, 1938 (aged 51); Kommunarka shooting ground, Leninsky District, Moscow Oblast, Russian SFSR, Soviet Union (now Novomoskovsky Administrative Okrug, Moscow, Russian Federation)
- Citizenship: Russian Empire; Far Eastern Republic; Soviet Union
- Awards: Several others (see below)

Boris Zakharovich Shumyatsky (Russian: Борис Захарович Шумяцкий; 16 November [O.S. 4 November] 1886 – 29 July 1938) was a Soviet politician, diplomat and the de facto executive producer for the Soviet film monopolies Soyuzkino and GUKF from 1930 to 1937. He was executed as a traitor in 1938, following a purge of the Soviet film industry, and much information about him was expunged from the public record as a consequence.

== Early life and career ==
Shumyatsky's father worked as a bookbinder in St Petersburg. After the assassination of the Tsar, Alexander II, Jews were evicted from the Russian capital to the Pale of Settlement. Zakhar Shumyatsky pleaded to be allowed to continue living in a city, where he could continue working, and was deported Verkhneudinsk (now Ulan-Ude) in the vicinity of Lake Baikal in Russian Siberia, where Boris Zakharovich was born. The family was registered there as peasants. At the age of 12, Boris Shumyatsky worked on the railways in Chita, where he joined the Bolshevik wing of the Russian Social Democratic Labour Party (RSDLP) in 1903. The following year, he went to work at the Krasnoyarsk railway depot. During the 1905 revolution, Shumyatsky led a combat unit of about 800 who barricaded themselves in the railways workshops. He was arrested in January 1906, as the revolt was suppressed, but escaped and worked underground in Verkhneudinsk, Chita, and in Vladivostok, where he took part in an armed uprising in 1907. When that failed, he escaped to Argentina. He returned to Russia by 1913, but was arrested and deported to Turukhansk, where Joseph Stalin was also exiled, and was there at the start of World War I, during which he was drafted into the Russian army, and organised a secret Bolshevik group within the Krasnoyarsk garrison.

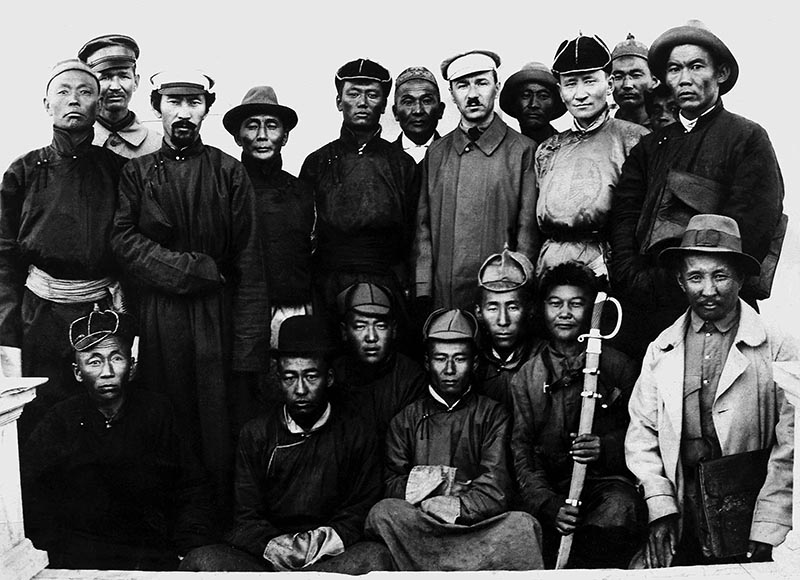
Shumyatskii with Mongolian revolutionaries

After the February Revolution, which overthrew the Tsar, Shumyatsky was elected deputy chairman of the Krasnoyarsk soviet. In May, he was appointed head of the Central Siberian bureau of the Russian Communist Party (Bolshevik). After the Bolsheviks had taken power, in November 1917, he was elected chairman of the Central Executive Committee of the soviets of Siberia. He operated behind enemy lines during the Russian Civil War. In 1920, after the defeat of Admiral Kolchak, he was head of the eastern section of the People's Commissariat for Nationalities, headed by Stalin. in November 1920 to April 1921, he was the head of government of the short-lived Far Eastern Republic. In 1920–21, he founded the Far Eastern Secretariat of Comintern He is credited with being one of the Comintern agents behind the creation of the Mongolian People's Party, founded in Irkutsk in 1920, which went on to form the first communist government of Outer Mongolia. Mongolia's revolutionary hero, Suke Bator reputed adopted Shumyatsky as his twin brother. From 1923 to 1925, he represented Soviet interests in Iran, and after that was in charge of the Communist University of the Toilers of the East, and then a member of the Central Asian Bureau of the Party Central Committee back in Siberia.

== Head of the Film Industry ==
In none of these capacities did he evidently have anything to do with film-making. Nonetheless, following a reorganization of the Soviet film industry he was selected by Stalin to become the head of Soyuzkino in December 1930. When Soyuzkino was dissolved and replaced by GUKF on 11 February 1933, he remained in charge and even with expanded powers over all matters of production, import/export, distribution and exhibition.

He took over the film industry at a time when it was going through major technological changes, and rapid expansion. The number of cinemas in the USSR almost quadrupled under his supervision, to around 30,000, and silent movies were supplanted by 'talkies'. The first Soviet film with a full sound track was released in October 1931. He was also expected to end import of foreign equipment, and blank film when Soviet factories were not well equipped to supply demand, and he had to contend with tightening censorship and Stalin's personal obsession with cinema, which made it expedient to show new films to Stalin before they went on release, and in many cases to submit scripts to Stalin before shooting began.

After visiting Hollywood, he also conceived the idea of creating a similar centre for the film industry at a spot near Odessa, where the climate and geography were similar to those of Hollywood and thus more amenable to year-round film-making. This vision extended to the building of an entire film community, to be called Kinograd—a highly expensive proposition. The output of Soviet films certainly deteriorated in quantity under his supervision: only 35 new films were completed in 1933, compared with 148 in 1928; in 1935, of a planned 130 feature films, only 45 were completed; in 1936, only 46 of 165; in 1937— his final year— only 24 of 62.

This may have been because he was operating under impossible conditions. Alexander Barmine, who worked with Shumyatsky in Tehran, found him "gifted with astounding energy, capable of working all day and all night, eager and uncompromising... the stuff of which leaders are made" and believed that his job as head of the film industry was made impossible by the political demands made on him. By contrast, Jay Leyda, an American student who worked with Sergei Eisenstein, claimed that on the day Shumyatsky was eventually sacked "all of Moscow's film makers gave parties" to celebrate.

Leyda's hostility to Shumyatsky resulted from what he saw as the systematic persecution of Eisenstein, who was prevented from completing a film for the entire time that Shumyatsky headed the film industry. Shumyatsky had a role in the suppression of Eisenstein's unfinished film Bezhin Meadow in 1937, though in the end it was Stalin's decision to ban it. On 18 March 1937 Shumyatsky delivered the opening speech at a three-day conference on cinema, which consisted mainly of an attack on Eisenstein, and on 28 March wrote a letter to Molotov denouncing seven people by name for conspiring to rescue the banned film and "discredit me as the stifler of the 'brilliant work of S. Eisenstein'". Four of those he named were arrested and shot. On 16 April, he sent Stalin a note suggesting that Eisenstein should never be allowed to make another film. He was, if anything, even more hostile to the innovative director, Lev Kuleshov, whom he accused of not understanding the importance of a strong story line in films. He wrote that "a plotless form for a work of art is powerless to express an idea of any significance". He claimed that this and other important lessons for film directors could be learnt by studying the works of Stalin, because "If only we were to collect all the theoretical riches of Joseph Vissarionovich's remarks on cinema, what a critical weapon we would have."

== Arrest and Death ==
On 31 December 1937, Shumyatsky and his wife were summoned to celebrate the New Year at Stalin's dacha, where guests were required to drink a toast to Stalin's health. Shumyatsky, who was teetotal and was repelled by the smell of alcohol, took only a small sip, upon which Stalin demanded to know why a subordinate would not drink to his health. According to his wife, Shumyatsky went home fearing the worst. He was arrested on the night of 17–18 January 1938. On the same day, Pravda carried an excoriating account of his record as the head of the cinema industry. He was accused of collaborating with saboteurs within the film industry. On 28 June 1938 he was sentenced to death and executed by firing squad.

== Honours and awards ==
- Order of Lenin (January 11, 1935)
- Order of the Red Banner (Mongolia) (1926)

== Family ==
Shumyatsky married Liya Isaevna Pandra (1889–1957), who took her husband's surname, a student of a paramedic school, the daughter of a wealthy merchant from the Siberian city of Kansk. She joined the Bolsheviks in 1905. She was arrested on the same night as her husband, but was released late in 1939, because she was then dangerously ill, though unexpectedly, she recovered.

They had two daughters, Yekaterina and Nora. Yekaterina was arrested with her parents on 17 January 1938.

Nora Shumyatskaya (1909–1985) married Lazar Shapiro, (1903–1943), the Chairman of the Fire Brigade Union, who was arrested in September 1937, released in 1940. He became an army captain who was killed in action in October 1943. Their son, Boris Lazarevich Shumyatsky became a prominent art critic, and author of 200 works. She was raped by a colleague while her husband was in prison, and conceived a second son, Andrei, in February 1940, whom she raised with her other son.

Shumyatsky was posthumously rehabilitated, along with his widow and daughter Yekaterina Shumyatskaya in 1956.

== Literature ==
Xenia Joukoff Eudin and Robert C. North, Soviet Russia and the East 1920-1927: A Documentary Survey, Stanford U.P., 1964 Richard Taylor, "Ideology as Mass Entertainment: Boris Shumyatsky and Soviet Cinema in the 1930s", in Richard Taylor and Ian Christie, (eds.), Inside the Film Factory, Routledge Ltd., 1991.
