= Mikhail Diterikhs =

Russian general and White movement leader (1874–1937)

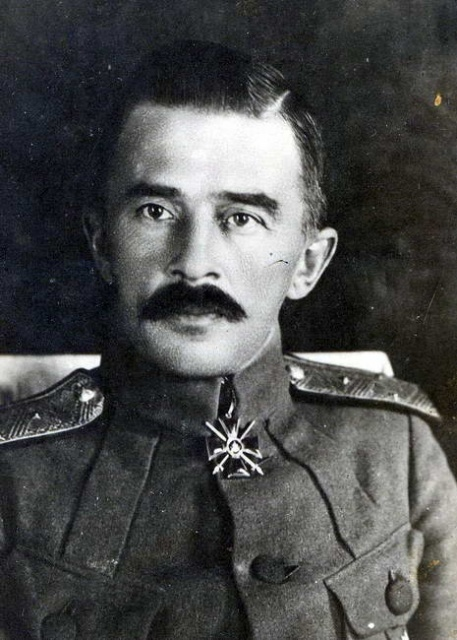
- Diterikhs in 1918
- Born: May 17, 1874; Saint Petersburg, Sankt-Peterburgsky Uyezd, Saint Petersburg Governorate, Russian Empire
- Died: September 9, 1937 (aged 63); Shanghai, Republic of China
- Military career
- Allegiance: Russian Empire; Russian Republic
- Branch: (Russian Empire) Imperial Russian Army (Russian Republic) White Army
- Rank: General
- Commands: Russian Salonika Force; Siberian Army; Zemskaya Rat
- Conflicts: Russo-Japanese War; World War I Russian Civil War

3rd Minister of War of Russian State
- In office 10 August – 27 August 1919
- Supreme Ruler: Alexander Kolchak
- Prime Minister: Pyotr Vologodsky
- Preceded by: Dmitry Lebedev
- Succeeded by: Alexei von Budberg

Voivoda zemsky of the Provisional Priamurye Government
- In office 23 July – 17 October 1922
- Preceded by: Spiridon Merkulov
- Succeeded by: Anatoly Pepelyayev

Mikhail Konstantinovich Diterikhs (Russian: Михаил Константинович Дитерихс; German: Michail Konstantinowitsch Diterichs; May 17, 1874 – September 9, 1937) served as a general in the Imperial Russian Army and subsequently became a key figure in the monarchist White movement in Siberia and the Russian Far East area during the Russian Civil War of 1917–1923.

Descended from Lutheran Sudeten German ancestors who became Baltic Germans, Diterikhs had a reputation as "a deeply religious man, the walls of whose private railway coach were plastered with icons"; he saw himself as "waging a holy war against the Bolshevik heathens".

== Early life and career ==
Diterikhs was born to Konstantin Alexandrovich Diterikhs, who served as a general of the Russian Imperial Army in the Caucasus, and Olga Iosifovna Musintskaya, a Russian noblewoman. His family was of German Bohemian descent, his great-grandfather Johann Gottfried Dieterichs moved from Wolfenbüttel, in the Duchy of Brunswick-Lüneburg, to Waiwara in Estonia during the 18th century. In 1900, Diterikhs graduated from the Page Corps and was assigned a post in the Life Guards 2nd Artillery Brigade. In 1900, he graduated from the Nikolaevsky Military Academy in St. Petersburg. From 1900 to 1903 he served in various staff positions in the Moscow Military District. In 1903 he was appointed commander of the squadron in the 3rd Dragoon Regiment.

== Russo-Japanese War ==
With the start of the Russo-Japanese War in 1904, Diterikhs became chief officer for special duties at the 17th Army Corps headquarters. He arrived at the front in Manchuria in August 1904, and participated in the Battles of Liaoyang, Shaho and Mukden. By the end of the war, he was a lieutenant. After the end of the war he returned to Moscow, and in 1906 was chief officer for special duties at the 7th Army Corps headquarters. The following year, he had the same position at the Kiev Military District headquarters. He was promoted to colonel in 1909. In 1910, he served as a senior aide at the Kiev Military District headquarters. From 1913, Diterikhs was head of the Mobilization Department of the Main Directorate of the General Staff.

== World War I ==
With the start of World War I, Diterikhs was assigned as Chief of Staff for the Russian Third Army on the Southwestern Front under the command of General Aleksei Brusilov, with whom he assisted in planning the Brusilov Offensive in August 1916. In September of the same year, he commanded a Russian expeditionary force in Thessaloniki on the Macedonian front in support of the Serbian Army and fought the Bulgarian army and repelled them successfully in the Monastir offensive.

== Russian Civil War ==
After the February Revolution, Diterikhs was recalled to Russia. In August 1917 the Russian Provisional Government offered Diterikhs the position of Minister of War, which he refused. By November 3, 1917, Diterikhs was promoted to the chief of staff of the Russian army's headquarters, but managed to escape arrest during the Bolshevik revolution. Diterikhs escaped to Kiev, then made his way to Siberia where the Czechoslovak Legions asked him to become their chief of staff and the commander of the fives T. G. Masaryk's rifle regiment too. He helped the Czech Legion to organize their first resistance in May 1918, and commanded their Irkutsk-Chita-Vladivostok armed group.

Diterikhs was ordered by Admiral Kolchak to arrest the Ufa directory but delayed his move. After a few days on November 26, 1918, he finally agreed to obey to Kolchak's order and simultaneously resigned from the Czech Legion after a period of tense relations.

From January to July 1919 Diterikhs personally supervised the Sokolov investigation of the murder of Tsar Nicholas II. Later he published a book on this subject, when he already lived abroad. (Note: The Murder of the Royal Family and members of the House of Romanoffs in the Urals (Убийство Царской семьи и членов Дома Романовых на Урале)) Based on his anti-Semitic views, he tried to present the execution as a ritual murder organized by Jews.

=== Siberian Army ===
In July 1919 Diterikhs took command of the Siberian Army of Admiral Kolchak. He assisted in creation of various paramilitary militias in support of the White movement and the Russian Orthodox Church against the Bolsheviks. In September 1919 he commanded Admiral Kolchak's last successful offensive against the Red Army, the Tobolsk Operation. However, in December 1919 he resigned after a bitter quarrel with Kolchak and emigrated to Harbin in Manchuria.

Periodically Diterikhs figured in the negotiations between the Provisional Priamurye Government and other White forces. On June 8, 1922, Diterikhs returned to take over the Army of Verzhbitski as well as the civil administration. Based in the Amur Krai, Diterikhs proceeded to reorganize the army and civil government, much in the way General Pyotr Wrangel had done in the Crimea two years earlier. Taking a hands-on approach, Diterikhs made efforts to enlist the support of the local population for his cause, calling his battle a religious crusade against Bolshevism. He had also tried, in vain, to convince the Japanese not to withdraw their military support.

In July 1922, Diterikhs negotiated with warlord Zhang Zuolin to ensure that Czech troops would have safe passage to Manchuria in the event of a Bolshevik occupation of the far east. The deal was reached in exchange for Zhang receiving war materiel including over 30,000 rifles and an airplane.

Diterikhs founded the last Zemsky Sobor on Russian soil on July 23, 1922. On August 8, 1922, the sobor declared that the throne of Russia belonged to the House of Romanov in the person of Grand Duke Nikolai Nikolaevich Romanov. It also named Diterikhs as the ruler of the Provisional Priamur Government and its armed forces, called in archaic terms the Zemskaya Rat. On October 25, 1922, the Bolsheviks defeated Diterikhs's army, forcing an evacuation from Vladivostok to China and Korea via Japanese ships.

== Post-war life and death ==
After May 1923 Diterikhs moved from a military refugee camp to Harbin where many White emigres settled. He became the head of the Far East chapter of the Russian All-Military Union organization. Diterikhs died in Shanghai in 1937, where he was buried.

== Honors ==
- Order of St. Stanislaus 3rd degree, 1902
- Order of St. Anne 3rd degree with swords and bow, 1904 (Battle of Liaoyang)
- Order of St Vladimir, 4th degree with swords and bow, 1906
- Order of St. Stanislaus 2nd degree with swords, 1905 (Battle of Mukden)
- Order of St. Anne 2nd degree with swords, 1905
- Order of St. Stanislaus 1st degree with swords, 1915
- Order of White Eagle 2nd Class with Swords, 1916 (Serbia)
- Croix de Guerre, with palm branch, 1916 (France)
- Order of St Vladimir, 2nd degree with swords, 1917
- Legion of Honor, Officer Cross, 1917 (France)
- Order of the Falcon, Military Division with Swords, 1919 (Czechoslovakia)
