= Alfred Meyer-Waldeck =

German naval officer (1864–1928)

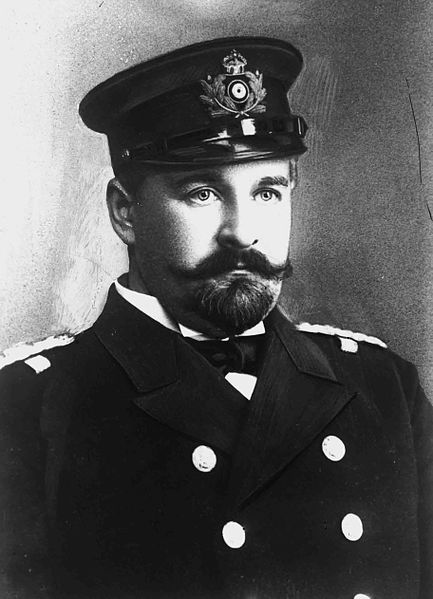
- Alfred Meyer-Waldeck in 1911.
- Born: Alfred Meyer; November 27, 1864; Saint Petersburg, Russian Empire
- Died: August 25, 1928 (aged 63); Bad Kissingen, Germany
- Burial place: Heidelberg, Germany
- Military career
- Allegiance: German Empire
- Branch: Imperial German Navy
- Service years: 1884–1920
- Rank: Vizeadmiral
- Commands: SMS D1
- Conflicts: Boxer Rebellion; World War I; Siege of Tsingtao

Governor of Kiautschou Bay Leased Territory
- In office 19 August 1911 – 7 November 1914
- Monarch: Wilhelm II
- Chancellor: Theobald von Bethmann Hollweg
- State Secretary for the Colonies: Friedrich von Lindequist; Wilhelm Solf
- Preceded by: Wilhelm Höpfner
- Succeeded by: Position abolished (Japanese forces invaded the territory)

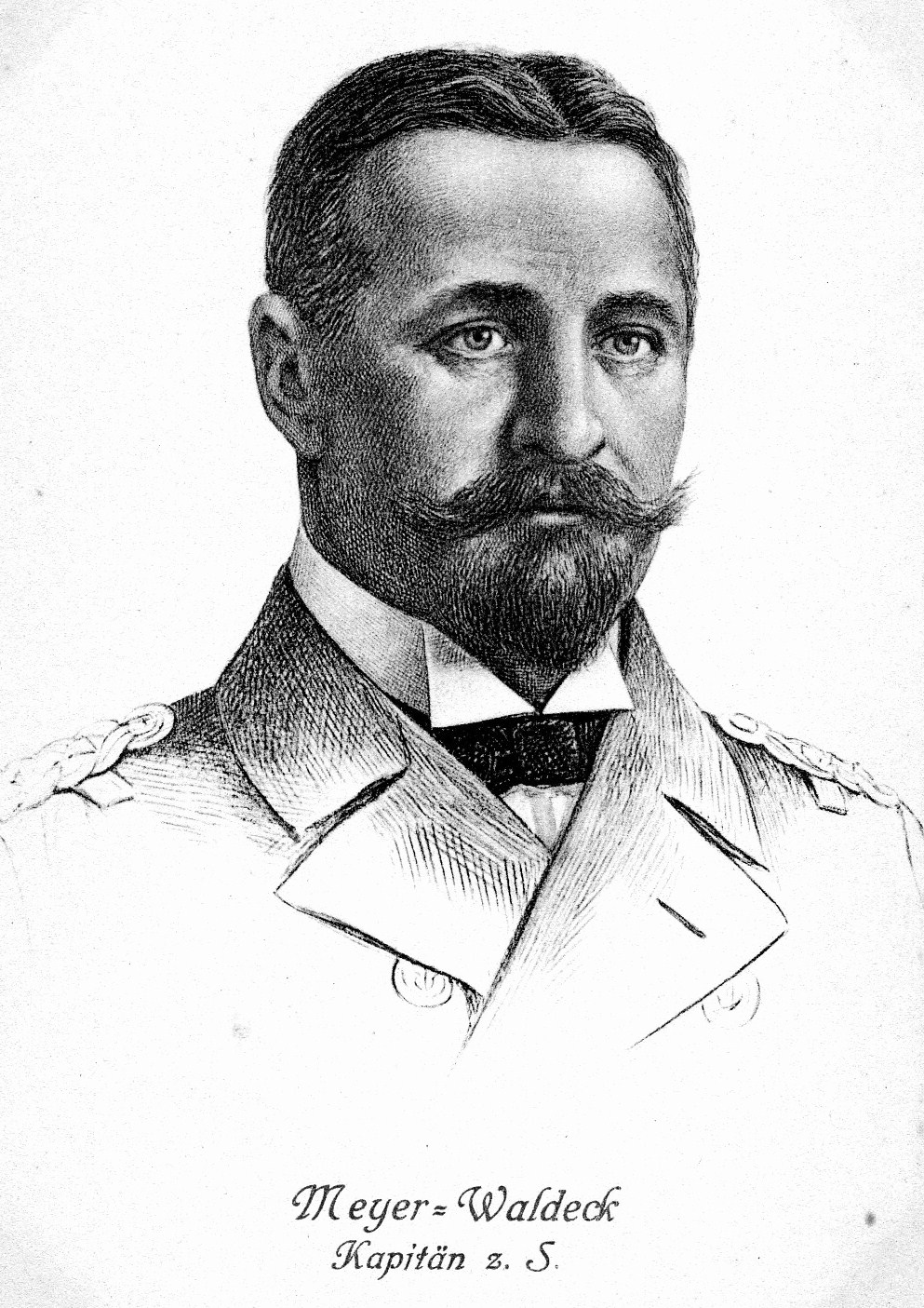
Meyer-Waldeck as a Kapitän zur See.

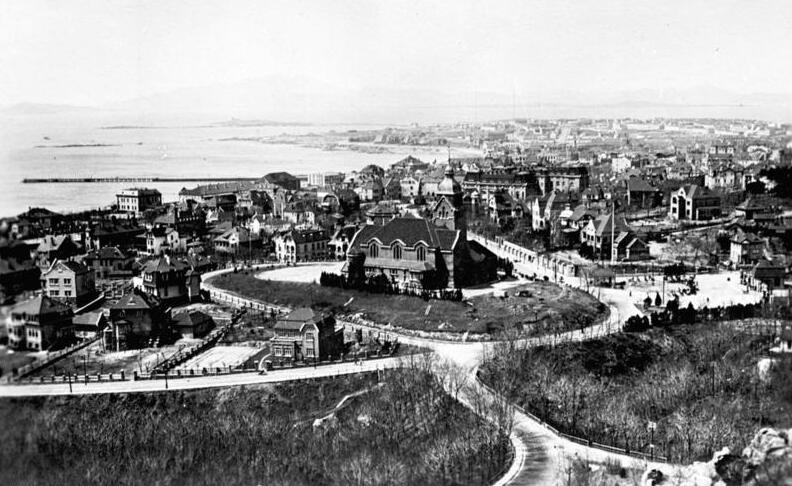
Overall view of Tsingtao, China, sometime between 1897 and 1914.

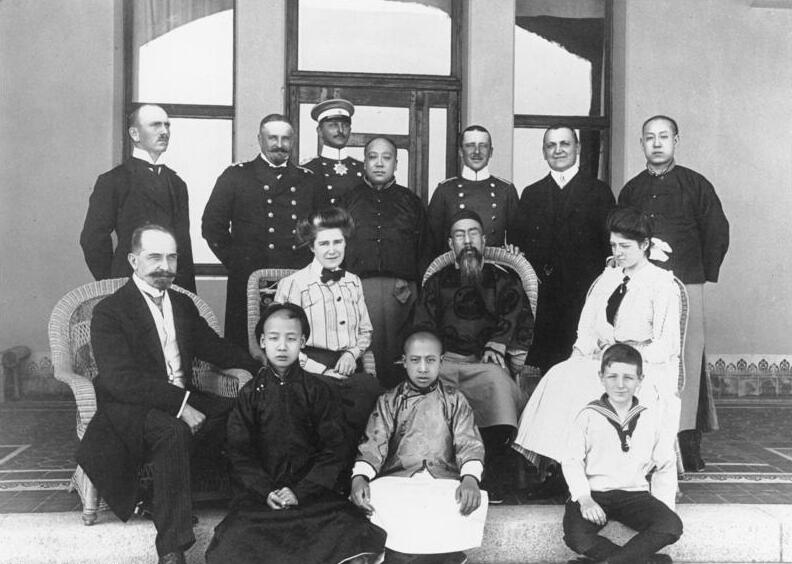
The visit of Governor Sun Pao-Chi to Tsingtao in April 1910. Meyer-Waldeck is standing second from left.

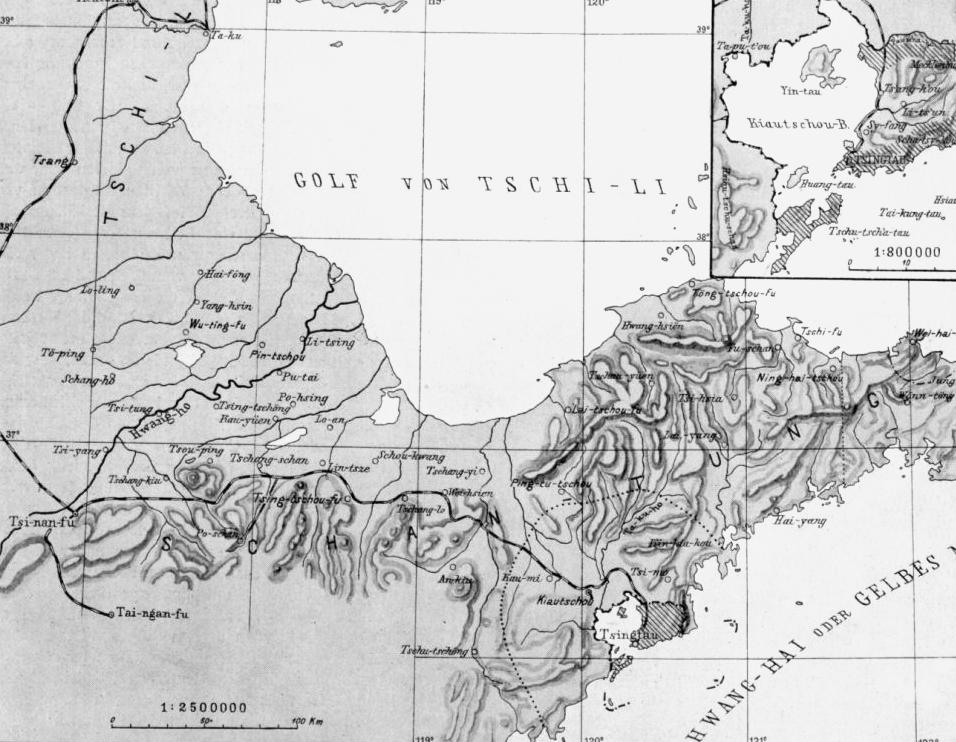
German 1912 map of the Shandong Peninsula showing the Jiaozhou Bay Leased Territory.

Alfred Meyer-Waldeck (27 November 1864 – 25 August 1928), born Alfred Meyer, was a vice admiral in the Imperial German Navy. He was the final governor of the Kiautschou Bay Leased Territory from 1911 to 1914 and was most notable as the German naval commander in the Siege of Tsingtao during World War I.

== Biography ==
=== Early life ===
Meyer-Waldeck was born Alfred Meyer in Saint Petersburg in the Russian Empire on 27 November 1864, the eighth of ten children of Friedrich Meyer and Dorothea von Boursy. His father was a professor of German literature and the editor of the German-language newspaper St. Petersburgische Zeitung. The family moved to Heidelberg in the German Empire in 1874, where Friedrich Meyer, who as an author used the surname "Meyer von Waldeck," was a professor at Heidelberg University. Alfred attended Gymnasium in Bonn and Heidelberg, and finished his secondary schooling when he took the Abitur in 1883. He then studied for two semesters at Heidelberg University.

=== Career ===
Alfred Meyer left Heidelberg University, entered the Imperial German Navy as a cadet on 21 April 1884, and completed his basic training on the sailing frigate SMS Niobe. He made two voyages to the West Indies. He attended the Naval School from 26 September 1884 to 14 April 1885 and then served aboard the corvette SMS Moltke until 18 April 1887. He was appointed Seekadett (midshipman) on 16 April 1885, just after reporting aboard Moltke, and was promoted to Unterleutnant zur See two years later . He then served aboard the ironclad frigate SMS König Wilhelm until 7 October 1887. He attended the Naval School again from 8 October 1887 to 14 September 1888 and then served as a watch officer, first on Moltke until 30 April 1889 and then on Niobe until 28 September 1889. He then transferred to the 1st Naval Artillery Department as a company officer, serving there until 30 September 1890. He next served as a watch officer on the ironclad SMS Kaiser until 6 April 1891 and was promoted to Leutnant zur See on 15 December 1890 while aboard Kaiser.

From 7 April to 30 September 1891, Meyer served as watch and training officer on the brig SMS Musquito. He was then a company officer in the cabin boys' department and served as a watch officer on the training ship SMS Gneisenau from 1 April 1892 to 12 January 1893. Meyer then was assigned to the aviso SMS Wacht as first officer. From 1 April 1893 to 31 March 1895 he served at the German Imperial Naval High Command. He then transferred to the 1st Torpedo Department, in which he served as a company officer, guard officer, first officer, and torpedo boat commander. At the same time, he served as commander of the torpedo boat SMS D1 and flag lieutenant of the II Torpedo Boat Flotilla from 3 August to 21 September 1897. He was promoted to Kapitänleutnant on 12 April 1897. From 22 September 1897 to 31 May 1898, Meyer attended the I. Coetus at the German Imperial Naval Academy in Kiel. He was assigned to inspect the torpedo establishment for three months before he completed the II Coetus at the Naval Academy.

After successfully completing his studies, Meyer left for Panama, then a part of Colombia, on 1 May 1899 for duty as first officer on the unprotected cruiser SMS Geier. He reported aboard Geier while she was in the midst of an extensive tour of the west coast of the Americas. She visited Puerto San José, Guatemala, from 11 to 17 May 1899, meeting a British cruiser there, and the two ships settled financial disputes with the Guatemalan government. Geier then stopped at Corinto, Nicaragua; Guayaquil, Ecuador; and Puntarenas, Costa Rica. While at Corinto, she had received orders to proceed to the United States West Coast and British Columbia Coast in Canada. She stopped at Acapulco, Mexico, then arrived on 14 August 1899 at San Francisco, California, where she underwent a boiler overhaul. On 18 September 1899, she departed San Francisco, and after a stop at Esquimalt, British Columbia, arrived at Vancouver. She left Vancouver on 18 October 1899 and headed south. She visited ports in Chile in January and February 1900, including Puerto Montt on 14 February 1900, before heading north, to take up duties as the German station ship on the newly created West American station.

The Boxer Rebellion broke out in Qing China in mid-October 1899, and while Geier was at Acapulco on 9 July 1900, she received orders to join the forces of the Eight Nation Alliance fighting the Boxers in China. She departed Acapulco on 11 July 1900 and after stops at Honolulu, Hawaii, and Yokohama, Japan, arrived in China at Yantai, known to the Western world as "Chefoo," on 29 August 1900, where she joined the ships of the German East Asia Squadron. Her first assignment was to patrol the Bohai Sea before docking in Tsingtao (now Qingdao) in the German-held Kiautschou (now Jiaozhou) Bay Leased Territory in October 1900. On 28 October 1900, she steamed to Shanghai, where she remained until February 1901. Geier then steamed up the Yangtze to Chungking (now Chongqing), where she replaced her sister ship SMS Bussard. On 5 April 1901, Geier returned to Tsingtao, and on 29 April 1901 she was transferred to the coast of central China, where she replaced her sister ship SMS Seeadler.

Meyer detached from Geier around that time. After returning to Germany on 26 June 1901, he was first officer on the survey ship Hyäne. He then served as first officer on the coastal defense ship SMS Hagen for two months before transferring to the German Imperial Admiralty Staff, where he had duty until 28 January 1905. While on the Admiralty Staff, he was promoted to Korvettenkapitän on 28 March 1903. In April 1903, he received approval to use the surname Meyer-Waldeck from the regional director of the Principality of Waldeck and Pyrmont. Thereafter he was known as Alfred Meyer-Waldeck.

After leaving the Admiralty Staff, Meyer-Waldeck spent six months in 1905 as first officer on the battleship SMS Wettin. From the autumn of 1905 until the summer of 1908 he was member of the admiral′s staff of the I Battle Squadron aboard the squadron's flagship, the battleship SMS Wittelsbach. During this duty he was promoted to Fregattenkapitän in 1907.

On 24 June 1908, Meyer-Waldeck was appointed chief of staff at Tsingtao, where he arrived on 24 December 1908. Promoted to Kapitän zur See on 27 January 1909, he had additional duty in Tsingtao as deputy-governor of the Kiautschou Bay Leased Territory from 6 April 1909 until 2 April 1910, during which time the territory′s governor, Oskar von Troppel, was in Germany. Meyer-Waldeck returned to Germany on 22 February 1911 by train via Siberia. Troppel left the governorship on 14 May 1911, leaving his chief of staff, Kapitän zur See Wilhelm Höpfner, to serve as acting governor pending the arrival of a new governor. A few months after returning to Germany, Meyer-Waldeck was appointed Troppel's successor as governor on 19 August 1911, and he arrived in Tsingtao to take over his duties from Höpfner on 22 November 1911.

The German Empire entered World War I in early August 1914, and the Empire of Japan joined the war by declaring war on Germany on 23 August 1914. Japanese and British forces began an assault on Tsingtao on 27 August 1914, and Meyer-Waldeck telegraphed Emperor Wilhelm II that he would "stand up for the fulfillment of duty to the utmost." During the ensuing Siege of Tsingtao, German forces under Meyer-Waldeck held out until 7 November 1914, when Meyer-Waldeck had to capitulate to the Allied forces after the German defenders used up most of their artillery ammunition.

After the surrender, Meyer-Waldeck became a prisoner-of-war in Japan. He was taken first to a prisoner-of-war camp at Fukuoka, moving to a camp at Narashino in 1918. He later wrote about his time as a prisoner-of-war, saying that conditions were inhumane that POWs “were subjected to the arbitrariness of subordinate authorities in various camps for five long years. Only the German newspapers knew how to talk about 'chivalrous treatment'."

World War I ended on 11 November 1918. Not released from enemy captivity until the end of December 1919, Meyer-Waldeck participated in the dissolution of the camps and associated handover formalities during early 1920, and by an order of 30 January 1920 he was retroactively promoted to Konteradmiral, backdated to 22 March 1915, and Vizeadmiral, backdated to 27 January 1918. With his duties in Japan complete, he left Japan on 25 March 1920 on the steamer Nankai Maru. Upon arrival in Germany he was placed "at the disposal," a German military term of the time for temporary retirement. He permanently retired when he was released from active duty on 31 August 1920.

=== Later life ===
In retirement, Meyer-Waldeck lived in Berlin. Although he remained an unreserved supporter of colonialism and of the restoration of the German colonial empire, he stayed away from politics for the rest of his life. Because of ill health he visited the spa at Bad Kissingen in the summer of 1928, where he died on 25 August 1928. He was buried at Heidelberg in a family plot.

== Personal life ==
In Kiel in 1898, Meyer married Johanna Ney (31 December 1880 – 20 August 1964), who came from Charlottenburg. The couple had a son — Hans, who was born in Charlottenburg on 23 July 1902 and died in 1965 — and two daughters, Hertha, who lived from 1906 to 1919, and Dagmar, who was born at Kiel on 25 June 1908 and died in 2005.

== Honors and awards ==
- Order of the Red Eagle 3rd Class (Kingdom of Prussia)
- Order of the Crown 2nd Class (Kingdom of Prussia)
- Service Award Cross (Kingdom of Prussia)
- Commander 1st Class of the Order of Henry the Lion (Duchy of Brunswick)
- Commander 1st Class of the Order of the Double Dragon of the Second Degree 1st Class (Qing Dynasty)
- Order of the Precious Brilliant Golden Grain (Republic of China)
- Grand Cross of the Order of Franz Joseph (Austria-Hungary)
- Order of Saint Anna 3rd Class (Russian Empire)
- Order of Saint Stanislaus 2nd Class (Russian Empire)
