= Lynden-Bell =

Lynden-Bell may refer to:

== People ==
- Arthur Lynden-Bell (1867–1943), British Army officer
- Donald Lynden-Bell (1935–2018), British astrophysicist
- Ruth Lynden-Bell (born 1937), British chemist

== Others ==
- 18235 Lynden-Bell, main-belt asteroid, named after Donald Lynden-Bell
