= Mitsuomi =

- Gender: Male

Origin
- Origin: Japanese
- Meaning: Different meanings depending on the kanji used

Mitsuomi (written: 光臣) is a masculine Japanese given name. Notable people with the name include:

- Mitsuomi Kamio (神尾 光臣; 1856–1927), Japanese imperial army general
- Mitsuomi Takahashi (高橋 光臣; born 1982), Japanese actor

== Fictional characters ==
- Mitsuomi Takayanagi (高柳 光臣), character in the manga series Tenjho Tenge
