= Arthur Lynden-Bell =

British Army general (1867–1943)

Major-General Sir Arthur Lynden-Bell KCB KCMG DL JP
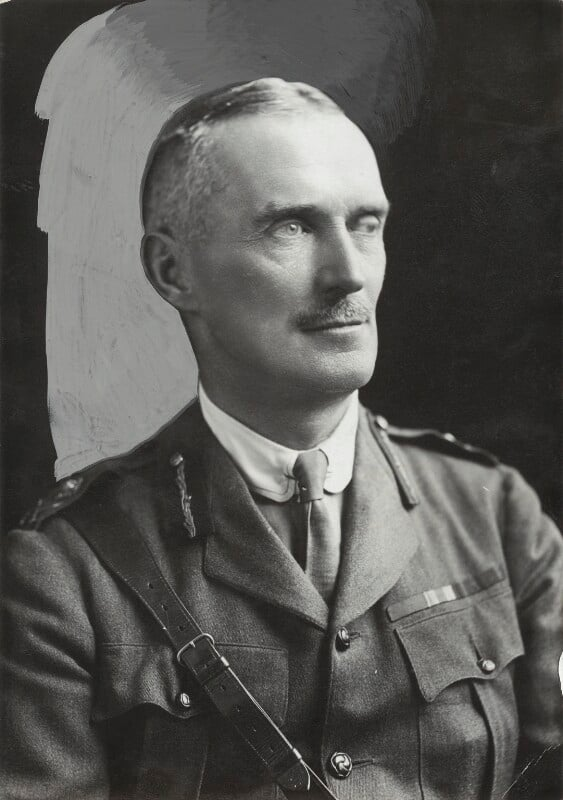
- Lynden-Bell in 1929
- Born: 2 January 1867; Carlisle, Cumberland, England
- Died: 14 February 1943 (aged 76); Platt, Kent, England
- Military career
- Branch: British Army
- Service years: 1885–1924
- Rank: Major-General
- Unit: Buffs (Royal East Kent Regiment)
- Conflicts: Second Boer War; First World War
- Awards: Knight Commander of the Order of the Bath; Knight Commander of the Order of St Michael and St George; Mentioned in Dispatches; Army Distinguished Service Medal (United States)

Major-General Sir Arthur Lynden Lynden-Bell KCB KCMG DL JP (2 January 1867 – 14 February 1943) was a British Army officer.

== Early life ==
Lynden-Bell was the son of Major-General Thomas Lynden Lynden-Bell and younger brother of Colonel Charles Perceval Lynden-Bell. He was educated at Clifton College.

== Military career ==
He attended the Royal Military College, Sandhurst and commissioned as a Lieutenant into the Buffs (Royal East Kent Regiment) in May 1885.

After promotion to captain on 31 January 1894, he served the following year on the North West Frontier of British India and returned to Britain where he attended the Staff College, Camberley, from 1898 to 1899.

Soon afterwards, he saw active service in the Second Boer War, commanding a mounted infantry contingent of the Buffs. He was wounded, and returned home on the SS Greek in March 1900.

In May 1900, he became a Staff Captain for intelligence in the War Office, and the following year he was made Deputy-Assistant Quartermaster-General for intelligence at the War Office on 20 July 1901. He was promoted to major on 3 May 1902, and appointed a Companion of the Order of St Michael and St George (CMG) in 1905. In January 1907 he succeeded Hugh Bruce Williams as a deputy assistant adjutant general. Later that year, Lynden-Bell became a general staff officer, grade 2 of Southern Command. In July 1908 he was appointed as a lieutenant colonel.

He relinquished this assignment in April 1911 and was then placed on half-pay. This lasted until October when, reverting to normal pay, he became a general staff officer, grade 2 of the Lowland Division (later the 52nd (Lowland) Infantry Division). He was promoted to colonel while serving in this position, dated to March 1912. On 19 February 1914 he was appointed as a GSO1 at the War Office, taking over from Nathaniel Barnardiston.

At the start of the World War I Lynden-Bell was, in February 1915, promoted to temporary brigadier general and succeeded Major General George Milne as brigadier general, general staff of III Corps. For his wartime leadership, he was appointed a Companion of the Order of the Bath (CB) in the 1915 Birthday Honours. In July he was promoted again, now to temporary major general, and became major general, general staff of the newly created Third Army. He was later the assistant quartermaster general of the British Expeditionary Force. In 1915 he served as Chief of General Staff of the Mediterranean and Egypt Expeditionary Force, and saw service in the Gallipoli campaign, being Mentioned in dispatches and promoted to substantive major general on 1 January 1916. In 1916-1917 he was the Chief-of-Staff of the Egyptian Expeditionary Force under General Sir Archibald Murray, but was removed from the post and returned home in mid-1917 soon after the arrival of Edmund Allenby in Cairo to replace Murray.

Lynden-Bell was appointed a Commander of the Legion of Honour in 1917. In 1918 he was Director of Staff Duties at the War Office.

He retired from the regular army in 1924, and in December 1928 became colonel of the Buffs in succession to General Sir Arthur Paget serving in the position until 1 January 1937.

== Later years ==
In retirement, he served as a Deputy Lieutenant and as a Justice of the Peace and was a "very keen supporter" of Kent County Cricket Club, always attending Canterbury Cricket Week in the Buff's tent at the St Lawrence Ground.

== Death ==
Lynden-Bell died at Platt near Sevenoaks in Kent in 1943, aged 76.

== Personal life ==
He married the Hon. Bertha Marion Akers-Douglas, daughter of Aretas Akers-Douglas, 1st Viscount Chilston and Adeline Mary Austen-Smith, on 2 June 1905.

== Cultural references ==
He appears in the war memoir Seven Pillars of Wisdom by T. E. Lawrence.
