= Siege of Tsingtao =

Operation during World War I

- Part of the Asian and Pacific theatre of World War I
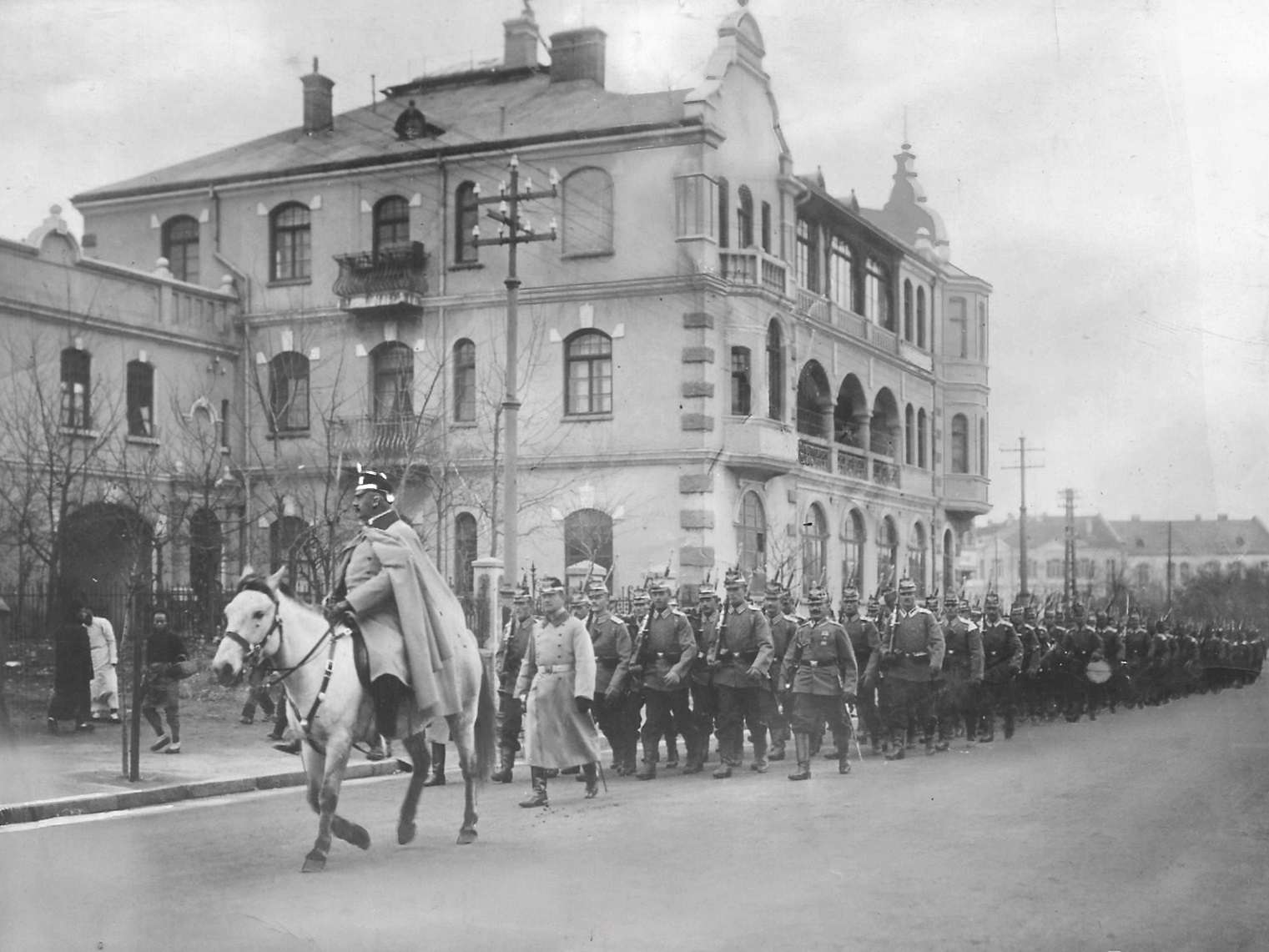
- German forces during the siege, November 1914
Date	August 27 – November 7, 1914 (2 months, 1 week and 4 days)
Location	Qingdao (Tsingtao), Kiautschou Bay Leased Territory 36°4′N 120°23′E
Result	Anglo–Japanese victory
Territorial changes	Japanese occupation of Qingdao and the Qingdao–Jinan railway

Belligerents
Japan: United Kingdom; Weihaiwei; New Zealand; India; Naval support: France	Germany; Kiautschou Bay; Austria-Hungary

Commanders and leaders
(Empire of Japan) Mitsuomi Kamio; (Empire of Japan) Sadakichi Kato; (United Kingdom of Great Britain and Ireland) Nathaniel Barnardiston	(German Empire) Alfred Waldeck (surrendered)

Strength
24,500; 1 seaplane carrier; 5 battleships; 2 battlecruisers; 1 protected cruiser; 2 destroyers; 2 airplanes	3,750; 1 protected cruiser; 1 unprotected cruiser; 1 torpedo boat; 4 gunboats; 2 airplanes

Casualties and losses
727 killed; 1,335 wounded; 1 protected cruiser sunk; 1 destroyer sunk; 1 battleship damaged; 1 airplane destroyed	199 killed; 504 wounded; 3,047 captured; 1 protected cruiser scuttled; 1 unprotected cruiser scuttled; 1 torpedo boat scuttled; 4 gunboats scuttled
- 98 Chinese civilians killed and 30 wounded by Japanese forces

The Siege of Tsingtao (German: Belagerung von Tsingtau; Japanese: 青島の戦い; simplified Chinese: 青岛战役; traditional Chinese: 青島戰役) was the attack on the German port of Qingdao (Tsingtao) from Jiaozhou Bay during World War I by Japan and the United Kingdom. The siege was waged against Imperial Germany between 27 August and 7 November 1914. The siege was the first encounter between Japanese and German forces, the first Anglo-Japanese operation of the war, and the only major land battle in the Asian and Pacific theatre during World War I.

== Background ==
Throughout the late 19th and early 20th centuries, Germany joined other European powers in a scramble for colonial possessions such as the Scramble for Africa and the Scramble for China. As with the other world powers (including the United States and Japan), Germany began to interfere in Chinese local affairs. After two German missionaries were killed in the Juye Incident in 1897, China was forced to agree to the Jiaozhou Bay Leased Territory in Shandong to Germany in 1898 on a 99-year lease. Germany then began to assert its influence across the rest of the province and built the city and port of Qingdao, which became the base of the German East Asia Squadron of the Kaiserliche Marine (Imperial Navy), which operated in support of the German colonies in the Pacific. Britain viewed the German presence in China with suspicion and leased Weihaiwei, also in Shandong, as a naval port and coaling station. Russia leased its own station at Port Arthur (now Lüshunkou) and France at Kouang-Tchéou-Wan. Britain also began to forge close ties with Japan, and diplomatic relations became warmer, with the Anglo-Japanese Alliance being signed on 30 January 1902. Japan saw the alliance as a necessary deterrent to its main rival, Russia. Japan demonstrated its potential by its victory in the 1905 Russo-Japanese War; the alliance continued into World War I.

When the war in Europe began in August 1914, Britain promptly requested Japanese assistance. On 15 August, Japan issued an ultimatum, stating that Germany must withdraw her warships from Chinese and Japanese waters and transfer control of its port of Qingdao to Japan. The next day, Major-General Mitsuomi Kamio, General Officer Commanding (GOC), 18th Infantry Division, was ordered to prepare to take Qingdao by force. The ultimatum expired on 23 August, and Japan declared war on Germany. At the beginning of hostilities in Europe, the ships of the East Asia Squadron under Vice Admiral Maximilian von Spee were dispersed at various Pacific colonies on routine missions. Spee's ships rendezvoused in the Northern Mariana Islands for coaling. SMS Emden then headed for the Indian Ocean, while the rest of the squadron made their way to the west coast of South America. The squadron engaged and destroyed two cruisers of a Royal Navy squadron at the Battle of Coronel, before itself being destroyed at the Battle of the Falkland Islands in the South Atlantic.

== German defences ==
The Boxer Rebellion, at the beginning of the century, had led Germany to consider the defence of Qingdao. The port and the town were divided from the rest of the peninsula by steep hills. The main line of defence lay along three hills, Mount Moltke, Mount Bismarck, and Mount Iltis, from the Kaiserstuhl to Litsuner Heights. Guarding the left wing was Fort Moltke, on the hill of the same name, with two 9.4 in. (240 mm) guns. The heaviest firepower was concentrated in the four 11 in. (280 mm) howitzers of Fort Bismarck. On the right wing, Fort Iltis contained two 9.4 in. guns at the hill's summit. A second 17 km (11 mi) line of defence was set up along a closer line of steep hills. The final line of defence was along hills 200 m (660 ft) above the town. A network of trenches, batteries, and other fortifications had been built in preparation for the coming siege. Germany had strengthened the defences from the sea by laying mines in the approaches to the harbour and building four batteries and five redoubts. The fortifications were well equipped (though some with obsolete Chinese artillery) and were well manned.

== Prelude ==
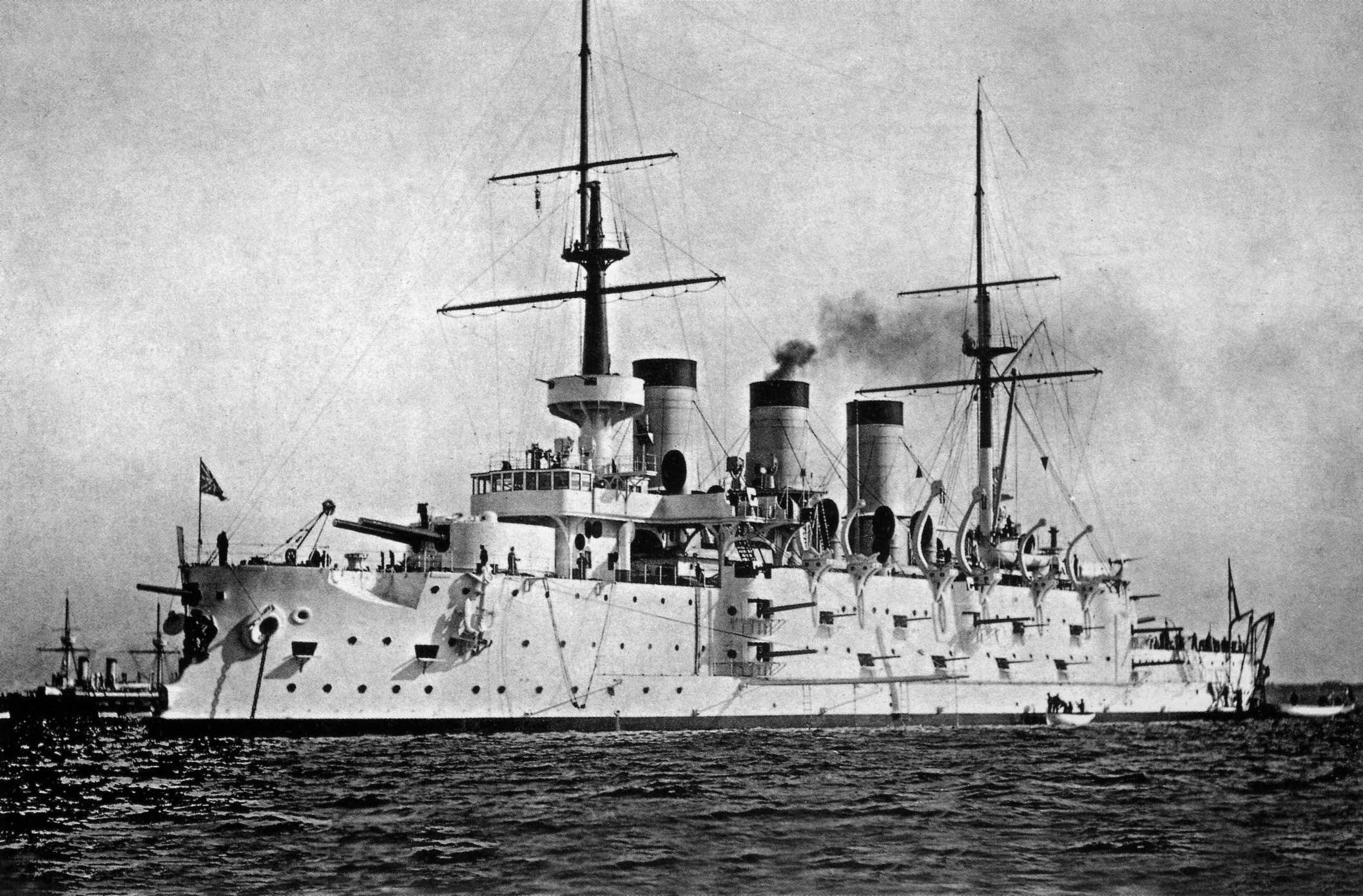
Suwo was the flagship of the Japanese expeditionary fleet during the siege of Tsingtao.

On 27 August the Imperial Japanese Navy (IJN) sent ships under Vice-Admiral Sadakichi Kato, flying his flag in the pre-dreadnought battleship Suwo, to blockade the coast of Jiaozhou. The British Royal Navy (RN) strengthened the Japanese fleet by sending the China Station's pre-dreadnought HMS Triumph and the destroyer HMS Usk. The French Navy contributed with the cruiser Dupleix, who left the area when Japan assumed responsibility of the blockade on 9 September. On 14 October, the Triumph was slightly damaged by a German shore battery, killing one member of its crew and injuring two others. The blockading fleet consisted mainly of nearly obsolete warships, though it did at times include a few modern vessels. These included the dreadnoughts Kawachi, Settsu, the battlecruiser Kongō, her sister Hiei, and the seaplane carrier Wakamiya, whose airplanes became the first of its kind in the world to attack sea and land targets. These Japanese airplanes would also take part in another military first, a night-time bombing raid.

The 18th Infantry Division was the primary Japanese Army formation that took part in the initial landings, numbering some 23,000 soldiers with support from 142 artillery pieces. They began to land on 2 September at Lungkow, which was experiencing heavy floods at the time, and later at Lau Schan Bay on 18 September, about 29 km (18 mi) east of Qingdao. China protested against the Japanese violation of her neutrality but did not interfere in the operations.

The British Government and the other European great powers were concerned about Japanese intentions in the region and decided to send a small symbolic British contingent from Tientsin in an effort to allay their fears. The 1,500-man contingent was commanded by Brigadier-General Nathaniel Walter Barnardiston and consisted of 1,000 soldiers of the 2nd Battalion, The South Wales Borderers; later followed by 500 soldiers of the 36th Sikhs. Following a friendly fire incident, British troops were given Japanese raincoats to wear so they would be more easily identifiable to the Japanese.

The Germans responded to the threat against Qingdao by concentrating all of their available East Asian troops in the city. Kaiser Wilhelm II made the defence of Qingdao a top priority, saying that:

"...it would shame me more to surrender Tsingtao to the Japanese than Berlin to the Russians".

The German garrison, commanded by naval Captain and Governor Alfred Meyer-Waldeck, consisted of the marines of III Seebataillon, naval personnel, Chinese colonial troops, and Austro-Hungarian sailors, for a total strength of 3,625 men. He also had a modest complement of vessels, including the torpedo boat S90; the decommissioned unprotected cruiser Cormoran; the auxiliary cruiser Cormoran, which was the former captured Russian steamer Ryazan manned with the crew of cruiser Cormoran; four small gunboats: the Iltis, Jaguar, Tiger, and Luchs; (Note: The four gunboats of the East Asia Squadron that had been left at Qingdao were later scuttled by their crews just prior to the capture of the base by Japanese forces in November 1914.) and the Austro-Hungarian protected cruiser Kaiserin Elisabeth, (Note: The ship was scuttled after all ammunition had been fired.) whose crew was initially divided in two: half to man the ship, and half to fight with the German land forces.

On 22 August HMS Kennet of the China squadron, under the command of Lieutenant Commander F. A. Russell, while routinely monitoring the naval trade routes, encountered and was damaged in action by the German torpedo boat S90, the German gunboat SMS Lauting and a 4-inch shore battery off Qingdao. She was hit twice from the retreating S90.

== Siege ==
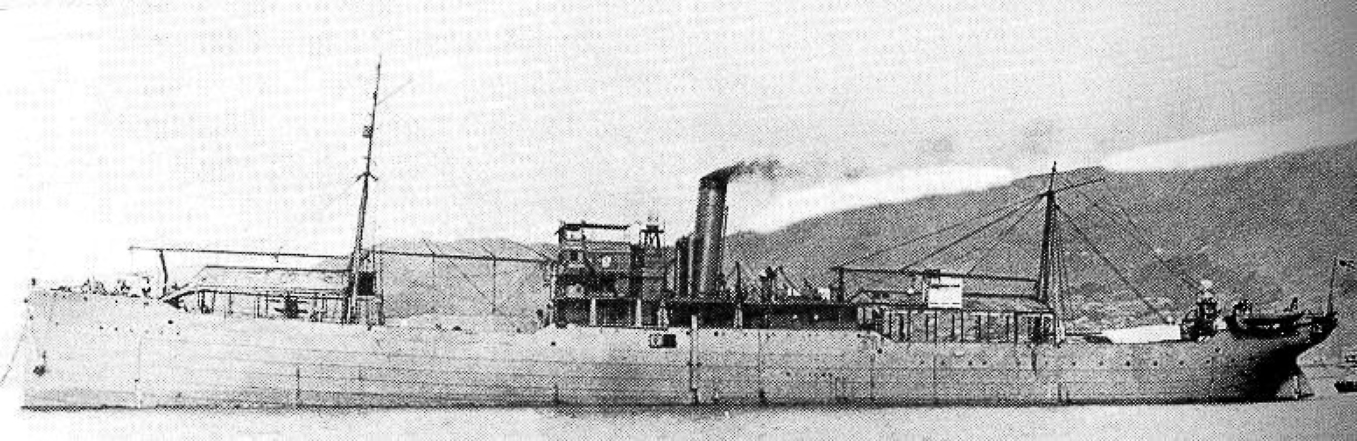
The Japanese seaplane carrier Wakamiya conducted the world's first naval-launched air raids in September 1914 against German positions in Qingdao.

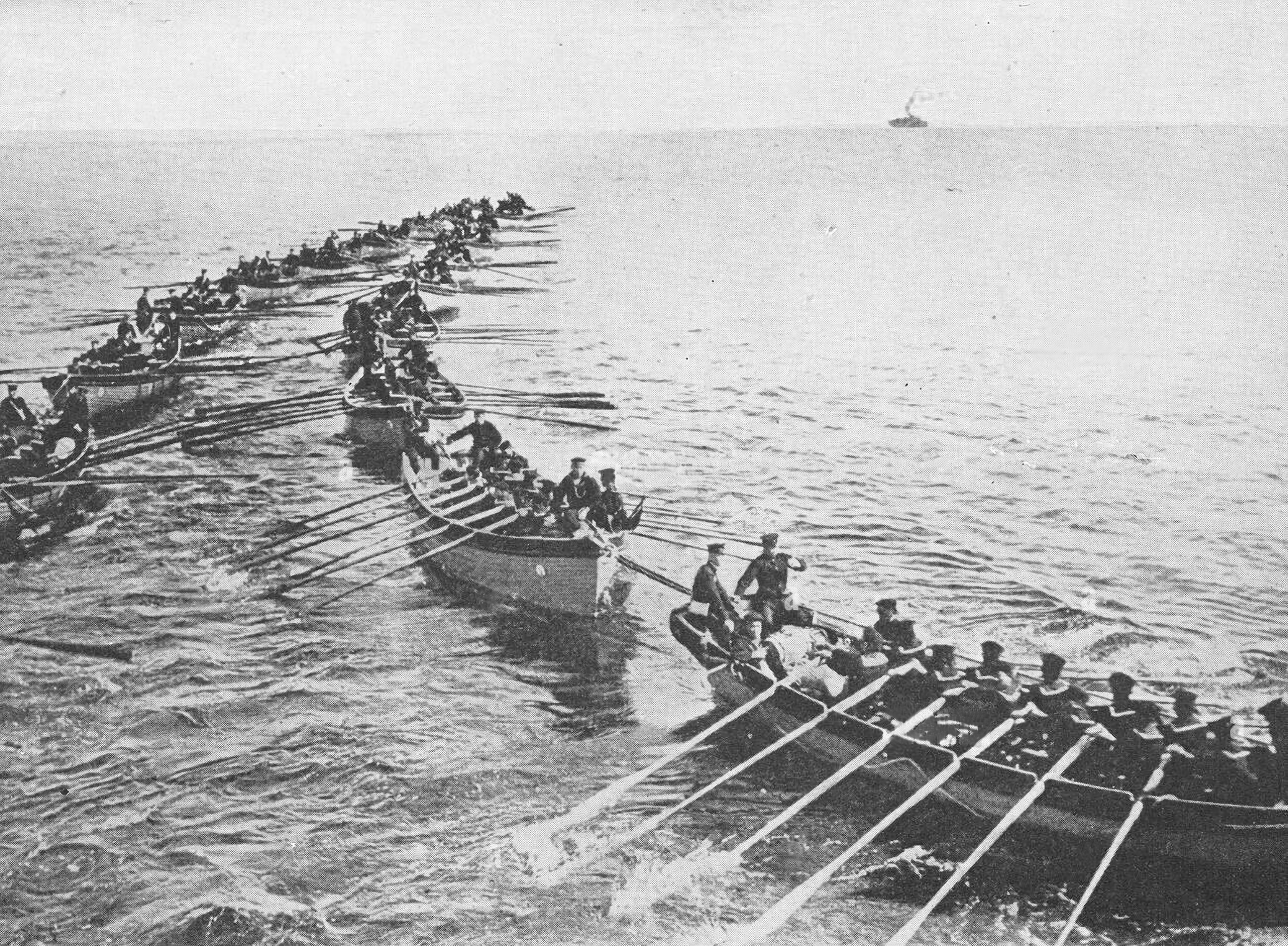
Japanese troops coming ashore near Qingdao

As the Japanese approached their positions, Meyer-Waldeck withdrew his forces from the two outer defensive lines and concentrated his troops on the innermost line of defence along the hills closest to the town. The Austro-Hungarian cruiser SMS Kaiserin Elisabeth was stationed in Qingdao at the start of the war. On 2 September 1914 the German gunboat Jaguar sank the stranded Japanese destroyer Shirotae. On 5 September a Japanese reconnaissance airplane scouted the port and reported that the Asian German fleet had departed, the Japanese ordered the dreadnought, pre-dreadnought, and cruiser to leave the blockade. The next day the second air-sea battle in history took place (the first air-sea battle in history was at the Balkan wars in 1913) when a Farman seaplane launched by the Wakamiya unsuccessfully attacked the Kaiserin Elisabeth and the Jaguar in Qiaozhou Bay with bombs. Early in the siege, the Kaiserin Elisabeth and German gunboat Jaguar made an unsuccessful sortie against Japanese vessels blockading Qingdao. Later, the cruiser's 15‑cm and 4.7‑cm guns were removed from the ship and mounted onshore, creating the Batterie Elisabeth. The ship's crew took part in the defence of Qingdao. On 13 September the Japanese land forces launched a cavalry raid on the German rear guard at Jimo, which the Germans gave up and retreated from. Subsequently, the Japanese took control of Jiaozhou and the Shandong railway. Lt. Gen. Kamio considered this the point of no return for his land forces and as the weather became extremely harsh he took no risk and fortified the troops at the town, returned the reinforcements that were on the way, re-embarked and landed at Lau Schan Bay.

On 26 September, Kamio resumed his advance, and the Germans were forced to retreat beyond the river Litsun. The Japanese made good time, crossing the river Paisha early in the day, swiftly crossing the seven-mile lowland plain and reaching the northern bank of the Litsun.

On 27 September, Kamio tried to take Prince Heinrich Hill by a frontal assault and was caught in a murderous crossfire. From the summit, the Germans rained down bullets from four Maxim guns. Out in the harbour, Kaiserin Elisabeth and Leopard shelled the exposed slopes, nearly routing the Japanese right flank. The Japanese assault was saved by the allied fleet. As the siege progressed, the naval vessels trapped in the harbour, Cormoran, Iltis and Luchs, were scuttled on 28 September. On 17 October, the torpedo boat S90 slipped out of Qingdao harbour and fired a torpedo which sank the Japanese cruiser Takachiho with the loss of 271 officers and men. S90 was unable to run the blockade back to Qingdao and was scuttled in Chinese waters when the ship ran low on fuel. Tiger was scuttled on 29 October, Kaiserin Elisabeth on 2 November, followed finally by Jaguar on 7 November, the day the fortress surrendered to the Japanese forces.

The Japanese started shelling the fort and the city on 31 October and began digging parallel lines of trenches, just as they had done at the siege of Port Arthur nine years earlier. Very large 11‑inch howitzers from land, in addition to the firing of the Japanese naval guns, brought the German defences under constant bombardment during the night, the Japanese moving their own trenches further forward under the cover of their artillery. The bombardment continued for seven days, employing around 100 siege guns with 1,200 shells each on the Japanese side. While the Germans were initially able to use the heavy guns of the port fortifications to bombard the landward positions of the Allies, they soon ran out of ammunition. When the artillery ran out of ammunition on 6 November, surrender was inevitable.

The German garrison was able to field only a single Etrich Taube airplane during the siege flown by Lieutenant Gunther Plüschow. (A second Etrich Taube piloted by Lt. Friedrich Müllerskowsky crashed early in the campaign.) That airplane was used for frequent reconnaissance flights and Plüschow made several nuisance attacks on the blockading squadron dropping improvised munitions and other ordnance on them. Plüschow claimed the downing of a Japanese Farman MF.VII with his pistol, the first aerial victory in aviation history. Plüschow flew from Qingdao on 6 November 1914 carrying the governor's last dispatches, which were forwarded to Berlin through neutral diplomatic channels. (Note: Plüschow made his way home by August 1915 after a journey lasting nine months via Shanghai, San Francisco, New York, Gibraltar (where he was captured), London (where he escaped from a prisoner of war camp into the neutral Netherlands) and finally to Germany. He continued flying with the naval air service reaching the rank of Kapitänleutnant (Lieutenant Commander) by the end of the war. He then became a well-known explorer and died in a 1931 crash in Patagonia, Argentina.)

On the night of 6 November, waves of Japanese infantry attacked the third line of defence and overwhelmed the defenders. The next morning, the German forces, along with their Austro-Hungarian allies, asked for terms. The Allies took formal possession of the colony on 16 November 1914.

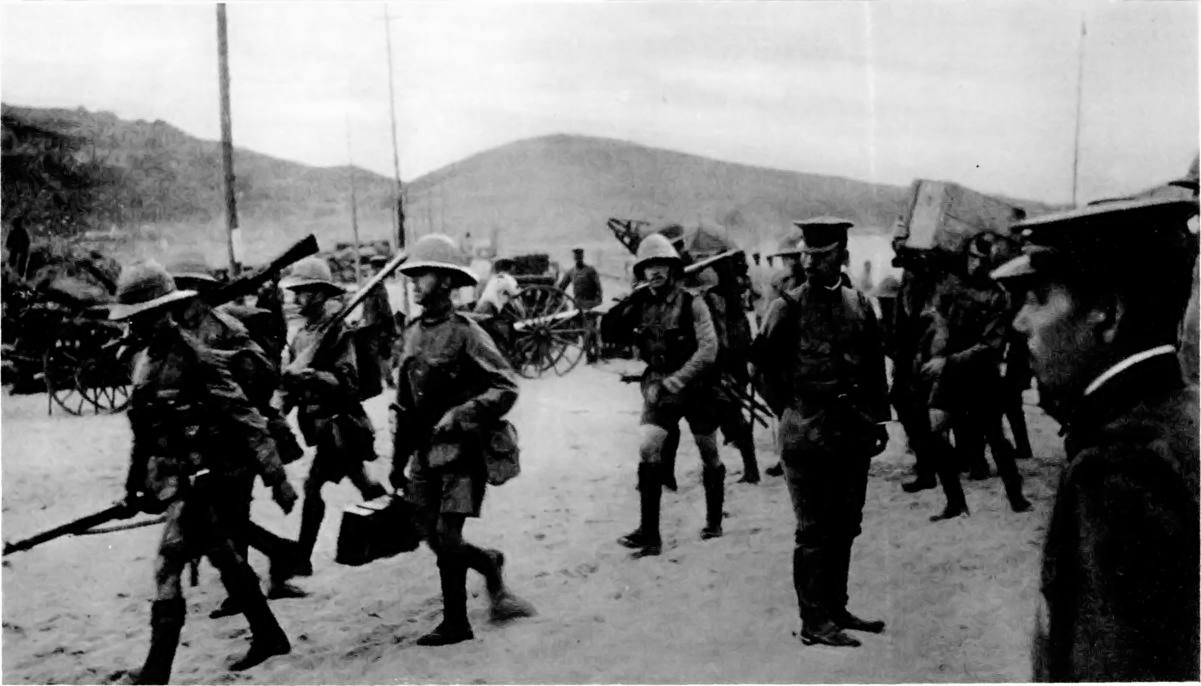
British troops arriving at Qingdao in 1914

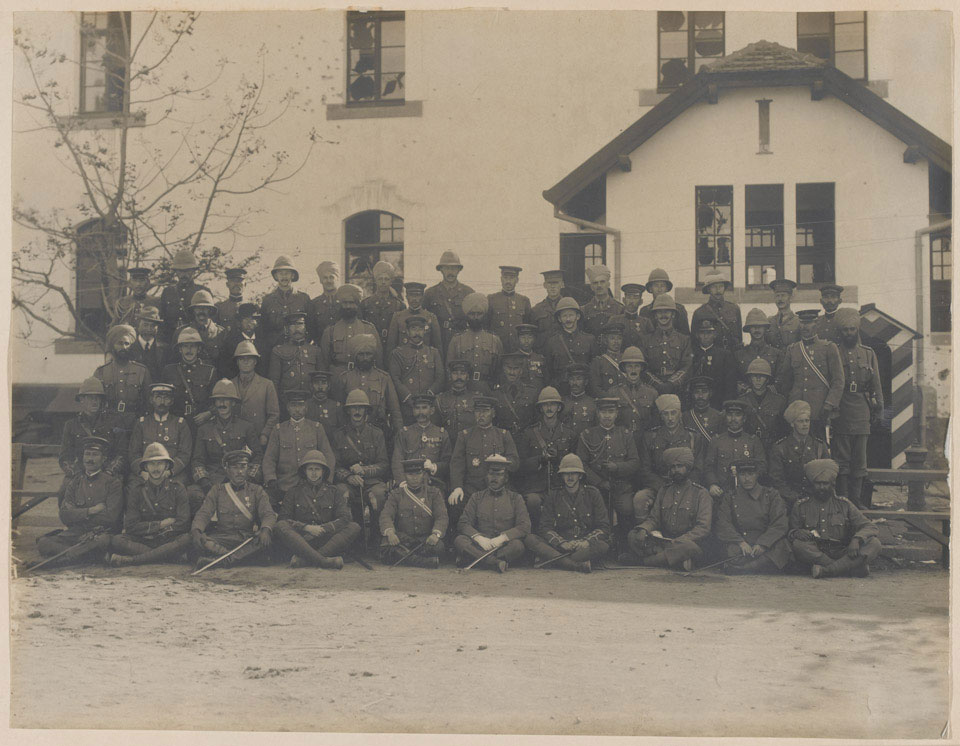
British, Indian and Japanese soldiers in Qingdao, 1914.

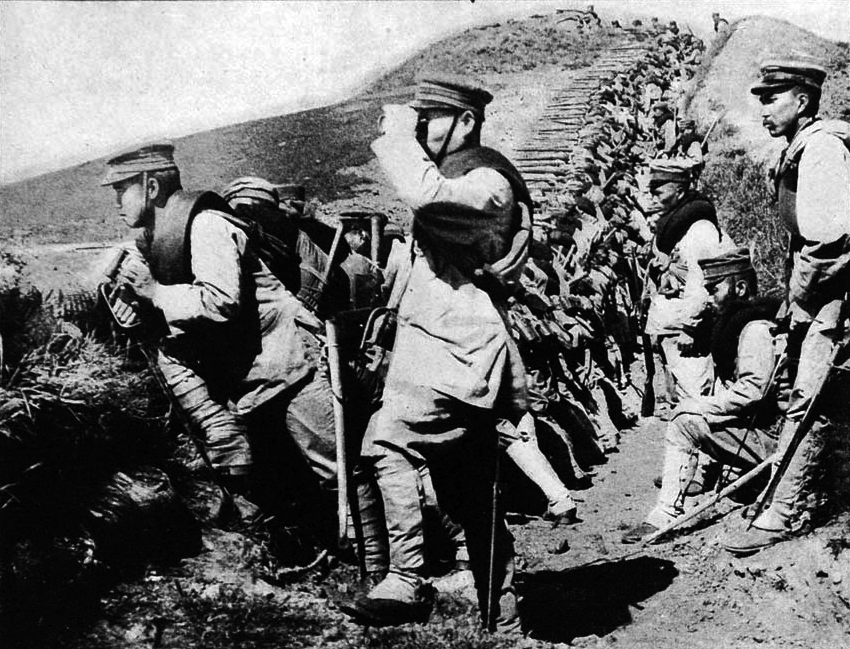
Soldiers of the 18th division, Imperial Japanese Army occupy an abandoned German trench during the Siege of Tsingtao, 1914

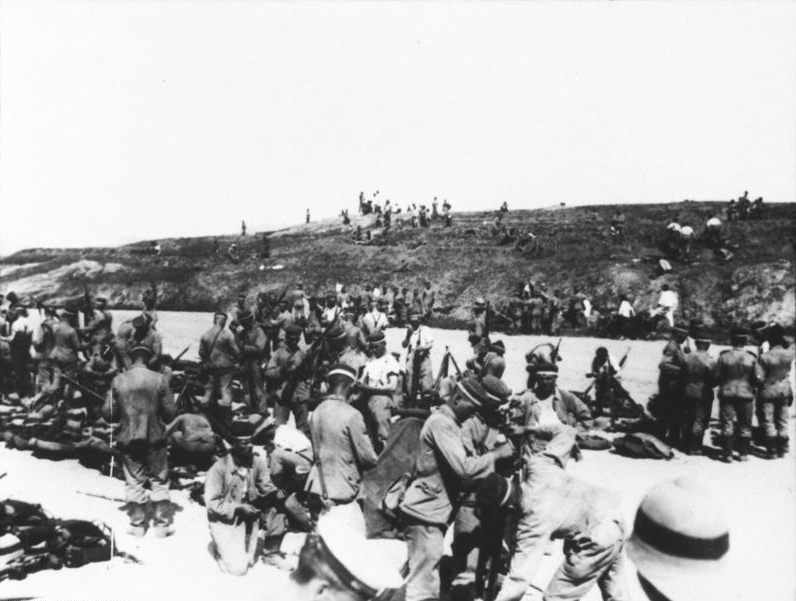
German front line at Qingdao 1914; the head cover identifies these men as members of III Seebataillon (III Sea Battalion) of Marines.

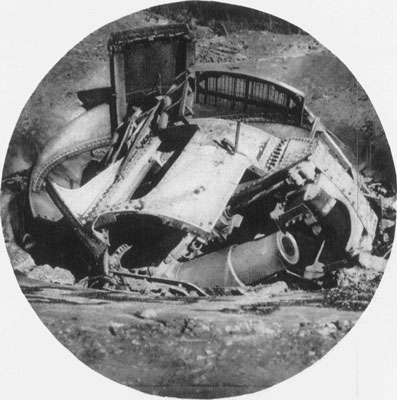
German gun in the Bismarck Fortress, Qingdao, crumpled by Japanese naval bombardment.

== Aftermath ==
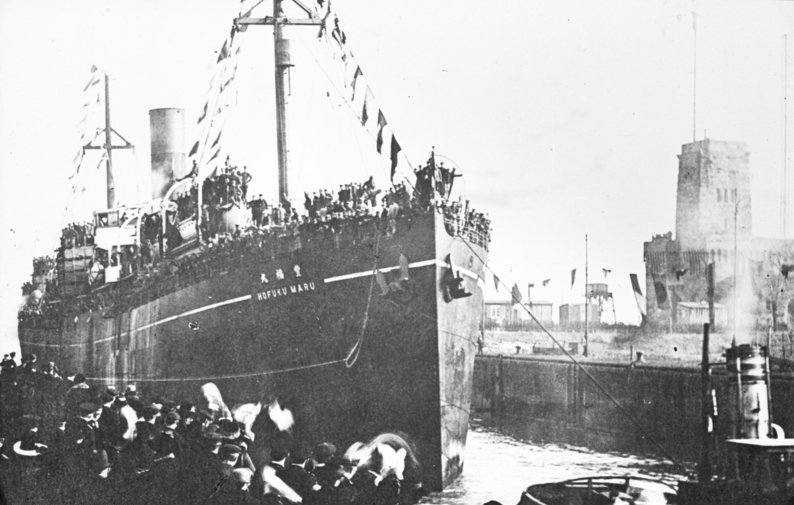
German POWs returning to Wilhelmshaven, Germany from Japan in February 1920

Though the German garrison was able to hold out for nearly two months despite the naval blockade with sustained artillery bombardment and being outnumbered 6 to 1, the defeat nevertheless temporarily served as a morale booster. The German defenders watched the Japanese with curiosity as they marched into Qingdao but turned their backs on the British when they entered into town. So deep was their anger that some German officers spat in the faces of their British counterparts.

Japanese casualties numbered 733 killed and 1,282 wounded; the British had 12 killed and 53 wounded. The German defenders lost 199 dead and 504 wounded. The German dead were buried at Qingdao, while the remaining soldiers were transported to prisoner of war camps in Japan.

Admiral Alfred Meyer-Waldeck later accused the Japanese military of holding German and Austro-Hungarian POWs in inhumane conditions. The Admiral later alleged that POWs held in Japanese custody "were subjected to the arbitrariness of subordinate authorities in various camps for five long years. Only the German newspapers knew how to talk about 'chivalrous treatment'."

The German troops were interned in Japan until the formal signature of the Versailles peace treaty in 1919, but due to technical questions, the troops were not repatriated before 1920. 170 prisoners chose to remain in Japan after the end of the war.

The British troops of the 2nd Battalion South Wales Borderers were embarked aboard the P&O vessel Delta on 18 November 1914. They were disembarked at Avonmouth on 12 January 1915, and moved to Warwickshire on 15 January 1915, to join other battalions, returning from overseas garrison peacetime duties, to form the 29th Division (United Kingdom), that disembarked at Gallipoli on 25 April 1915.

During the course of the campaign, Japanese forces and individuals killed 98 civilians and wounded 28, as well as raping "a certain number" of women. These figures were collected by the Chinese government in the aftermath of the battle as it sought to claim war loss reparations from Japan at the Paris Peace Conference.

== See also ==
- Blutmai
- Burning of Cork
- Destruction of Kalisz
- Japan during World War I
- Lwów pogrom (1914)
- Sack of Louvain
- U-boat campaign
- Japanese landing at Tsingtao, 10 January 1938

== Sources ==
- Corbett, Julian (1997) [1938]. Naval Operations to the Battle of the Falklands. History of the Great War: Based on Official Documents. Vol. I (2nd ed.). London; Nashville, Tennessee: Imperial War Museum in association with the Battery Press. ISBN 0-89839-256-X.
- Denis, Colin (2000). "Tsingtao campaign". Archived from the original on 3 May 2003.
- Donko, Wilhelm M. (2013). Österreichs Kriegsmarine in Fernost: Alle Fahrten von Schiffen der k.(u.)k. Kriegsmarine nach Ostasien, Australien und Ozeanien von 1820 bis 1914 (in German). Berlin: epubli. ISBN 978-3844249125.
- Edgerton, Robert B. (1999). Warriors of the Rising Sun: A history of the Japanese military. Basic books. ISBN 978-0813336008.
- Haupt, Werner (1984). Deutschlands Schutzgebiete in Übersee 1884–1918 [Germany's overseas protectorates 1884–1918]. Friedberg: Podzun-Pallas Verlag. ISBN 978-3790902044.
- Jordan, John & Caresse, Philippe (2019). French Armoured Cruisers 1887–1932. Barnsley, UK: Seaforth Publishing. ISBN 978-1-5267-4118-9.
- Radó, Antal, ed. (1919). "Csingtao eleste" [The fall of Tsingtao]. A világháború naplója [Diary of the World War] (in Hungarian). Vol. IV. Budapest, Hungary: Lampel R. könyvkiadó.
- Saxon, Timothy D. (2000). "Anglo-Japanese Naval cooperation, 1914–1918". Naval War College Review. 53 (1): 62–93.
- Schultz-Naumann, Joachim (1985). Unter Kaisers Flagge, Deutschlands Schutzgebiete im Pazifik und in China einst und heute [Under the Kaiser's Flag, Germany's protectorates in the Pacific and in China then and today]. Munich: Universitas. ISBN 978-3800410941.
- Veperdi, András. "The protected cruiser SMS Kaiserin Elisabeth in defence of Tsingtao in 1914". mateinfo.hu. Budapest, Hungary: Hungarian seamen's association.
- Willmott, H.P. (2003). First World War (1st ed.). Dorling Kindersley. ISBN 978-1405300292.
