= Japanese seaplane carrier Wakamiya =

Seaplane carrier of the Imperial Japanese Navy

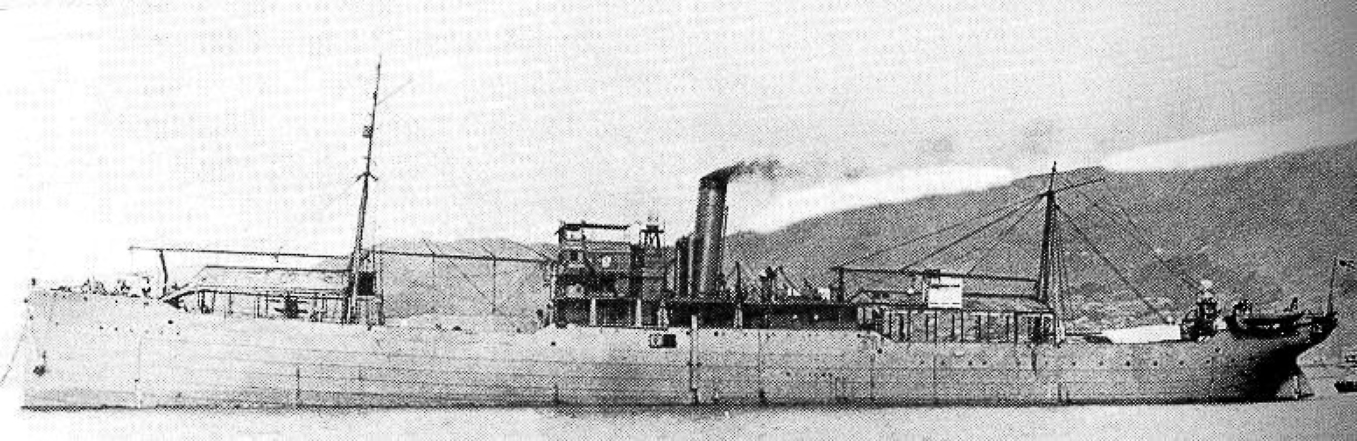
- Japanese seaplane carrier "Wakamiya"

History
- Name: Lethington
- Owner: 1901: William R. Rea; 1905: Nippon Yusen Shipping
- Port of registry: 1901: (United Kingdom) Belfast; 1905: (Japan) Kure
- Builder: Robert Duncan and company, Port Glasgow
- Launched: 21 September 1900
- Completed: October 1901
- Notes: chartered by Russia during Russo-Japanese War; Captured by Japan on 12 January 1905
- Fate: Scrapped

Japan
- Name: Wakamiya
- Acquired: 1913
- Commissioned: 17 August 1914
- Renamed: Takasaki Maru on 14 February 1905; Wakamiya Maru on 1 September 1905; Wakamiya on 1 June 1915
- Reclassified: Miscellaneous ship on 14 February 1905; Rented to NYK Line on 22 March 1907; Returned to IJN and reclassified transport ship on 9 March 1912; 2nd class coast defence ship on 1 June 1915; Aircraft carrier on 1 April 1920
- Stricken: 1 April 1931
- Fate: Sold to Eizo Aoki on 26 November 1931, scrapped in 1932

General characteristics
- Type: Seaplane carrier
- Displacement: 7,720 long tons (7,844 t)
- Length: 111.25 m (365 ft 0 in)
- Beam: 14.6 m (47 ft 11 in)
- Draught: 5.8 m (19 ft 0 in)
- Propulsion: VTE engines, 3 boilers, 1 shaft, 1,590 ihp (1,190 kW)
- Speed: 10 knots (19 km/h; 12 mph)
- Complement: 234
- Armament: 2 × 3.1 in (79 mm)/40 DP guns; 2 × 47 mm AA guns
- Aircraft carried: 4 × Farman MF.11 seaplanes

Wakamiya (Japanese: 若宮丸, later 若宮艦) was a seaplane carrier of the Imperial Japanese Navy and the first Japanese aircraft carrier. She was converted from a transport ship into a seaplane carrier and commissioned in August 1914. She was equipped with four Japanese-built French Maurice Farman seaplanes (powered by Renault 70 hp (52 kW) engines). In September 1914, she conducted the world's first naval-launched air raids.

== Early career ==
Wakamiya was initially the Russian freighter Lethington, built by Duncan in Port Glasgow, United Kingdom, laid down in 1900 and launched 21 September 1900. She was captured on a voyage from Cardiff to Vladivostok during the Russo-Japanese War near Okinoshima in 1905 by the Japanese torpedo boat TB No. 72. She was acquired by the Japanese government, renamed Takasaki-Maru until given the official name of Wakamiya-Maru on 1 September, and from 1907 was managed as a transport ship by NYK.

In 1913 she was transferred to the Imperial Japanese Navy and converted to a seaplane carrier, being completed on 17 August 1914. She was a 7,720-ton ship, with a complement of 234. She had two seaplanes on deck and two in reserve. Wakamiya did not possess a catapult; the seaplanes were lowered onto the water with a crane, whence they would take off, and then be retrieved from the water once their mission was completed.

== Siege of Qingdao ==
From 5 September 1914, Wakamiya conducted the world's first naval-launched air raids during the first months of the First World War from Kiaochow Bay off Qingdao, which is located in China. On 6 September 1914 a Farman aircraft launched by Wakamiya attacked the Austro-Hungarian cruiser Kaiserin Elisabeth and the German gunboat Jaguar in Qiaozhou Bay; neither ship was hit. Her seaplanes bombarded German-held land targets (communication centers and command centers) in the Qingdao peninsula of Shandong province and ships in Qiaozhou Bay from September to 6 November 1914, during the Siege of Qingdao.

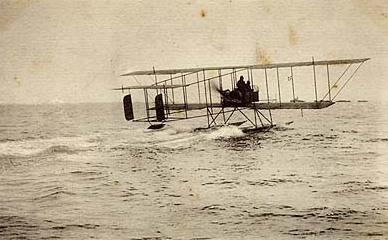
Japanese Maurice Farman seaplane, 1914.

British officers serving in the Battle of Qingdao commented on the operations of the Wakamiya:

Daily reconnaissances, weather permitting, were made by the Japanese seaplanes, working from the seaplane mother ship. They continued to bring valuable information throughout the siege. The mother ship was fitted with a couple of derricks for hoisting them in and out. During these reconnaissances they were constantly fired at by the German guns mostly with shrapnel, but were never hit. The Japanese airmen usually carried bombs for dropping on the enemy positions.

— Report by Lieut. Commanders G.S.F. Nash and G. Gipps, HMS Triumph, 18 November 1914.

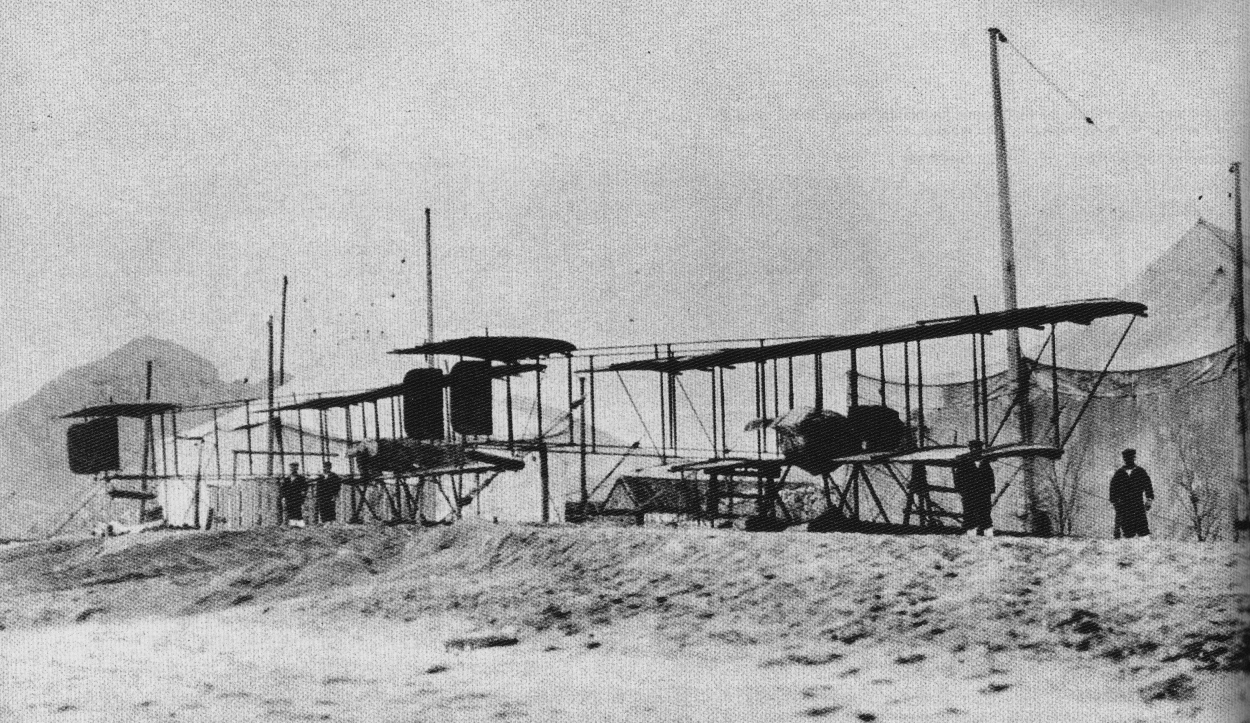
Two of Wakamiya's Maurice Farman seaplanes stationed on land in Qingdao after 30 September 1914.

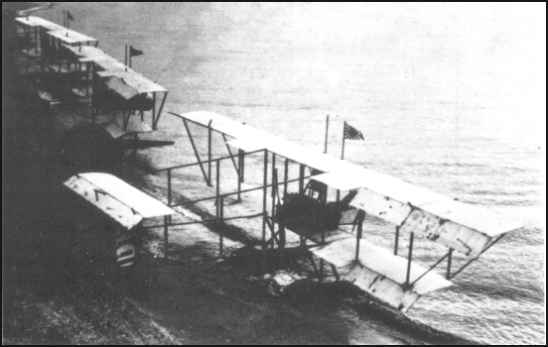
Three IJN Maurice Farman seaplanes

On 30 September, Wakamiya struck a German mine and had to be repaired for a week. On this occasion, her seaplanes were transferred on land at Shazikou (沙子口海岸), from where they accomplished further scouting and attack missions:

The seaplane corps and three Henry Farman 100 h.p. seaplanes were, in consequence of the damage done to the mother ship, landed at the Base already established at Laoshan Harbour (to the West of the Bay so nearer to Qingdao), and this proved eminently satisfactory.

— Report by Lieut. Commanders G.S.F. Nash and G. Gipps of HMS Triumph, 18 November 1914.

Altogether the seaplanes made 49 attacks, dropping 190 bombs on German defenses until the German surrender on 7 November. According to the British Naval Attaché to Tokyo, Captain Hon. Hubert Brand, who had been stationed for three months on Imperial Japanese Navy warships throughout the battle, the bombs used by the seaplanes were about equivalent to 12 pdr. shells.

== Later developments ==
Wakamiya was modified as a regular aircraft carrier with a launch platform on the foredeck in April 1920 (when she was renamed Wakamiya-kan 若宮艦). She accomplished in June 1920 the first Japanese take-off from an aircraft carrier. It is thought she had a pioneering role in developing aircraft carrier techniques for the Japanese aircraft carrier Hōshō, the first purpose-built aircraft carrier in the world.

She was used as a trials ship after 1924, stricken 1 April 1931, and scrapped in 1932.
