= SMS D1 =

D1-class torpedo boat of the Imperial German Navy

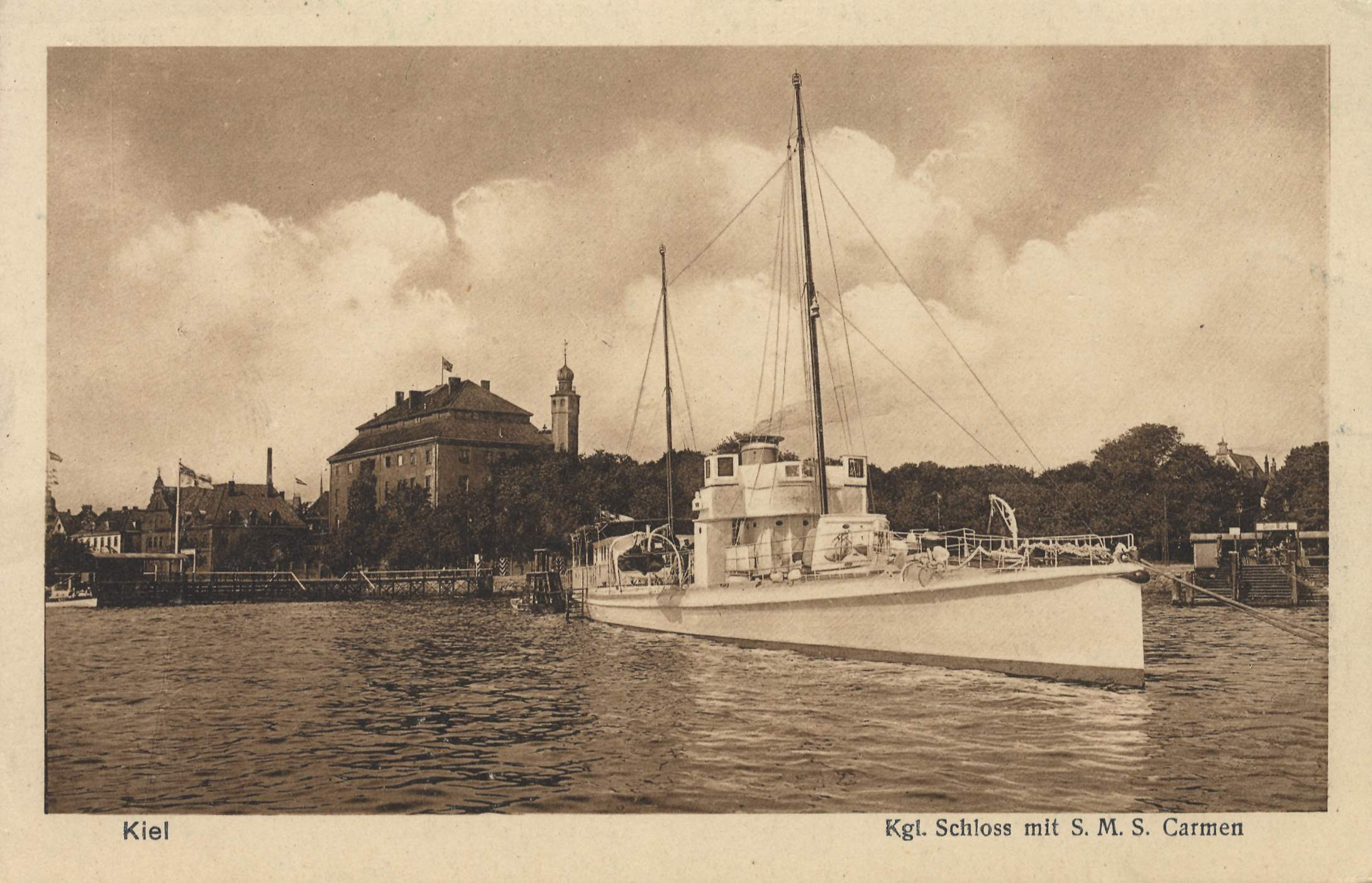
- Carmen between 1905 and 1914

History

Imperial German Navy
- Name: D2 until 1 August 1887; D1 from 1 August 1887 until May 1905; Carmen from May 1905
- Ordered: 1886
- Builder: Schichau-Werke, Elbing
- Launched: 19 December 1886
- Commissioned: 27 April 1887
- Stricken: 2 August 1921

General characteristics
- Class & type: D1-class divisional torpedo boat
- Displacement: 249 t (245 long tons) design; 300 t (295 long tons) full load
- Length: 56.5 metres (185.4 ft)
- Beam: 6.60 metres (21.7 ft)
- Draught: 1.83–3.40 m (6.0–11.2 ft)
- Installed power: 2,020 hp (1,510 kW)
- Propulsion: 2 × locomotive boilers; 1 × 3-cylinder triple expansion engine
- Speed: 20.6 kn (23.7 mph; 38.2 km/h)
- Complement: 45
- Armament: 6 × 3.7 cm Hotchkiss revolver cannon; 3 × 35 cm torpedo tubes

SMS D1 (Note: "SMS" stands for "Seiner Majestät Schiff" (transl. His Majesty's Ship)) was a "division" torpedo boat of the Imperial German Navy, originally designed as a leader for torpedo boat flotillas. The ship was built by the Schichau-Werke shipyard in Elbing, Prussia, and was launched on 19 December 1886 and entered service on 27 April 1887 with the name D2. She was renamed D1 on 1 August 1887. In May 1905, the ship was renamed Carmen, serving as station yacht and fleet tender until the outbreak of the First World War when she was rearmed and used for coastal defence. Carmen continued in service until November 1919, and was scrapped in 1921 .

== Design and construction ==
From 1884, the Imperial German Navy started to build up a large force of torpedo boats, and trials with the first divisions of torpedo boats in 1884–1885 resulted in a requirement for dedicated leaders for the torpedo boat flotillas. The new type, known as Division boats (Torpedodivisions-Boot), would carry the additional staff needed for the role of leading the flotillas, and still be capable of operating with the smaller torpedo boats. The Division boats were required to have similar speed and armament to the torpedo boats they would lead, while the enlarged size would give better seaworthiness, and resembled enlarged versions of contemporary torpedo boats.

In 1886, two Division boats, D1 and D2 were ordered from Schichau-Werke, which had established itself as Germany's leading builder of torpedo boats. Both ships were laid down that year at Schichau's shipyard in Elbing, Prussia, with D2 being launched on 19 December 1886 and commissioned on 27 April 1887. She exchanged names with her sister ship on 1 August 1887.

D1 was 56.05 m (183.9 ft) long overall, with a beam of 6.60 m (21.7 ft) and a draught of between 1.83 m (6.0 ft) forward and 3.40 m (11.2 ft) aft. Design displacement was 249 t (245 long tons), with full-load displacement 300 t (295 long tons). Two locomotive boilers supplied steam to a three-cylinder triple-expansion engine which drove a three bladed propeller. The machinery produced 2,020 hp (1,510 kW) during sea trials, propelling the ship to 20.6 kn (23.7 mph; 38.2 km/h). 56 t (55 long tons) of coal could be carried, giving a range of 660 nmi (760 mi; 1,220 km) at 18 kn (21 mph; 33 km/h) or 1,940 nmi (2,230 mi; 3,590 km) at 14 kn (16 mph; 26 km/h). This could be supplemented with a further 12 t (12 long tons) of coal carried on the ship's deck.

Three 35 cm torpedo tubes were fitted, two deck mounted and one in the ship's bow above the waterline, with six Hotchkiss 3.7 cm revolving cannon completing the armament. The guns were replaced by three 5 cm SK L/40 guns in 1893. (Note: The 3.7 cm Hotchkiss had proved to be of limited effectiveness against targets representing torpedo boats in trials from 1883.) The ship had a crew of 45 officers and other ranks, including a doctor and paymaster.

== Service ==
On commissioning, the ship served as a leader for active torpedo boat flotillas, and for reserve divisions of torpedo boats. In November 1893, D1 was listed as the leader of the 3rd Torpedo boat Division (Reserve) (III. Torpedobootsdivision (Reserve)), part of the 1st Torpedo Section (I. Torpedoabtheilung), based at Kiel, and continued in that role in November 1894, but in the next year had transferred to the 1st Torpedo boat Division. In 1898, she was leader of the 5th Torpedo boat Division (Reserve).

In 1900–1901, D1 was refitted by her builders, being fitted with new boilers. In May 1905, the ship was converted to serve as a station yacht for the Baltic fleet, and renamed Carmen. The ship was disarmed, and a large deckhouse added aft. This was designed to be quickly removed to allow the ship to be reconverted to military purposes. Between 1907 and 1909, Carmen was employed as a fleet tender, attached to the scouting force of the High Seas Fleet. She was then allocated to the Inspector General of the Navy, continuing in this role until the outbreak of the First World War. In the summer of 1910, Carmen took part in an expedition to the Arctic led by the Airship pioneer Ferdinand von Zeppelin, with Carmen acting as mail ship to the expedition.

The outbreak of war saw Carmen return to active military duties, and in the first few days of the war, while ships in reserve were still being remobilised, she was one of only a few ships available for defence of Germany's Baltic coast and the approaches to Kiel. (Note: On 31 July 1914, the Baltic station only had the gunboat Panther, four torpedo boats, the dispatch boat Sleipner and Carmen available.) On 5 August 1914, Carmen and the gunboat Panther guarded a minefield that had just been laid in the Great Belt. On 25 September, as a response to unjustfied fears that British forces were about to break through into the Baltic, Carmen, with the cruisers Hansa and Victoria Louise and the dispatch boat Sleipner, were ordered to guard Øresund, while other hastily assembled forces watched the Great and Little Belts, until it was realised that the rumours were false.

In October 1914, Carmen was listed as part of the 19th half flotilla, which was tasked with patrol duties in the Western Baltic. In May 1916, Carmen was attached to the Baltic's coastal defence division, and at the end of the war was part of the 4th Torpedo boat Flotilla.

Carmen was decommissioned on 30 November 1919 and stricken from the naval register on 2 August 1921. She was sold for 142,000 Marks and scrapped in Wilhelmshaven later in 1921.

== Bibliography ==
- Chesneau, Roger; Kolesnik, Eugene M., eds. (1979). Conway's All The World's Fighting Ships 1860–1905. London: Conway Maritime Press. ISBN 0-85177-133-5.
- Firle, Rudolph (1921). Der Krieg in der Ostsee: Erster Band: Von Kriegsbeginn bis Mitte März 1915. Der Krieg zur See: 1914–1918 (in German). Berlin: Verlag von E. S. Mittler und Sohn.
- Fock, Harald (1979). Schwarze Gesellen: Band 1: Torpedoboote bis 1914 (in German). Herford, Germany: Koehlers Verlagsgeselschaft mbH. ISBN 3-7822-0193-0.
- Fock, Harald (1989). Z-Vor! Internationale Entwicklung und Kriegseinsätze von Zerstörern und Torpedobooten 1914 bis 1939 (in German). Herford, Germany: Koehlers Verlagsgesellschaft mBH. ISBN 3-7822-0207-4.
- Goldrick, James (2015). Before Jutland: The Naval War in Northern Waters, August 1914–February 1915. Annapolis, Maryland, US: Naval Institute Press. ISBN 978-1-61251-881-7.
- Gröner, Erich; Jung, Dieter; Maass, Martin (1990). German Warships 1915–1945: Volume One: Major Surface Vessels. Annapolis, Maryland, US: Naval Institute Press. ISBN 0-87021-790-9.
- Hildebrand, Hans H.; Röhr, Albert; Steinmetz, Hans-Otto (1983). Die Deutschen Kriegschiffe: Biographen — ein Spiegel der Marinegeschichte von 1815 bis zur Gegenwart: Band 7 (in German). Herford, Germany: Koehlers Verlagsgesellschaft MBH. ISBN 3-7822-0267-8.
- Miethe, A; Hergesell, H., eds. (1911). Mit Zeppelin nach Spitzbergen: Bilder von Studienreise der deutschen arktischen Zeppelin-Expedition (PDF) (in German). Deutsches Verlagshaus Bong & Co.
- Nottlemann, Dirk (2026). "The Development of Torpedo Boats in the Imperial German Navy (Part II)". In Jordan, John (ed.). Warship 2026. Oxford: Osprey Publishing. pp. 70–90. ISBN 978-1-4728-7259-3.
- Rangelist der Kaiserlich Deutschen Marine für Das Jahr 1894. Berlin: Ernst Siegfried Mittler und Sohn. 1893 – via Heinrich Hein Universität Düsseldorf.
- Rangelist der Kaiserlich Deutschen Marine für Das Jahr 1895. Berlin: Ernst Siegfried Mittler und Sohn. 1894 – via Heinrich Hein Universität Düsseldorf.
- Rangelist der Kaiserlich Deutschen Marine für Das Jahr 1896. Berlin: Ernst Siegfried Mittler und Sohn. 1895 – via Heinrich Hein Universität Düsseldorf.
- Rangelist der Kaiserlich Deutschen Marine für Das Jahr 1899. Berlin: Ernst Siegfried Mittler und Sohn. 1898 – via Heinrich Hein Universität Düsseldorf.
- Rangelist der Kaiserlich Deutschen Marine für Das Jahr 1907. Berlin: Ernst Siegfried Mittler und Sohn. 1907 – via Heinrich Hein Universität Düsseldorf.
- Rangelist der Kaiserlich Deutschen Marine für Das Jahr 1908. Berlin: Ernst Siegfried Mittler und Sohn. 1908 – via Heinrich Hein Universität Düsseldorf.
- Stoelzel, Albert (1930). Ehrenrangliste der Kaiserlich Deutschen Marine 1914–1918 (in German). Berlin: Thormann & Goetsch.
