= St. Petersburgische Zeitung =

German language Russian newspaper, 1727–1915

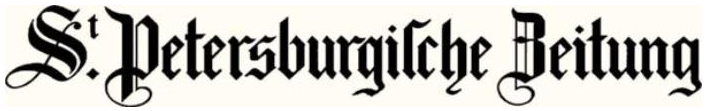
- Type: Daily
- Founded: 1727
- Ceased publication: 1915
- Language: German
- Headquarters: St. Petersburg, Russian Empire

The St. Petersburgische Zeitung (from 1852: St. Petersburger Zeitung) (Saint Petersburg Newspaper) was a German language newspaper in Saint Petersburg, published between 1727 and 1915 in the Russian Empire.

== History ==
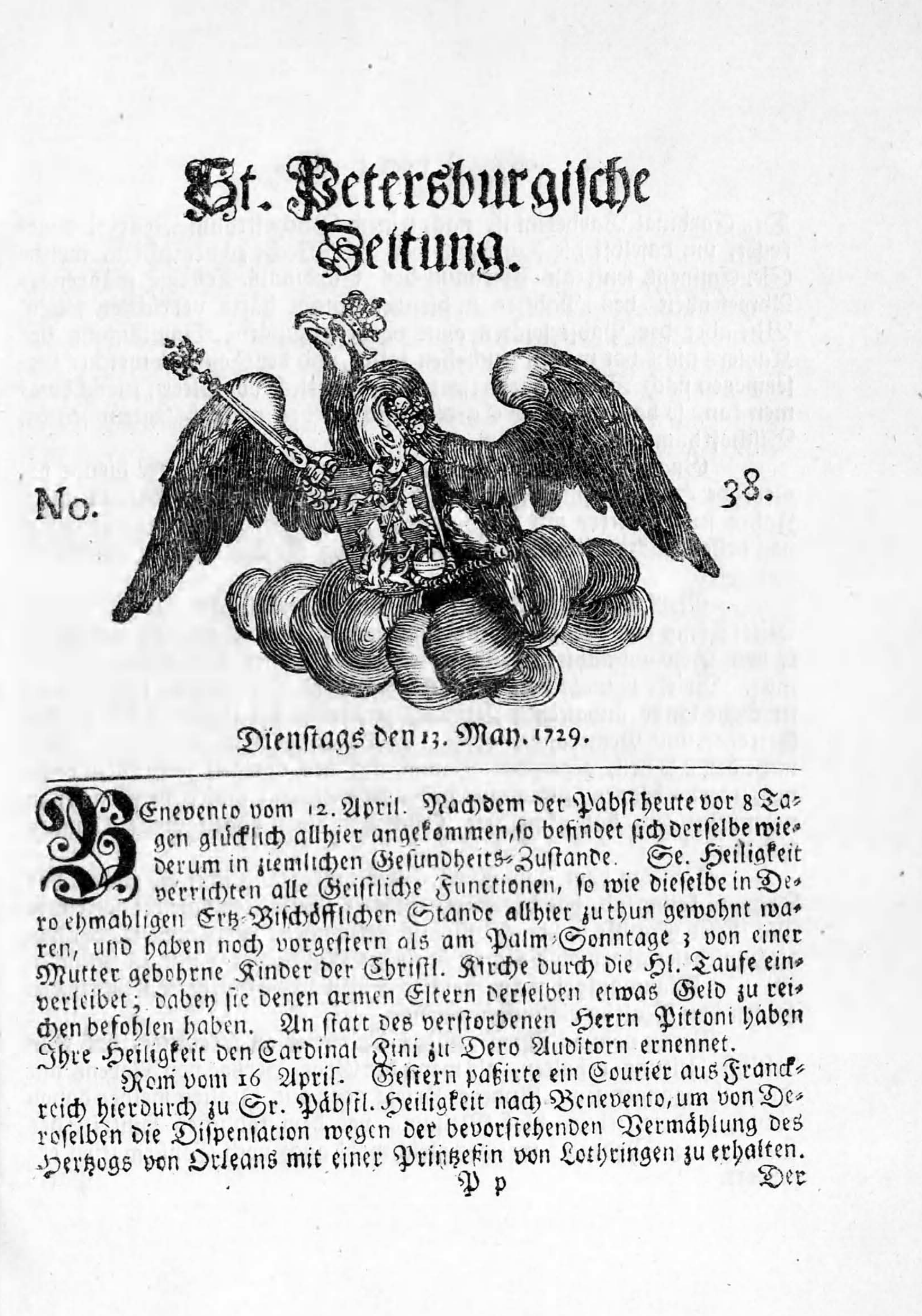
St Petersburgische Zeitung

The Sankt Petersburgische Zeitung was the first foreign German language newspaper as well as the second oldest newspaper in Russia. It was started at almost the same time as the first Russian newspaper in 1729. Initially it was a weekly newspaper, and starting in 1831, it was published daily. Until 1874 it was owned by the Russian Academy of Sciences, and thereafter it was transferred to the Ministry for National Education.

Under the editorship of Hofrat de:Clemens Friedrich Meyer (1852–1874) the paper received a modern appearance. In 1878 it was rented out to the Baltic German journalist de:Konstantin Paul Gerhard von Kügelgen (1843–1904), who combined it with the Nordische Presse (Northern Press). The newspaper then became the leading informational newspaper (de:Intelligenzblatt) of the Baltic region. After his death, his children de:Paul von Kügelgen (1875–1952) and de:Karl Konrad Emil von Kügelgen (1876–1945) continued to run the newspaper.

At the end of 1914, the St. Petersburger Zeitung ceased publication due to the First World War. The de:Sankt Petersburger Herold (Saint Petersburg Herald) was among its main competition in the late 19th century.

== Bibliography ==
- Carola L. Gottzmann, Petra Hörner: Lexikon der deutschsprachigen Literatur des Baltikums und St. Petersburgs: Vom Mittelalter bis zur Gegenwart, 2007, ISBN 9783110912135, S. 26, online
- Carl Eichhorn (1902). Die Geschichte der "St. Petersburger Zeitung", 1727-1902: Zum Tage der Feier des 175-jährigen Bestehens der Zeitung, dem 3. Januar 1902. Sankt Petersburg: Buchdruckerei der St. Petersburger Zeitung (A. Laschinsky).
