= Kamio Mitsuomi =

Japanese general (1856–1927)

Baron Kamio Mitsuomi GCMG
- 神尾 光臣
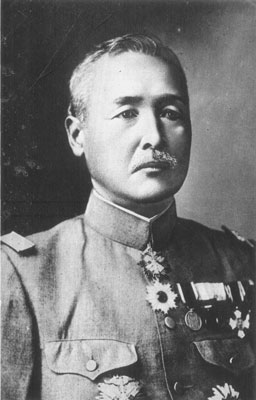
- Born: 27 February 1856; Okaya, Shinano, Japan
- Died: 6 February 1927 (aged 70); Sendagaya, Tokyo, Japan
- Military career
- Allegiance: Empire of Japan
- Branch: Imperial Japanese Army
- Service years: 1874–1925
- Rank: General
- Commands: IJA 18th Division
- Conflicts: First Sino-Japanese War; World War I
- Awards: Order of the Rising Sun; Order of the Sacred Treasure; Order of the Golden Kite; Order of the Sacred Kite; Honorary Knight Grand Cross of the Order of St Michael and St George (GCMG)

Baron Kamio Mitsuomi GCMG (神尾 光臣; 27 February 1856 – 6 February 1927) was a Japanese general in the Imperial Japanese Army, who commanded the Allied land forces during the Siege of Tsingtao in World War I.

== Biography ==
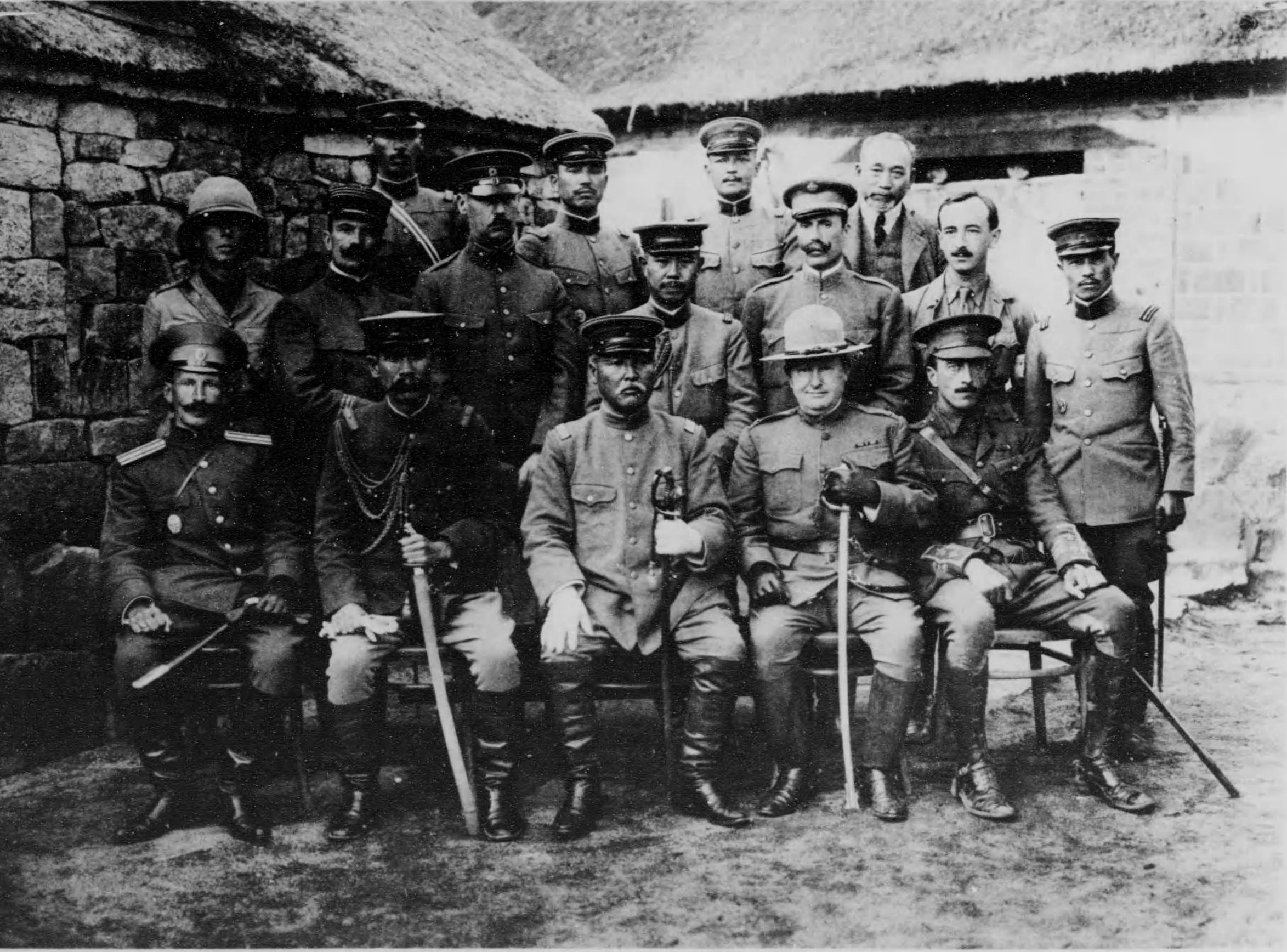
Foreign military observers of the German-Japanese War in the headquarters of Lieutenant General Mitsuomi Kamio at Chang-ts'un.

Kamio was the younger son of Kamio Heizaburō, a samurai retainer of the Suwa clan in Shinano province (present-day Nagano prefecture). He graduated from military academy in 1874, and served as a sergeant in the Imperial infantry during the Satsuma Rebellion of 1877. He rose rapidly through the ranks, to sergeant-major and then was commissioned as a brevet second lieutenant by the end of the same year. His commission was confirmed as official by the end of the war, and in 1882 was promoted to full lieutenant.

Kamio served in Qing dynasty China as a military attaché from 1885–86, during which time he was promoted to captain. On his return to Japan, he was assigned to various staff positions, and became a major in December 1891.

He returned to China again as a military attaché attached to the Japanese embassy in Beijing from 1892–1894. With the outbreak of the 1894–95 First Sino-Japanese War, he was a staff officer attached to Japanese Second Army. He was promoted to lieutenant colonel at the end of the war, and then to full colonel in 1897 when he assumed command of the 3rd Imperial Guard Regiment.

Kamio was sent to Europe from February 1899 to April 1900. Subsequently he was Chief of Staff of the IJA 1st Division in 1900, and of the IJA 10th Division the following year. In May 1902, he was promoted to major general.

During the Russo-Japanese War, Kamio held a series of further divisional commands: with 22nd Brigade, Japanese China Garrison Army, IJA 9th Division and IJA 18th Division, but not within front-line combat units. In December 1908, he was further promoted to lieutenant general. He was commander of the IJA 18th Division from 1912.

After the start of World War I, Kamio, with a reputation for solid caution rather than brilliance, was selected to lead Allied ground forces in the seizure of Tsingtao from Germany. Kamio made lavish use of logistics and overwhelming firepower to spare bloodshed as much as possible.

In Summer 1914, Kamio's 18th Division of 23,000 men backed by 144 guns began a bombardment of the port on 2 September 1914. The port fell a little over two months later, Kamio's siege tactics earning him praise for the skill with which he carefully deployed artillery tactics to aid infantry advances.

Kamio served thereafter as Japanese governor of Qingdao and was promoted to full general in June 1916. A month later, he was honored with elevation to the rank of baron (danshaku) under the kazoku peerage system.

He entered the reserves in August 1917, and retired completely in 1925. He died in 1927 and is buried at Zōshigaya cemetery.

== Honors ==
- Order of the Sacred Treasure (1st class) May 24, 1912
- Order of St Michael and St George (Knight Grand Cross) 1915
- Order of the Rising Sun (1st class) Nov 7 1915
- Order of the Golden Kite (1st class), Nov 1 1920
- Order of the Sacred Kite (2nd class)
- Order of the Sacred Kite (4th class)
