= Nathaniel Barnardiston (British Army officer) =

British Army general

Major-General Nathaniel Barnardiston CB MVO
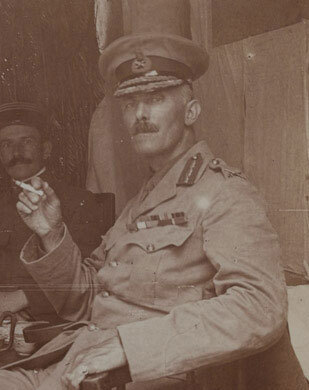
- Barnardiston at Divisional HQ, Chang-Tsun, 2 October 1914
- Born: 29 November 1858; Sudbury, Suffolk, England
- Died: 18 August 1919 (aged 60)
- Military career
- Allegiance: United Kingdom
- Branch: British Army
- Service years: 1878–1919
- Rank: Major-General
- Commands: 39th Division
- Conflicts: Second Boer War; First World War; Siege of Tsingtao
- Awards: Companion of the Order of the Bath; Member of the Royal Victorian Order; Grand Officer of the Military Order of Christ (Portugal)

Major-General Nathaniel Walter Barnardiston, CB, MVO (29 November 1858 – 18 August 1919) was a senior British Army officer.

== Military career ==
Barnardiston was commissioned into the 77th (East Middlesex) Regiment of Foot in 1878. He was promoted to lieutenant in March 1880.

After seeing active service in the Second Boer War, he became military attaché to Brussels, The Hague, and the Scandinavian Courts in 1902. He was promoted while serving on half-pay to lieutenant colonel on 24 February 1904 and became assistant commandant at the Royal Military College, Sandhurst, in 1906. He was made a brevet colonel in August 1907.

He was promoted to colonel and became assistant director of military training at the War Office in London on 19 February 1910, taking over this role from Colonel Henry Heath. He relinquished this position on 19 February 1914 and was placed on half-pay.

He saw action in the First World War during the Siege of Tsingtao in autumn 1914, before becoming General Officer Commanding 39th Division in August 1915, six months after being promoted to major general. He went on to be chief of the British military mission to Portugal, for which he was appointed a Grand Officer of the Military Order of Christ, before his death at the age of 60 in August 1919.

Military offices
New title	GOC 39th Division; 1915–1916	Succeeded by George Glas Sandeman Carey
