= 12e Régiment blindé du Canada =

12^{e} Régiment blindé du Canada
- Regimental badge
- Active: 1871–present
- Country: Canada
- Branch: Canadian Army
- Type: Armoured
- Role: Armoured cavalry
- Size: 2 regiments
- Part of: Regular Force: 5 Canadian Mechanized Brigade Group; Militia: 35 Canadian Brigade Group
- Garrison/HQ: Regular Force: Valcartier; Militia: Trois-Rivières
- Motto: Adsum (Latin for 'I am present')
- March: Quick: "Marianne s'en va-t-au-Moulin"; Slow: "Quand vous mourrez de nos amours"
- Anniversaries: 24 March 1871
- Engagements: World War I; World War II; War in Bosnia; War in Afghanistan
- Website: canada.ca/en/army/corporate/2-canadian-division/12-regiment-blinde-canada.html

Commanders
- Current commander: Regular Force: LCol David Cameron, CD: Militia: LCol Stéphan LeBlanc
- Honorary colonel: BGen Denis Mercier, CD
- Honorary lieutenant-colonel: Pierre Ayotte

Insignia
- NATO Map Symbol
- Abbreviation: 12eRBC

The 12^{e} Régiment blindé du Canada (a translation of its former name, the "12th Canadian Armoured Regiment") is a Canadian Army armoured regiment based in CFB Valcartier, on the outskirts of Quebec City. The regiment has both a Regular Force and a Primary Reserve unit. The 12^{e} Régiment blindé du Canada's abbreviation is 12^{e} RBC.

In the Regular Force regiment, all three squadrons are based on the LAV family of vehicles and are designated as light armoured cavalry squadrons. Each squadron is organized into troops of four vehicles each. C Squadron, 12^{e} RBC, is at CFB Gagetown as part of C Squadron, the Royal Canadian Dragoons.

The Primary Reserve unit trains for influence activities, such as civil–military co-operation and psychological warfare.

== Lineage ==
=== 12^{e} Régiment blindé du Canada ===
- Originated 24 March 1871 in Trois-Rivières, Quebec, as the Three Rivers Provisional Battalion of Infantry
- Redesignated 4 June 1880 as the 86th "Three Rivers" Battalion of Infantry
- Redesignated 8 May 1900 as the 86th Three Rivers Regiment
- Redesignated 29 March 1920 as The Three Rivers Regiment
- Converted 15 December 1936 to armour and redesignated as The Three Rivers Regiment (Tank)
- Redesignated 13 August 1940 as the 2nd Regiment, The Three Rivers Regiment (Tank)
- Redesignated 1 April 1941 as the 12th (Reserve) Army Tank Battalion, (The Three Rivers Regiment (Tank))
- Redesignated 15 August 1942 as the 12th (Reserve) Army Tank Regiment (The Three Rivers Regiment (Tank))
- Converted 1 April 1946 to artillery and redesignated as the 46th Anti-Tank Regiment, RCA (Three Rivers Regiment)
- Converted 19 June 1947 to armour and redesignated the 24th Armoured Regiment (Three Rivers Regiment)
- Redesignated 4 February 1949 as Le Régiment de Trois-Rivières (24th Armoured Regiment)
- Redesignated 19 May 1958 as Le Régiment de Trois-Rivières (RCAC)
- Redesignated 2 May 1968 as the 12^{e} Régiment blindé du Canada

=== Lineage chart ===
Lineage chart

1812 | 8th Bn, Select Embodied Militia | Trois-Rivières Div.
1815 | Disbanded | Disbanded
1869 | Independent infy coys
1871 | Three Rivers Provisional Bn of Infy
1880 | 86th "Three Rivers" Bn of Infy
1900 | 86th Three Rivers Regt
1916 | 178th "Overseas" Bn, CEF
1917 | Disbanded
1918 | 259th Bn, Canadian Rifles, CEF (Siberia)
1920 | 1st Bn (178th Bn, CEF), The Three Rivers Regt | 2nd Bn, (Note: Reserve order of battle) The Three Rivers Regt | Disbanded
Disbanded
1936 | The Three Rivers Regt (Tank)
1939 | The Three Rivers Regt (Tank), CASF
1940 | The Three Rivers Regt (Tank), CAC, CASF | 2nd Regt, The Three Rivers Regt (Tank)
1941 | 12th Army Tank Bn (The Three Rivers Regt (Tank)), CAC, CASF | 12th (Reserve) Army Tank Bn (The Three Rivers Regt (Tank))
1942 | 12th Army Tank Regt (Three Rivers Regt (Tank)), CAC, CASF | 12th (Reserve) Army Tank Regt (The Three Rivers Regt (Tank))
1943 | 12th Armd Regt (Three Rivers Regt), CAC, CASF
1945 | 12th Armd Regt (Three Rivers Regt), RCAC, CASF
1945 | Disbanded
1946 | 46th Anti-Tank Regt, RCA (Three Rivers Regt)
1947 | 24th Armd Regt (Three Rivers Regt)
1949 | Le Rég^{t} de Trois-Rivières (24th Armd Regt)
1958 | Le Rég^{t} de Trois-Rivières (RCAC)
1968 | 12^{e} Rég^{t} blindé du Canada | 12^{e} Rég^{t} blindé du Canada (Militia)
1998 | Perpetuates 259th Bn | Perpetuates 259th Bn
2012 | Perpetuates War of 1812 units | Perpetuates War of 1812 units

== Perpetuations ==
=== War of 1812 ===
- 8th Battalion, Select Embodied Militia
- Trois-Rivières Division

=== Great War ===
- 178th Battalion (Canadien-Français), CEF
- 259th Battalion, Canadian Rifles, CEF (Siberia)

== Operational history ==
=== Great War ===
The 178th Battalion (Canadien-Français), CEF was authorized on 15 July 1916 and embarked for Britain on 3 March 1917, where, on 16 March 1917, its personnel were absorbed by the 10th Reserve Battalion, CEF to provide reinforcements for the Canadian Corps in the field. The battalion disbanded on 21 May 1917.

The 259th Battalion, Canadian Rifles, CEF (Siberia) was authorized on 1 November 1918 and embarked for Russia on 22 and 26 December 1918. There, it served with the 16th Infantry Brigade as part of the Allied Forces in eastern Russia until 19 May 1919. The battalion disbanded on 6 November 1920.

=== Second World War ===
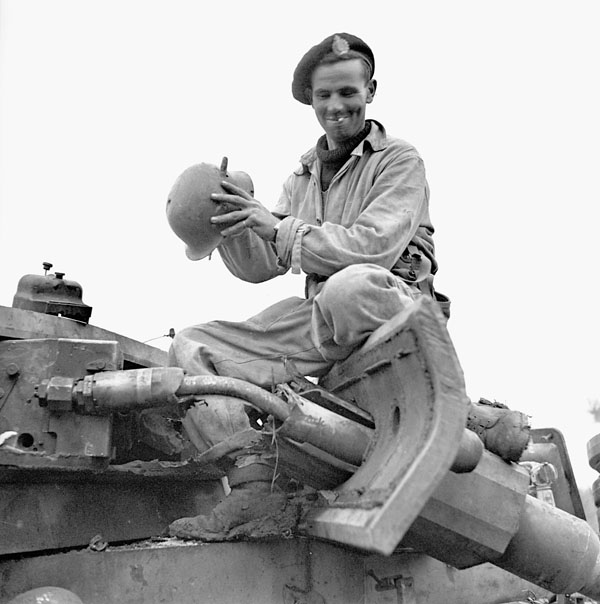
Trooper J. W. McConnell, Three Rivers Regiment, examining a knocked-out German PzKpfW III tank, San Leonardo di Ortona, Italy, December 20, 1943

The regiment mobilized as The Three Rivers Regiment (Tank), CASF, for active service on 1 September 1939. It was redesignated as The Three Rivers Regiment (Tank), CAC, CASF, on 13 August 1940. It was converted to armour on 23 November 1940, and to an army tank battalion on 11 February 1941, designated as the 12th Army Tank Battalion (The Three Rivers Regiment (Tank)), CAC, CASF. It was redesignated as the 12th Army Tank Regiment (Three Rivers Regiment (Tank)), CAC, CASF, on 15 May 1942; as the 12th Armoured Regiment (Three Rivers Regiment), CAC, CASF, on 26 August 1943; and as the 12th Armoured Regiment (Three Rivers Regiment), RCAC, CASF on 2 August 1945.

On 21 June 1941 it embarked for Britain. The regiment landed in Sicily on 10 July 1943 and in Italy on 12 September 1943 as part of the 1st Canadian Armoured Brigade. On 8 March 1945 the regiment moved with the I Canadian Corps to North-West Europe as part of Operation Goldflake. There it fought until the end of the war. The overseas regiment disbanded on 30 November 1945.

=== Post-war ===
The Regular Force regiment served on peacekeeping duty in CYPRUS as part of OPERATION SNOWGOOSE from August 1990 to March 1991.

=== Afghanistan ===
The Regular regiment provided several reconnaissance squadrons and troops and tank crews to the Canadian Task Forces that served in Afghanistan from 2002 to 2014.

== History ==
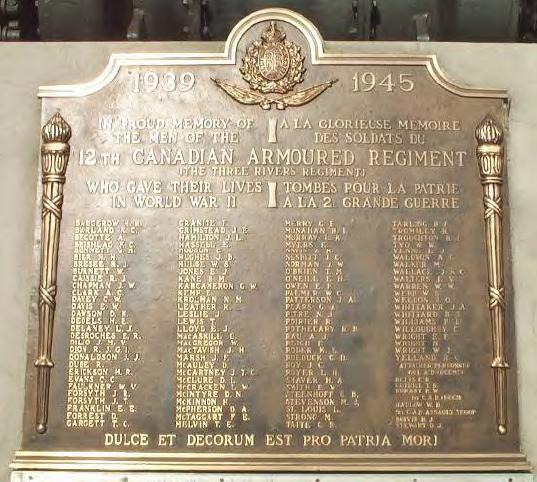
Plaque commemorating The Three Rivers Regiment

Its origins are in The Three Rivers Regiment, a militia (Reserve Force) regiment based in Trois-Rivières, a town halfway between Montreal and Quebec City. It originally formed in 1871 as the Three Rivers Provisional Battalion of Infantry. This was a new battalion headquarters that united four previously independent infantry companies that had been formed in 1869 at Trois-Rivières, Rivière-du-Loup-en-Haut, Berthier-en-Haut and Saint-Gabriel-de-Brandon. The battalion was given a number in 1880 (86th "Three Rivers" Battalion of Infantry) and raised to regiment status in 1900 (86th Three Rivers Regiment).

In the First World War, the Canadian militia infantry units were not mobilized, but instead new units were formed from volunteers from the militia and new recruits. The militia units generally became organizations for recruiting, induction and preliminary training. The 86th Regiment recruited the 178th "Overseas" Battalion, CEF, in 1916. The 178th Battalion was broken up in England in 1917, but enough of its former members fought at the Battle of Amiens (1918) that the battalion qualified for a battle honour, which the 12^{e} RBC perpetuates.

The regiment also perpetuates the 259th Battalion, Canadian Rifles, Canadian Expeditionary Force (Siberia).

In the post-war reorganization of the Militia, the 86th Regiment lost its number, becoming simply The Three Rivers Regiment. In the 1936 reorganization, it became an infantry tank unit, The Three Rivers Regiment (Tank).

In the Second World War, the regiment mobilized an armoured regiment, which sailed to England in 1941. After two years of training, the 12th Armoured Regiment (Three Rivers Regiment) landed in Sicily, where it supported 1st Canadian Infantry Division throughout Operation Husky almost exclusively and gained a reputation for tenacity and courage. The 12th CAR was the first Canadian armoured regiment to destroy panzers in battle; a Panzer III and one of the Mark IV "Specials" were destroyed by its men at Grammichele on July 15. The regiment also took part Operation Baytown, landings on the Italian mainland in September 1943, as well and were often called upon to support British infantry battalions based on their quiet professionalism. Though the formation it was part of was originally known as 1st Tank Brigade, the name was changed to 1st Canadian Armoured Brigade later on.

After the war, the regiment was given a (partially) French name: Le Régiment de Trois-Rivières (24th Armoured Regiment).

In 1968 the regiment was renamed and expanded to include a new Regular Force regiment in addition to the original Militia regiment. The Regular Force unit is called 12^{e} Régiment blindé du Canada, and the Militia unit is named 12^{e} Régiment blindé du Canada (Militia) (or in French, 12^{e} Régiment blindé du Canada (Milice)). The number in the regimental title commemorates the Second World War unit, 12th Armoured Regiment (Three Rivers Regiment).

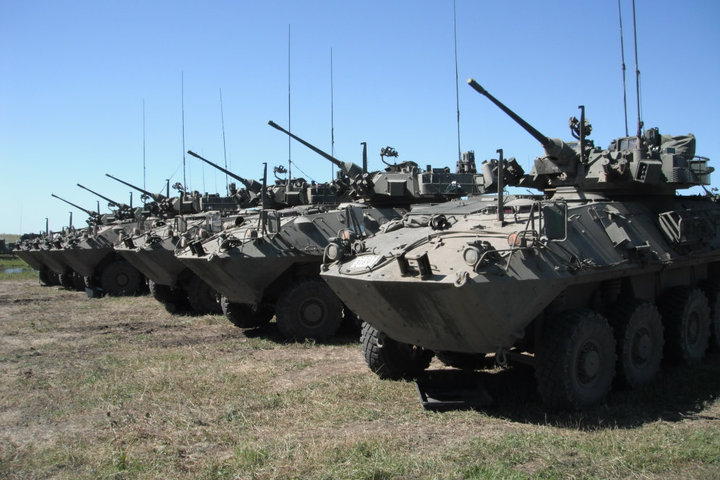
LAV-25 Coyotes of 12^{e} Régiment blindé du Canada.

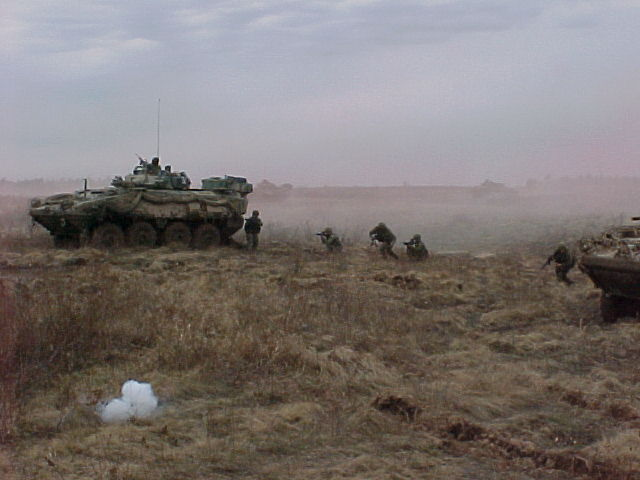
12^{e} Régiment blindé du Canada

== Alliances ==
- United Kingdom – Royal Tank Regiment
- France – 2^{e} Régiment de hussards
- United States - 3rd Light Armored Reconnaissance Battalion

== Battle honours ==
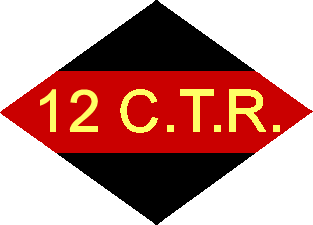
Unit patch of the 12th Canadian Army Tank Regiment during the Second World War

In the list below, battle honours in capitals were awarded for participation in large operations and campaigns, while those in lowercase indicate honours granted for more specific battles. Those battle honours in bold type are emblazoned on the regimental guidon.

=== War of 1812 ===
- Non-emblazonable honorary distinction Defence of Canada – 1812–1815 – Défense du Canada

=== Great War ===
- **Amiens** (Note: The regiment bears this battle honour as it perpetuates the 178th (Canadien-Français) Battalion, CEF. The 178th was a reserve battalion and never served on the front. However, enough of its former members served at Amiens to earn a battle honour.)
- Siberia 1918–19 (Note: On 25 June 1998, the regiment was granted the perpetuation of the '259th Battalion (Canadian Rifles), CEF (Siberia)' (NDHQ Memorandum 5400-34 (DHH), 23 June 1998).)

=== Second World War ===
- **Landing in Sicily**
- Grammichele
- Piazza Armerina
- Valguarnera
- Agira
- **Adrano**
- Troina Valley
- **Sicily, 1943**
- **Termoli**
- The Gully
- **Ortona**
- **Cassino II**
- Gustav Line
- **Liri Valley**
- Hitler Line
- **Trasimene Line**
- Arezzo
- Advance to Florence
- Monte La Pieve
- Monte Spaduro
- **Italy, 1943–1945**
- Apeldoorn
- **North-West Europe, 1945**

=== War in Afghanistan ===
- Afghanistan

== Trois-Rivières Military Museum ==
Trois-Rivières Military Museum
- Location: 574 Saint-François-Xavier Street, Trois-Rivières, QC G9A 1R6 Canada
- Type: Regimental museum
- Website: www.armee.gc.ca/12rbc_milice/qg-hq/musee-museum-eng.aspx

The museum collects, preserves, researches, interprets and exhibits artifacts which reflect the military history of Trois-Rivières, the 12th Armoured Regiment (Three Rivers Regiment) story and the history of the Canadian Militia. The museum serves as a training medium to teach regimental history, and to stimulate and foster within the general public an ongoing interest in the regiment, its activities and accomplishments. The Museum is affiliated with: CMA, CHIN, OMMC and Virtual Museum of Canada.

== Order of precedence ==
=== Regular Force ===
While the regiment is the oldest of the Regular Force armoured regiments, its Regular Force component takes its precedence from its date of entry into the Regular Force (1968). The Reserve Force component continues to take its precedence from 1871 within the Reserve Force.

| Preceded by Lord Strathcona's Horse (Royal Canadians) | 12^{e} Régiment blindé du Canada | Succeeded by Last in precedence of Regular armoured regiments |

=== Reserve Force ===
| Preceded by Sherbrooke Hussars | 12^{e} Régiment blindé du Canada (Militia) | Succeeded by 1st Hussars |
