= 178th Battalion (Canadien-Français), CEF =

178th Battalion, CEF
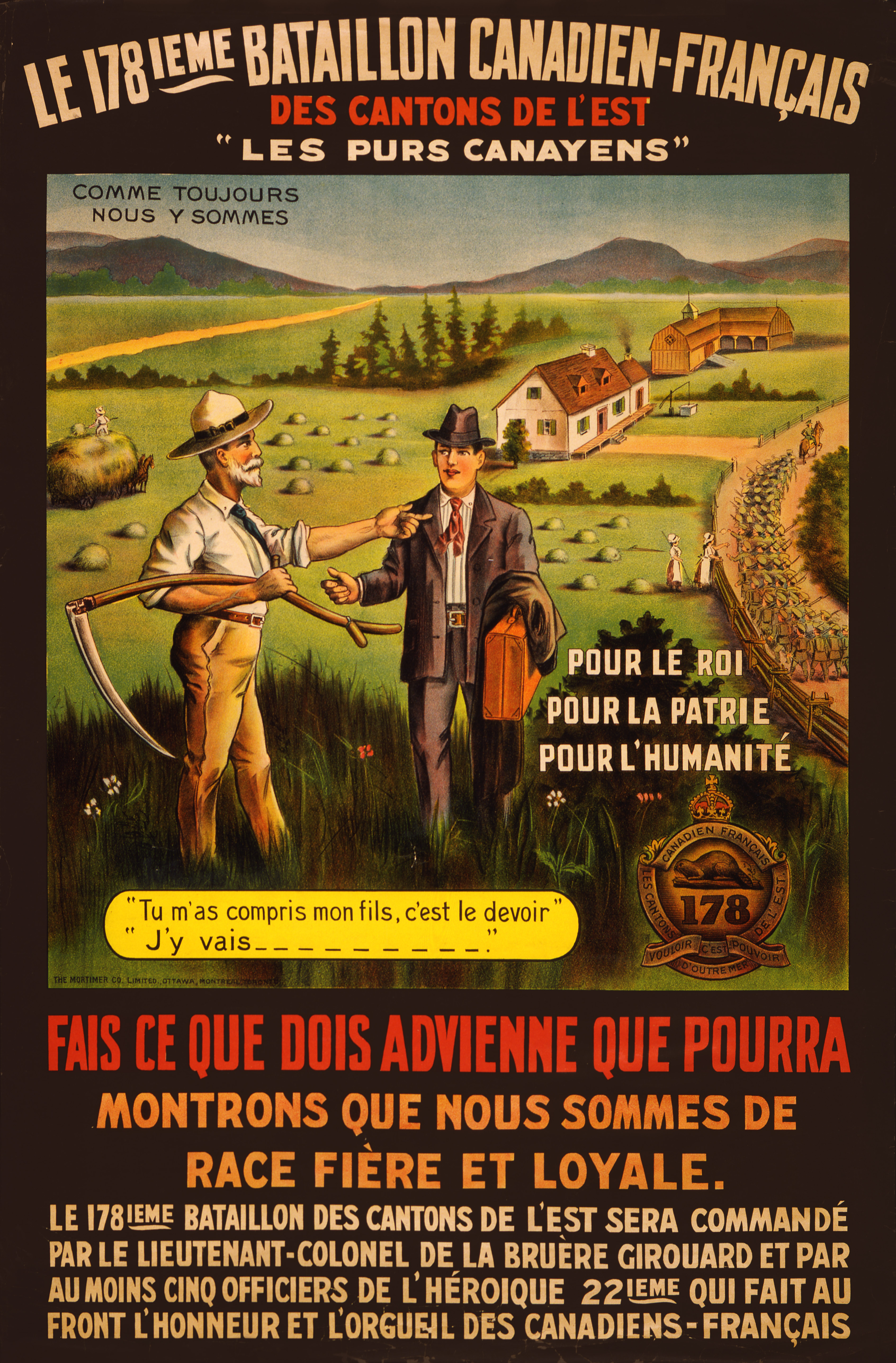
- Recruitment poster for the battalion, 1915
- Active: 15 July 1916–21 May 1917
- Disbanded: 21 May 1917
- Country: Canada
- Branch: Canadian Expeditionary Force
- Type: Infantry
- Mobilization headquarters: Victoriaville, Quebec
- Mottos: French: vouloir c'est pouvoir, lit. 'where there's a will there's a way'
- Battle honours: The Great War, 1917

Commanders
- Officer commanding: LCol René-Arthur de la Bruère Girouard

The 178th (Canadien-Français) Battalion, CEF was a unit in the Canadian Expeditionary Force during the First World War.

Based in Victoriaville, Quebec, the unit began recruiting during the winter of 1915/16 in Military Districts 4 and 5, and in eastern Ontario. The battalion absorbed the 233rd Battalion (Canadiens-Français du Nord-Ouest), CEF, in March 1917, and sailed to England later that same month. Upon arrival, the 178th Battalion was absorbed into the 10th Reserve Battalion on March 16, 1917.

The 178th (Canadien-Français) Battalion had one officer commanding: Lieutenant-Colonel René-Arthur de la Bruère Girouard.

The battalion badge is a beaver couchant on plinth inscribed d'outre-mer above the numeral 178, below an arch inscribed canadien-français supporting the Tudor crown, and surrounded by scrolls inscribed "Arthabaska", "Drummond", "Nicolet", and vouloir c'est pouvoir.

The perpetuation of the battalion was assigned to the Three Rivers Regiment in 1920. This regiment is now named 12^{e} Régiment blindé du Canada.
