= CFB Valcartier =

Military base near Quebec City, Canada

Valcartier (W/C J.H.L. (Joe) Lecomte) Heliport 2nd Canadian Division Support Base, Valcartier
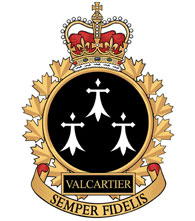
- 2 CDSB Valcartier
- IATA: none; ICAO: CYOY

Summary
- Airport type: Military
- Owner: Government of Canada
- Operator: DND
- Location: Saint-Gabriel-de-Valcartier, Quebec
- Built: 1914
- Commander: Colonel J.L.S. Ménard
- Occupants: 2nd Canadian Division
- Time zone: EST (UTC−05:00)
  - Summer (DST): EDT (UTC−04:00)
- Elevation AMSL: 550 ft / 168 m
- Coordinates: 46°54′10″N 071°30′13″W
- Website: Official website

Map
- Location of CFB Valcartier in Quebec CYOY (Canada)

Helipads
Number	Length		Surface
Number	ft	m	Surface
1	150	46	n/a
- Source: Canada Flight Supplement

2nd Canadian Division Support Base Valcartier (2 CDSB Valcartier), formerly known as and commonly referred to as Canadian Forces Base Valcartier (CFB Valcartier), is a Canadian Forces base located in the municipality of Saint-Gabriel-de-Valcartier, 8 nautical miles (15 km; 9.2 mi) north northwest of Quebec City, Quebec, Canada. The 2nd Canadian Division is stationed at the base, comprising the 5 Canadian Mechanized Brigade Group and the 2nd Canadian Division Support Group.

== Origins ==
CFB Valcartier was originally erected as a military training camp in August 1914 as part of the mobilization of the Canadian Expeditionary Force at the onset of World War I.

Inaugurated by Jean Chrétien, then Prime Minister of Canada, in 1995, a 10 ft 6 in (3.2 m) high bronze figure of a World War I soldier (1995) by André Gauthier at the entrance to CFB Valcartier commemorates the training of Canadian Army volunteers for the European battlefields in World War I.

The site was also used as an internment camp for "enemy aliens", mainly eastern Europeans. The name Valcartier comes from the town of Saint-Gabriel-de-Valcartier, of which a large section was expropriated in order to create the military training camp. Due to its proximity to the Port of Quebec, Valcartier became the largest military camp on Canadian soil, including some 32,000 men, 8,000 horses, and one black bear

In 1968, after the unification of the Canadian Armed Forces, the title 5 Canadian Mechanized Brigade Group was assigned to the brigade group established in CFB Valcartier.

== Geography ==
The base is 12 by 24 km (7.5 by 14.9 mi) and is located in the Quebec City region, of Quebec, Canada.

== Military presence ==
Currently, Valcartier is home to the 2nd Canadian Division. The division has two formations: 2nd Canadian Division Support Group (2 CDSG) and 5 Canadian Mechanized Brigade Group (5 CMBG).

The following units are stationed at Valcartier. Included are affiliated units and other units that are not directly part of 2nd Canadian Division:

- Units
  - 5e Régiment d’artillerie légère du Canada (5 RALC)
  - 12^{e} Régiment blindé du Canada (12 RBC)
  - 5 Combat Engineer Regiment (5^{e} Régiment du génie de combat) (5 RGC)
  - 5 CMBG Headquarters and signals squadron ( Quartier-général et escadron des transmissions )
  - 1st Battalion, Royal 22nd Regiment
  - 2nd Battalion, Royal 22nd Regiment
  - 3rd Battalion, Royal 22nd Regiment
  - 5 Service Battalion (5^{e} Bataillon des services du Canada) (which also provides services from ASU Saint-Jean and CFB Montreal)
- Affiliated units
  - 5 Field Ambulance (5^{e} Ambulance de campagne)
  - 5 Military Police Platoon (5^{e} Peloton de police militaire)
  - 430 Tactical Helicopter Squadron
  - 1 Dental Unit Detachment, Valcartier
  - Naval Fleet School (Quebec)

The base also houses 430 Tactical Helicopter Squadron, CI SQFT (Land Force Quebec Area Training Centre), in addition to providing training facilities for most Quebec-based reserve units. The Myriam Bédard Biathlon Training Centre is also located on the base.

CFB Valcartier is also home to a Defence Research and Development Canada (DRDC) location, which conducts military research for the Canadian Armed Forces.

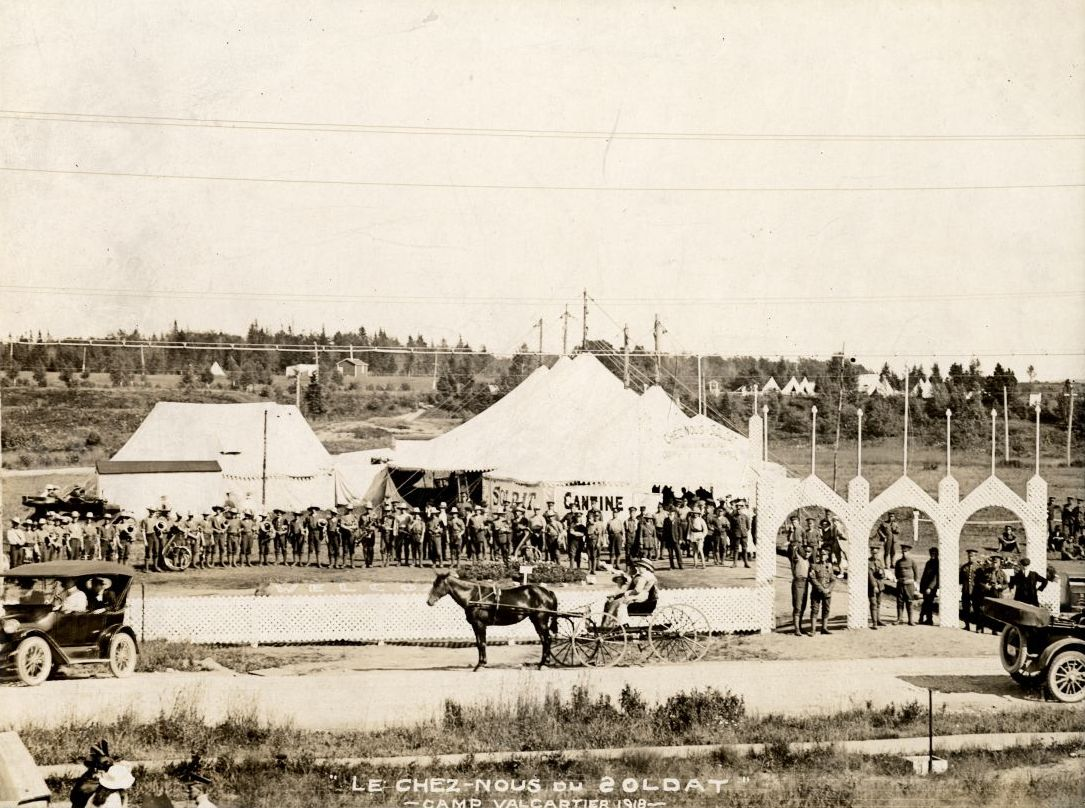
Canteen named "Le chez nous du soldat", 1918

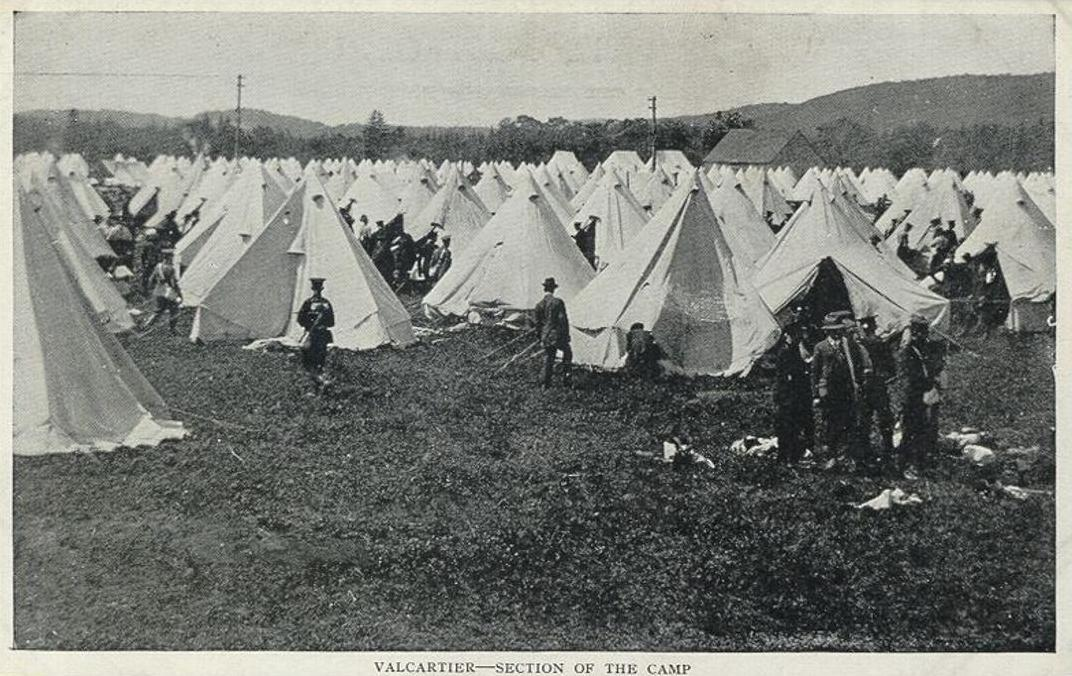
Postcard of tents hastily erected to accommodate thousands of troops during the First World War

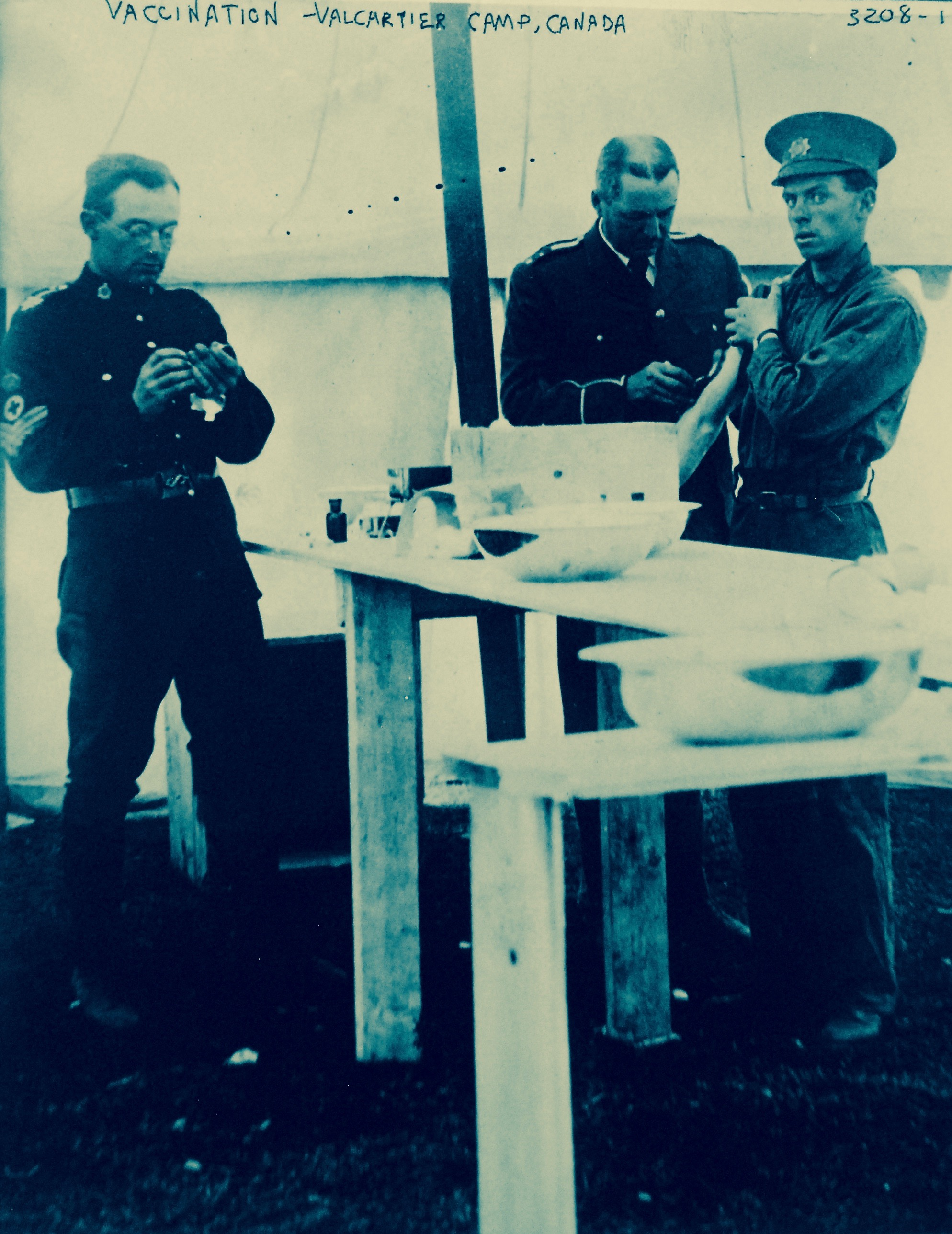
Vaccination of soldier during WWI

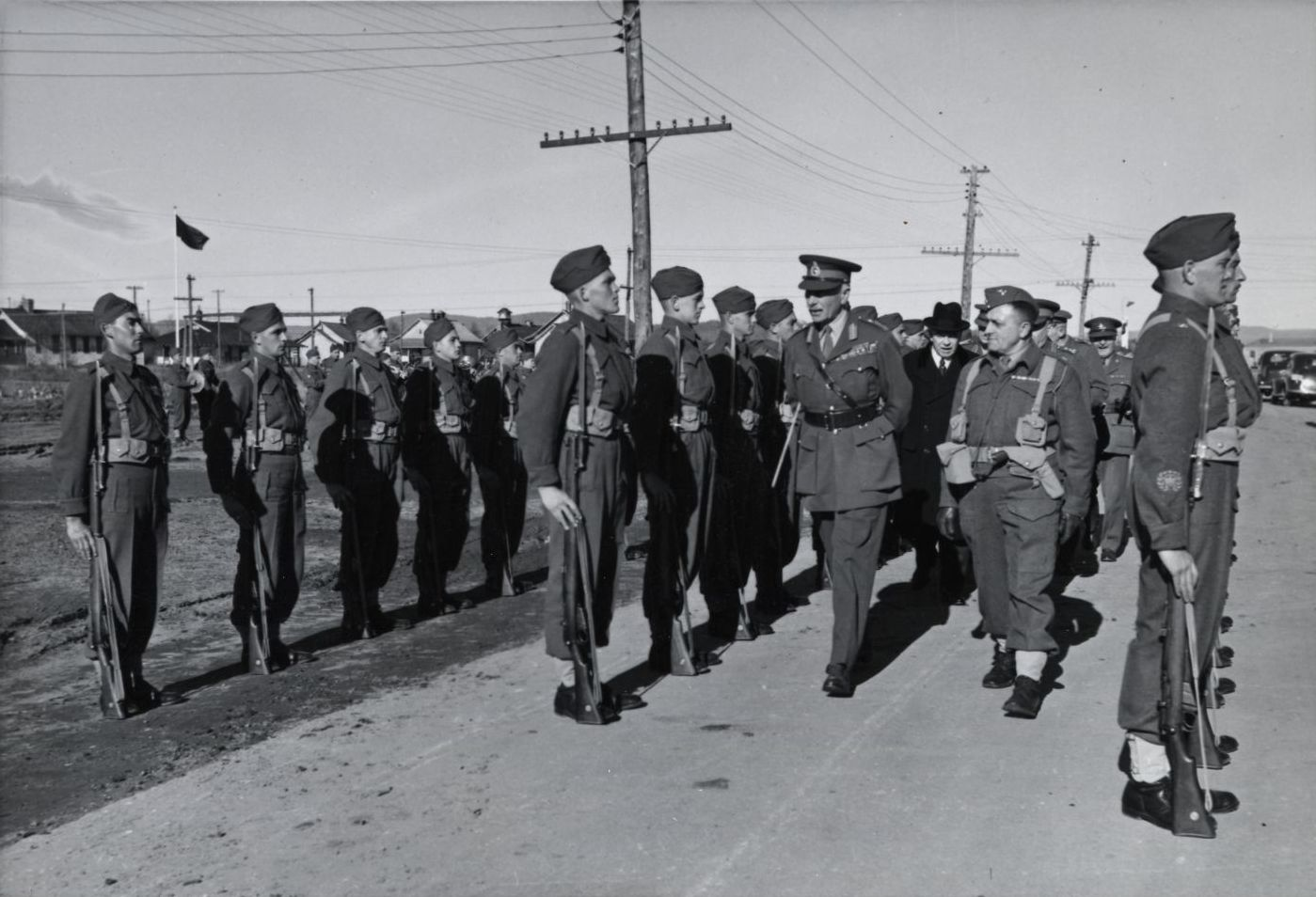
Governor General of Canada, Alexander Cambridge, 1st Earl of Athlone, and Prime Minister of Canada, William Lyon Mackenzie King, inspecting troops, 1940

=== Cadets ===
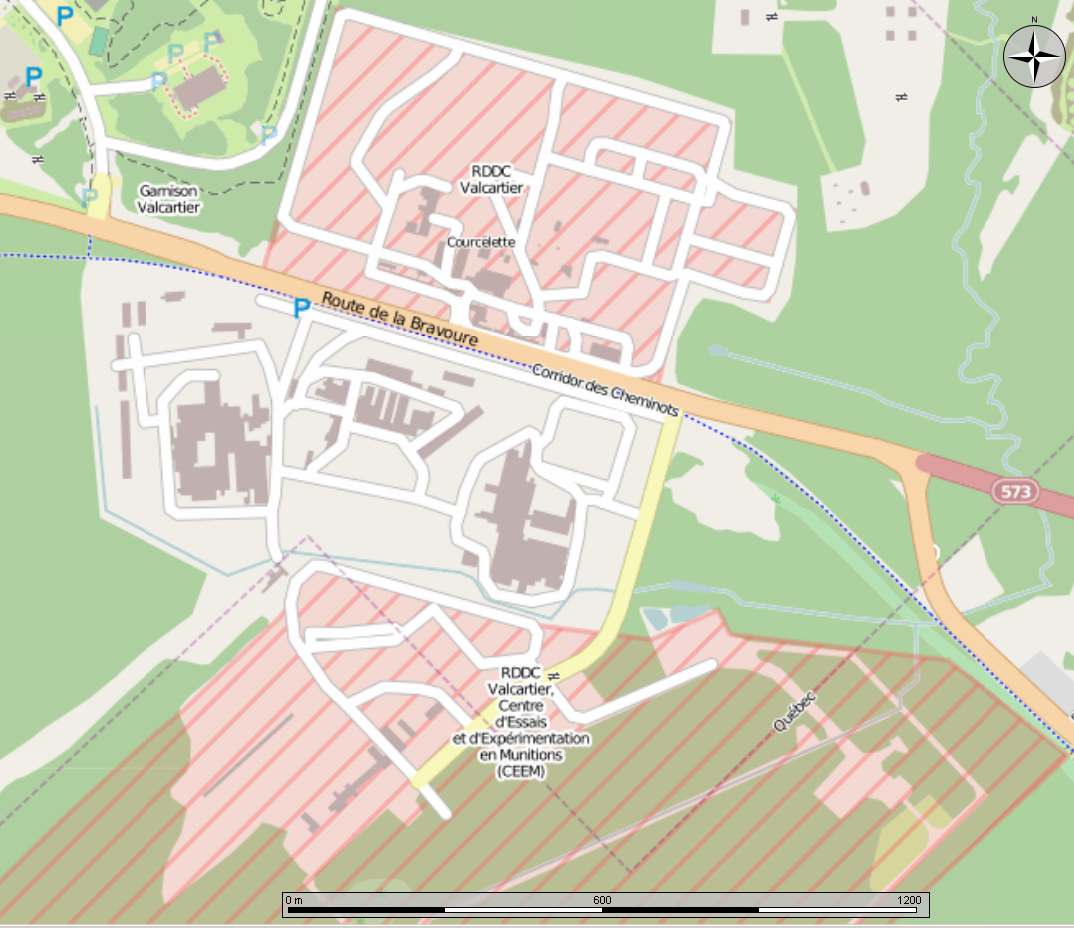
Map of the base

2 CDSB Valcartier is also the home of the Army Cadet Summer Training Centre Valcartier, which trains Royal Canadian Sea Cadets, Royal Canadian Army Cadets and Royal Canadian Air Cadets of the Eastern Region / Province of Quebec. In July 1974, an explosives safety training accident involving "D" Company killed six cadets and injured over 50. A coroner's inquiry found the instructor criminally responsible.

The various summer training courses offered at Valcartier Cadet Training Centre are the following:

- Basic Fitness and Sports course offered to Sea, Army and Air cadets, within OLYMPUS Company;
- Fitness and Sports Instructor course offered to Sea, Army and Air cadets, within OLYMPUS Company;
- Basic Expedition course offered only to Army cadets, within EVEREST Company;
- Expedition Instructor course offered only to Army cadets, within EVEREST Company;
- Basic Marksmanship Course offered to Sea, Army and Air cadets, within ENFIELD Company;
- Air Rifle Marksmanship Instructor Course offered to Sea, Army and Air cadets within ENFIELD Company;
- Basic Drill and Ceremonial Course offered to Sea, Army and Air cadets within TRIUMPH Company;
- Drill and Ceremonial Instructor Course offered to Sea, Army and Air cadets within TRIUMPH Company;
- Basic Survival Course offered to Air cadets;
- Survival Instructor Course offered to air cadets;
- And all three military musician courses, offered to Sea, Army and Air Cadets within CALIXA-LAVALLÉE Company.

== Command team ==
Colonel J.L.S. Ménard is commander, and Chief Warrant Officer Éric Normand is sergeant major.

== 100th anniversary ==
In 2014, CFB Valcartier celebrated its 100th anniversary. David Johnston, then Governor General of Canada, offered a message about the role the base and its soldiers who have played in the history of Canada. Prime minister Stephen Harper also thanked the soldiers.

== CFB Valcartier newspaper ==
Adsum is a monthly newspaper for CFB Valcartier and the military community in the Quebec eastern area. The newspaper was created in 1972. It publishes 4,200 copies. The readers of the newspaper are mostly the military (active and retired) and civilians working at CFB Valcartier. The newspaper team also publishes the Military Community Guidebook - Quebec Region annually.

== Saint Jeanne d’Arc Chapel ==
The Military Ordinariate of Canada integrated a chapel which is situated at CFB Valcartier. The chapel is named Saint Jeanne d’Arc Chapel. This service is for all military persons of CFB Valcartier. The Chapel Life Coordinator is Captain Titus Ndala.

== Military Cemetery ==
CFB Valcartier Military Cemetery, opened to serve the camp in 1914, contains the graves of nine Canadian Army personnel, six from World War I and three from World War II, registered and maintained by the Commonwealth War Graves Commission.

== Economic facts ==
- CFB Valcartier's budget is $687.4 million annually. The base employs 7,700 people (6,200 military and 1,500 civilians). There are also 9,000 military reserve forces who are related to the base. Annually, the salary costs are $558 million. This sum represents half of the $1.2 billion spent on salaries by the Department of National Defence in Quebec each year. Also, the base spends $131 million locally each year.

== Contaminated water ==
In 1997, a cancer-causing chemical, trichloroethylene, was found in the water supply of CFB Valcartier and the nearby town of Shannon, Quebec. Trichloroethylene, which has been linked to liver cancer, was used for degreasing metal parts at the base for decades. The Shannon Citizens Committee (Regroupement des Citoyens de Shannon) launched a class-action lawsuit against the Department of National Defence in 2003.
