= Regional Cadet Support Unit (Eastern) =

The Regional Cadet Support Unit (Eastern) is the Canadian Forces unit that is responsible for providing support to the Canadian Cadet Organizations (Royal Canadian Sea, Army, and Air Cadets) within the province of Quebec, Canada as well as the Ottawa Valley Region. By French-Canadian and other Francophones, the unit is known as the Unité régionale de soutien aux cadets (Est) or l'URSC (Est).

The RCSU Eastern is a sub-unit of the National Cadet and Junior Rangers Support Group, which is under the authority of the Vice Chief of Defence Staff.

== Purpose ==
There are five Regional Cadet Support Units in Canada. They are:

- Regional Cadet Support Unit (Atlantic) - Supporting the Cadet Organizations within the provinces of New Brunswick, Prince Edward Island, Nova Scotia, and Newfoundland and Labrador. The commanding officer is Lieutenant Colonel Marc-Andre Watier CD;
- Regional Cadet Support Unit (Eastern) - Supporting the Cadet Organizations within the Province of Quebec and the Ottawa Valley Air Cadets units;
- Regional Cadet Support Unit (Central) - Supporting the Cadet Organizations within the Province of Ontario. The commanding officer is Lieutenant-Colonel Moise Morrissette, CD;
- Regional Cadet Support Unit (North West) - Supporting the Cadet Organizations within the Provinces of Alberta, Saskatchewan, Manitoba and Northern Ontario, northern Canadian Territories of the Yukon, the Northwest Territories, and Nunavut. The commanding officer is Lieutenant-Colonel Leo Brodeur, CD; and
- Regional Cadet Support Unit (Pacific) - Supporting the Cadet Organizations within the Province of British Columbia. The commanding officer is Commander Brad Henderson, CD.

== Commanding officer ==
The Editing Regional Cadet Support Unit (Eastern) is commanded by Lieutenant Colonel Steve Lessard, CD. (Effective September 3, 2020)

The unit was commanded by Lieutenant Colonel Serge Lapointe, CD. (From, July 6, 2017, to the September 3, 2020)

== Cadet training centres ==
RCSU Eastern also responsible for the organisation and distribution of the following Cadet Training Centres:

- Three elements Cadet Training Centre Valcartier
- Sea and Air Cadet Training Centre Bagotville
- Cadet Music Training Centre (Eastern) Mont St-Sacrement
- St Jean Cadet Flying Training Centre, Saint-Jean - however, known in French as "Centre d'entraînement en vol des cadets de St-Jean" (CEVC)

== Regional Cadet Instructor School ==
Regional Cadet Instructor School (Eastern) is the training school for officers of the Cadet Instructor Cadre within the Eastern Region. There are schools in every region of the cadet movement, including:

- RCIS (Atlantic)
- RCIS (Eastern)
- RCIS (Central)
- RCIS (North West)
- RCIS (Pacific)
