= 233rd Battalion (Canadiens-Français du Nord-Ouest), CEF =

233rd Battalion, CEF
- Active: 1916–1917
- Disbanded: 1917
- Country: Canada
- Branch: Canadian Expeditionary Force
- Type: Infantry
- Mobilization headquarters: Edmonton

Commanders
- Officer commanding: LCol Edouard Leprohon

The 233rd Battalion (Canadiens-Français du Nord-Ouest), CEF was a unit in the Canadian Expeditionary Force during the First World War. Based in Edmonton, Alberta, the unit began recruiting in early 1916 throughout western Canada. The battalion was absorbed into the 178th (Canadien-Français) Battalion, CEF in March 1917. The 233rd Battalion (Canadiens-Français du Nord-Ouest) had one officer commanding: Lieutenant-Colonel Edouard Leprohon.
