= 259th Battalion, Canadian Rifles, CEF (Siberia) =

- Active: 20 September 1918-15 November 1920
- Country: Canada
- Branch: Canadian Expeditionary Force
- Role: Infantry
- Engagements: Russian Civil War: Siberian intervention

The 259th Battalion, Canadian Rifles, CEF (Siberia), was an infantry battalion of the Canadian Siberian Expeditionary Force during the Great War.

== History ==
The 259th Battalion was authorized by CEF Routine Order 1087 on 20 September 1918 as well as by General Order 128 on 1 November 1918.

On 21 December, two companies of the battalion mutinied in the streets of Victoria, British Columbia. The mutiny occurred as the conscripts were marching from the Willows Camp to the city's Outer Wharves. Midway through the march, a platoon of troops near the rear refused to halt. Officers fired their revolvers in the air in an attempt to quell the dissent. When this failed, they ordered the obedient troops, primarily from the Ontario companies, to remove their canvas belts and whip the mutineers back into line. The march proceeded through downtown Victoria to the outer wharves, accompanied by a guard of honour of 50 troops armed with rifles and fixed bayonets. Twenty-one hours later, the SS Teesta left Victoria harbour bound for Vladivostok, with a dozen ringleaders detained in cells. While a court martial found 8 of the 9 accused guilty of "mutiny and willful disobedience", the sentences (all being some duration of hard labour, though they could have been sentenced to death) were eventually commuted by General Elmsley prior to the Canadian evacuation in early April, amid concern over the legality of deploying men under the Military Service Act for a mission tangentially connected to the "defence of the realm".

The battalion and embarked for Russia on 22 and 26 December. The unit disembarked at Vladivostok on 12 and 15 January 1919 where it served with the 16th Infantry Brigade as part of the Allied Forces in eastern Russia until 19 May. The battalion disbanded on 6 November 1920.

The 259th Battalion recruited in London and Kingston, Ontario, and Montreal and Quebec City, Quebec, and was mobilized at Victoria, British Columbia.

The 259th Battalion was commanded by Lieutenant-Colonel A.E. Swift. Major Paul Fleetford Sise served in the battalion, where he was one of the three panel members for the court martial of nine soldiers charged with mutiny (despite the fact he had no legal training.)

== Perpetuations ==
Since 25 June 1998, the 259th Battalion, Canadian Rifles, CEF (Siberia), has been perpetuated by the 12^{e} Régiment blindé du Canada.

== Battle honours ==
The 259th Battalion was awarded the battle honour SIBERIA 1918-19.

== See also ==
- List of infantry battalions in the Canadian Expeditionary Force

== Sources ==
- Canadian Expeditionary Force 1914–1919 by Col. G.W.L. Nicholson, CD, Queen's Printer, Ottawa, Ontario, 1962
