= Canadian Siberian Expeditionary Force =

Canadian military force sent to Russia during the Russian Revolution

- Corps expéditionnaire sibérien
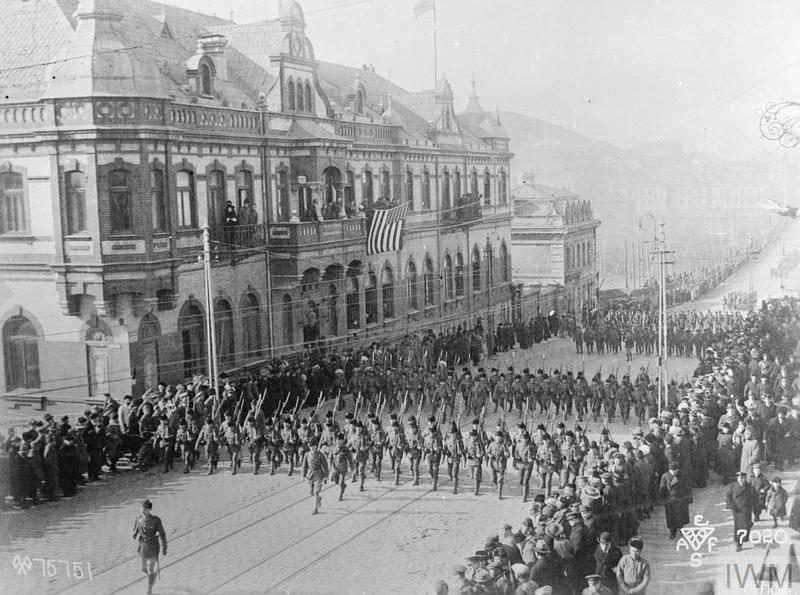
- In Vladivostok, CSEF marches in the peace parade celebrating the Western Front Armistice
- Active: August 1918–15 September 1920
- Disbanded: September 15, 1920
- Country: Canada
- Type: Expeditionary force
- Role: Suppression of the Bolshevik Revolution
- Size: 4,192 men
- Engagements: Russian Civil War: Siberian intervention

Commanders
- Commanding officer: James H. Elmsley

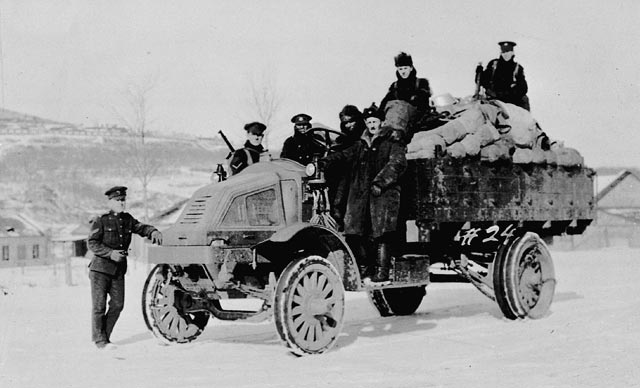
Canadian Siberian Expeditionary Force ride in a truck near Vladivostok, Jan–May 1919

The Canadian Siberian Expeditionary Force (French: Corps expéditionnaire sibérien) (also referred to as the Canadian Expeditionary Force (Siberia) or simply the CSEF) was a Canadian military force sent to Vladivostok, Russia, during the Russian Revolution to bolster the allied presence, oppose the Bolshevik Revolution and attempt to keep Russia in the fight against Germany. Composed of 4,192 soldiers and authorized in August 1918, the force returned to Canada between April and June 1919. The force was commanded by Major General James H. Elmsley. During this time, the CSEF saw little fighting, with fewer than 100 troops proceeding "up country" to Omsk, to serve as administrative staff for 1,500 British troops aiding the anti-Bolshevik White Russian government of Admiral Alexander Kolchak. Most Canadians remained in Vladivostok, undertaking routine drill and policing duties in the volatile port city.

== Background ==
Allied intervention in Siberia was driven by a mix of motivations. Prior to the Armistice of November 11, 1918, there was a genuine concern that military supplies would be used – directly or indirectly – by the Germans, and that access to the natural resources of the Russian Far East (over the Trans-Siberian Railway) could tilt the outcome of the battles on the Western Front. There was outright hostility to the Bolsheviks, particularly on the part of Winston Churchill, and national trade and (perceived) economic interests on the part of each of the governments. The case of the Czechoslovak prisoners of war, who had been offered safe passage by the Soviet government and then threatened with internment in "concentration camps" aroused sympathy on the part of many governments, particularly the United States. When the Czechoslovak troops attempted to battle their way out of Russia – eventually controlling much of the Trans-Siberian railway – various Western governments chose to intervene.

Canadian involvement in the Siberian campaign was to a significant degree driven by the policy of Canadian Prime Minister Robert Borden towards the United Kingdom. As a dominion, Canada was neither a full-fledged member of the Entente, nor simply a colony. Borden's arguments for Canada's involvement "had little to do with Siberia per se, and much to do with adding to the British government's sense of obligation to their imperial junior partner". According to Gaddis Smith, Canadian intervention "represents the initial episode in the Canadian struggle for complete control over her foreign policy after World War I. As such, it illustrates the changing relationships within the British Empire more realistically than the scores of constitutional documents that the Commonwealth statesmen self-consciously drafted between 1917 and 1931."

Domestically, the Siberian expedition was presented to the public as a trade and economic opportunity. After the Armistice, however, domestic opinion turned against foreign involvement, particularly with conscript troops.

=== Trade and business ===
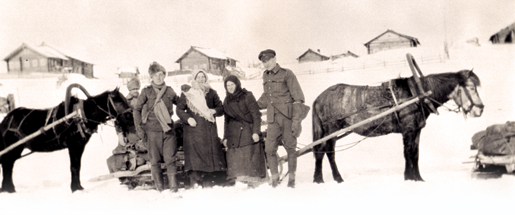
Two Canadian gunners pose alongside Russian sleigh drivers.

The belief that the Bolshevik revolution would be unsuccessful and lead to business and trade opportunities led the Canadian government to appoint the Canadian Siberian Economic Commission in an October 1918 order-in-council, led by trade commissioner Dana Wilgress. The Royal Bank of Canada opened a banking branch in Vladivostok; three employees, and a "57 ton prefabricated bank building were dispatched from Vancouver for Siberia on November 28, 1918". The prefab bank building was not used, however, and the branch was closed in October 1919, after the withdrawal of the Canadian and British troops.

== Support and opposition in Canada ==
The force was authorized by the Privy Council in early August 1918 after Borden's agreement to support the deployment. The departure of the troops was further delayed by unsuccessful attempts to raise a volunteer force, and there were mutinous events in Victoria prior to departure. There was strong criticism of the campaign from labour and the public, including farmers in the prairie provinces, and from the Toronto Globe newspaper.

== Arrival and disposition in Vladivostok ==
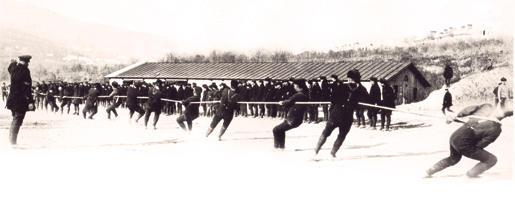
The CSEF engages in a tug of war in 1919.

Under General James H. Elmsley's command, the advance party of Canadian troops left Vancouver aboard the RMS Empress of Japan, reaching Vladivostok on October 26, 1918. The general quickly secured base headquarters at the Pushkinsky Theatre, an ornate building in the centre of the city that housed the Vladivostok Cultural-Educational Society. The unilateral Canadian action provoked a strong protest from leading Vladivostok businessmen, who demanded that Elmsley vacate the premises. The Canadians were quartered at three main sites: the East Barracks, at the head of Golden Horn Bay, the former Czarist barracks at Gornestai (today the town of Shitovaya), and the Second River Barracks north of Vladivostok. The main body of the CSEF arrived in Vladivostok in mid-January 1919, aboard the ships Teesta and Protesilaus. The Teesta's departure from Victoria on 21 December 1918 had been delayed by a mutiny of two companies of mainly French-Canadian troops in the 259th Battalion; the Protesilaus also faced difficulties reaching Vladivostok, losing a propeller off the Russian coast when it got stuck in the ice.

== Victoria mutiny of December 1918 ==
On December 21, 1918, two companies of troops in the 259th Battalion (Canadian Rifles), mutinied in the streets of Victoria, British Columbia. The mutiny occurred as the conscripts were marching from the Willows Camp to the city's Outer Wharves. Midway through the march, a platoon of troops near the rear refused to halt. Officers fired their revolvers in the air in an attempt to quell the dissent. When this failed, they ordered the obedient troops, primarily from the Ontario companies, to remove their canvas belts and whip the mutineers back into line. The march proceeded through downtown Victoria to the outer wharves, accompanied by a guard of honour of 50 troops armed with rifles and fixed bayonets. Twenty-one hours later, the SS Teesta left Victoria harbour bound for Vladivostok, with a dozen ringleaders detained in cells. While a court martial found eight of the nine accused guilty of "mutiny and willful disobedience", the sentences (all being some duration of hard labour, though they could have been sentenced to death) were eventually commuted by General Elmsley prior to the Canadian evacuation in early April, amid concern over the legality of deploying men under the Military Service Act, 1917, for a mission tangentially connected to the "defence of the realm".

== Graves and memorials: Churkin Naval Cemetery ==
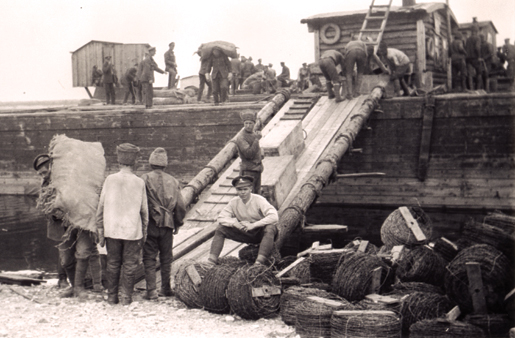
A Canadian gunner (seated) supervises the loading of a barge by prisoners.

The Commonwealth War Graves Commission site, part of the Churkin Naval Cemetery (known in Russian as the "Morskoe" or Maritime Cemetery on the Churkin Peninsula in Vladivostok), contains the graves of 14 Canadians alongside British, French, Czechoslovak and Japanese troops who died during the Siberian Intervention and a monument to Allied soldiers buried in various locations in Siberia. The same section contains a memorial to the ten British and three Canadian soldiers whose graves are found in other parts of Siberia. The Australian honorary consul at that time is also interred there.

During the Soviet period, this site was largely unmaintained. In 1996, a Canadian squadron of warships visited Vladivostok; during the visit, sailors from HMCS Protecteur, assisted by members of the Russian Navy, replaced headstones and generally repaired the graves of Canadians buried in a local cemetery.

== Departure ==
Canadian labour unions in Canada's four largest cities – Montreal, Toronto, Winnipeg and Vancouver – were sympathetic to the Soviets in Russia and started to pressure the Canadian government to leave Russia. When the main force of Canadians arrived in Russia in January 1919 it was decided to bring them home. The government refused to allow them to move to the front where they would come into conflict with the Soviets, so they stayed in Vladivostok. Even there they were not safe as Soviet partisans started to attack Allied forces in the port city. Canadians were ordered to arm themselves at all times. The Canadians dedicated a monument to the 19 Canadians who died in Russia on June 1, 1919. On June 5, 1919, the remaining Canadians boarded the SS Monteagle and sailed for Victoria, ending the Canadian presence in Russia.

== See also ==
- List of states and regions involved in the Russian Civil War
- Bibliography of the Russian Revolution and Civil War
- Outline of the Russian Revolution and Civil War
- Captain Royce Coleman Dyer was the Canadian commander of Dyer's Battalion, a unit in the North Russia Intervention
- Allied intervention in the Russian Civil War
- North Russia Intervention
- Russian Civil War
