= Ukrainization in the 1920s and 1930s =

An ethnolinguistic map showing subdivisions of the Russian Empire using data obtained from the 1897 census. Predominantly Ukrainian-speaking areas

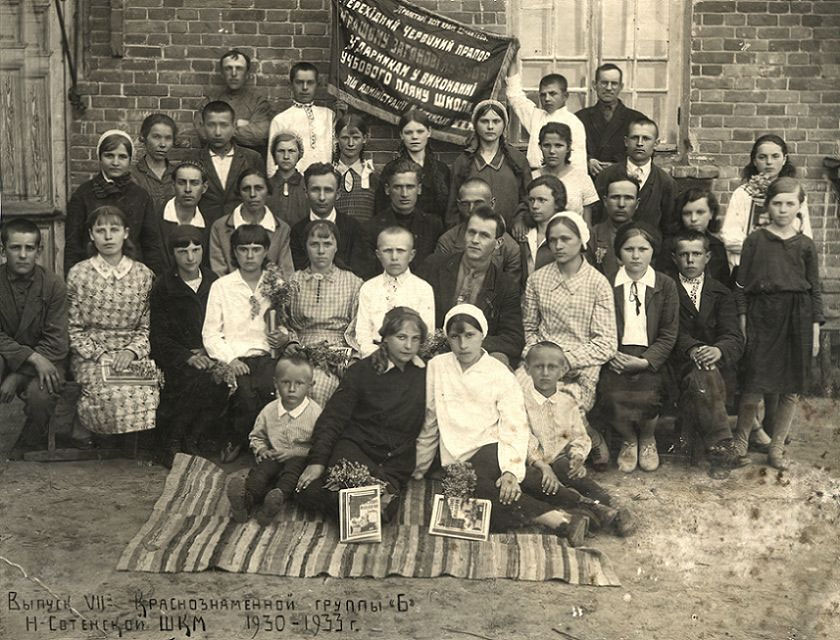
Ukrainian school in the sloboda of Nova Sotnya ("New Hundred") in Eastern Sloboda Ukraine, Russian SFSR, 1933

Ukrainization in the 1920s and 1930s was a policy of Ukrainization (Ukrainisation) by the Communist Party of the Soviet Union (initially named "Russian Communist Party (Bolsheviks)"), aimed at neutralising the aspirations of the Ukrainian people towards independence (as they briefly enjoyed during the Ukrainian People's Republic, 1917–1921), and strengthening Bolshevik power in the Ukrainian SSR in the interwar period. It envisaged the use of national personnel in Soviet, party and public institutions and organisations, the expansion of the Communist Party's ideological influence on Ukrainian society through the use of the Ukrainian language and the promotion of ‘proletarian elements’ in national culture.

The interwar Soviet policy of Ukrainization was an integral part of the Korenizatsiia policy, proclaimed by the 12th Congress of the Russian Communist Party (Bolsheviks) in 1923, as the official political course after the formation of the unitary USSR, and the factual elimination of the international legal personality of the national republics.

Soviet "Ukrainisation" differed significantly from the previous Ukrainisation policies and practices of the Ukrainian Central Rada, the Ukrainian State, and the Directory of the Ukrainian People's Republic, as well as from the Ukrainisation measures resorted to by the national-democratic forces during the period of Tsarist Russia's existence.

During the Tsarist era, the struggle for the Ukrainian national cause was mainly fought in the cultural sphere: for schools with Ukrainian as the language of instruction, Ukrainian-language printing, etc. Ukrainian national governments used the term "Ukrainisation" to refer to the processes of "derussification," the return of the people to their native language and culture, their own historical traditions and, most importantly, their own statehood.

The Soviet policy of "Ukrainisation" was one of the means of strengthening power for the Bolshevik leadership, rather than the goal of their activities. It did not envisage the development of Ukrainian culture on the basis of universal human values or the creation of a sovereign Ukrainian state. The imperial state was not a driving force behind the Ukrainian national revival of the 1920s.

Mykola Skrypnyk was particularly active in promoting "Ukrainisation", as was Oleksandr Shumsky.

== Reasons for Ukrainisation ==
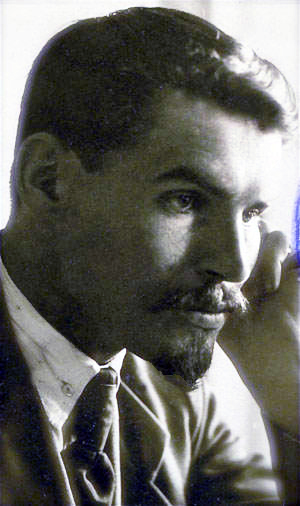
Oleksandr Shumsky

The main reason for Soviet "indigenisation" was the Bolsheviks' attempt to win over the Ukrainian masses to their side, since during the Ukrainian–Soviet War of 1917–1921, most Ukrainians preferred national slogans. The national liberation movement continued to exist underground after the end of the war, threatening to break out into the open. Among the reasons that forced the Bolsheviks to make significant national concessions were economic ones.

The introduction of "war communism" returned the country to the days of the so-called natural economy, resulting in the degradation of the economic system. To save the situation, the New Economic Policy was announced in 1921. In Ukraine, which played a significant role in supplying food to the central regions of Russia, trade replaced the centralised supply system. Therefore, the authorities needed to calm the peasantry, which had been stirred up by the events of 1917–1920 and was the main producer of food.

Foreign policy circumstances also played a significant role in the transition to the implementation of reforms in the sphere of national policy. Hopes for a world revolution diminished as the international situation stabilised. Therefore, attention was focused on national liberation movements that could lead to revolutionary situations in capitalist countries. In addition, given that part of the territories inhabited by Ukrainians were part of Poland, Czechoslovakia and Romania, the Soviet government was not opposed to using the Ukrainian population as a revolutionary element.

A certain role in changing Bolshevik tactics on the national question was played by the fact that its fair resolution was one of the basic tenets of Marxism. Since the USSR was seen by millions of people as the embodiment of Marxist views, ignoring the national question for too long would mean losing its attractive image. The transition to a policy of "indigenisation" was also part of a compromise on the creation of a unitary Soviet state – the USSR. Without granting political and economic rights to the republics, the central government only made concessions in the national-cultural sphere.

Among the reasons for Ukrainisation officially announced in the party and Soviet press was an attempt to bring the Russified city closer to the Ukrainian village, to establish closer ties between the working class and the peasantry, and thus to promote the stability of Ukrainian society, which was a necessary prerequisite for building a "communist future." Subjective factors also played an important role. A number of central government leaders speculated on the national question. During internal party struggles, they tried to win over the Bolsheviks of the national republics, primarily the Ukrainian ones.

Having emerged as a necessity due to certain circumstances, "Ukrainisation" determined the course of its development. It was programmed to be implemented within certain limits, beyond which it was classified as "bourgeois nationalism". However, under the influence of the national-cultural movement, which encompassed millions of people and which it itself empowered and supported with certain legal guarantees, the policy of "Ukrainisation" went beyond its intended limits. The national-cultural movement became a catalyst for Soviet "Ukrainisation," pushing the state apparatus and the Communist Party to implement Ukrainisation measures. In the 1920s, two forms of "Ukrainisation" emerged in the Ukrainian SSR – official and popular – which took place in parallel and influenced each other. The official one was described by the party leadership as "Bolshevik," while the popular one was described as "Petliuran".

The policy of "Ukrainisation" contradicted the imperial ambitions of the All-Union Communist Party (Bolsheviks), but was forced by the hostile attitude towards Soviet power on the part of Ukrainians, whose national consciousness had grown over the previous decades, and especially as a result of the national revolution of 1917–1920, as well as the threat of intervention by Poland, supported by the Entente. Given these dangers (similar to those in other republics), the All-Union Communist Party (Bolsheviks) was forced to make concessions to national movements, primarily the Ukrainian one, and after the first years of openly imperialist policies, in a series of congress resolutions, 4 conferences, it recognised the finality of introducing the native languages of the national republics in schools and administration, while simultaneously increasing the proportion of local personnel in all areas of the economy and culture. As a result of this policy change, on 27 July 1923, the Council of People's Commissars issued a decree "On measures for the Ukrainisation of school, educational and cultural institutions," according to which the Ukrainian language was to be introduced in all types of schools with specific deadlines for their "Ukrainisation."

The second decree, adopted by the All-Ukrainian Central Executive Committee and the Council of People's Commissars of the Ukrainian SSR on 1 August 1923, "On measures for the equality of languages and assistance in the development of the Ukrainian language," required the introduction of the Ukrainian language at all levels of government. However, both of these decrees (although adopted on the basis of resolutions of the 12th Congress of the RCP(b) (17–24 April 1923), at which representatives of the national republics raised the national question very sharply) met with resistance within the Communist Party (Bolsheviks) of Ukraine (CP(b)U), where Ukrainians were a minority at the time (the CP(b)U was then composed predominantly of Russians and persons of other nationalities). More intensive "Ukrainisation" began only in 1925, when, under pressure from the Ukrainian part of the CPU(b)U, the secretaries of its Central Committee E. Kviring and D. Lebed, who had previously openly opposed any concessions to Ukrainian culture, were removed from their posts as secretaries of its Central Committee.

In April 1925, the Central Committee of the Communist Party (Bolsheviks) of Ukraine adopted a resolution on "Ukrainisation", which stated that "the task of strengthening the alliance between the working class and the peasantry and consolidating the dictatorship of the proletariat in Ukraine requires the entire party to make every effort to master the Ukrainian language and promote Ukrainisation...". On 30 April 1925, the All-Ukrainian Central Executive Committee and the Council of People's Commissars of the Ukrainian SSR adopted a joint resolution on measures for the urgent implementation of the complete "Ukrainisation" of the Soviet apparatus, and the plenum of the Central Committee of the Communist Party (Bolsheviks) of Ukraine on 30 May passed a resolution on the "Ukrainisation" of the party and professional apparatus and Soviet institutions. The main role in the subsequent implementation of "Ukrainisation" was played by the People's Commissariat of Education (which at that time also oversaw all areas of culture), headed until 1926 by Oleksandr Shumsky, and after his removal Mykola Skrypnyk. The secretary of the Central Commission for Ukrainisation of the Council apparatus under the Council of People's Commissars of the Ukrainian SSR was Anton Prykhodko.

== Ukrainisation of the workforce and population ==
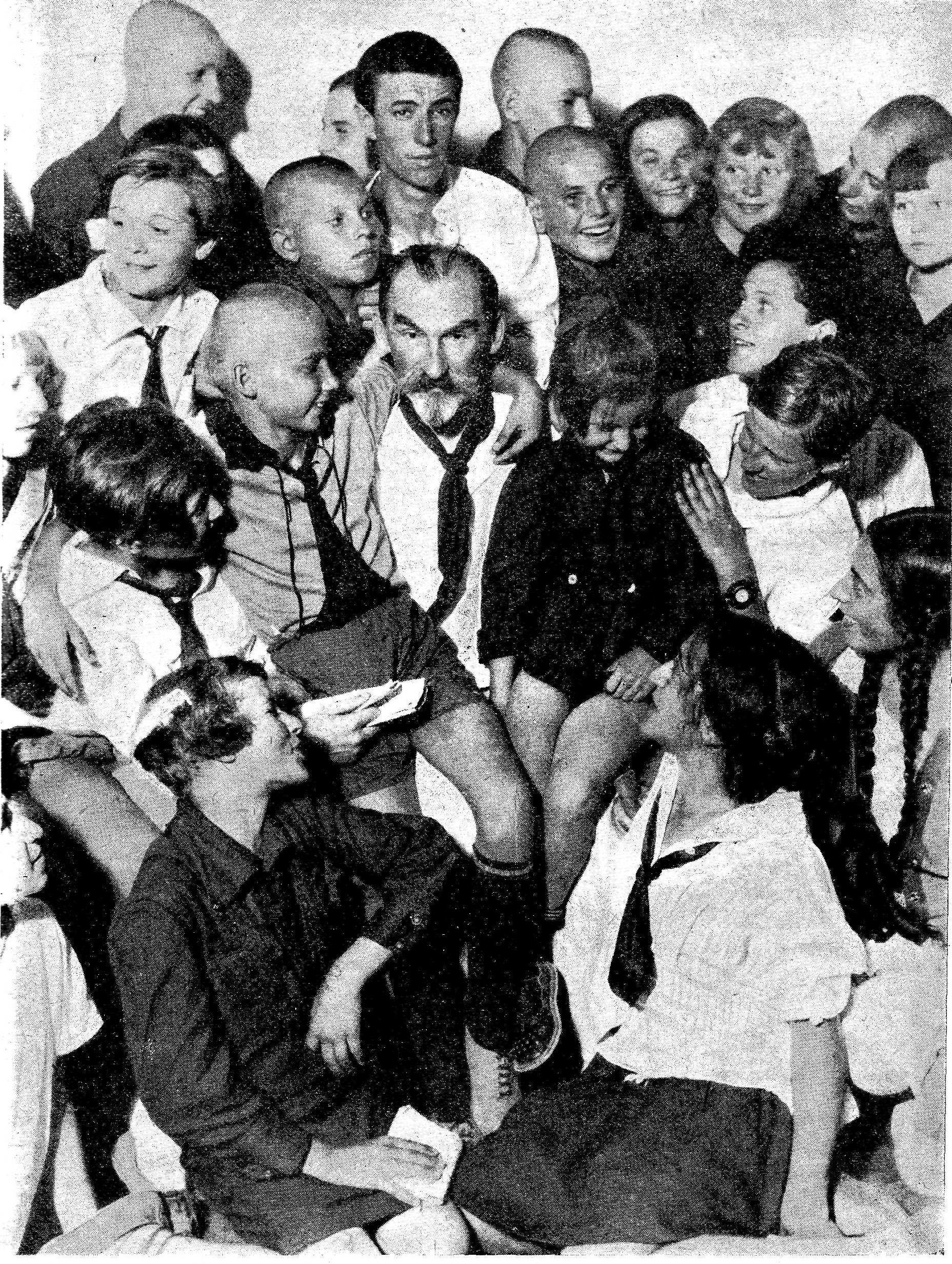
"Pioneer of Bolshevism in Ukraine, Comrade M. O. Skrypnyk, together with other pioneers." Photo from Universal Magazine, 1929.

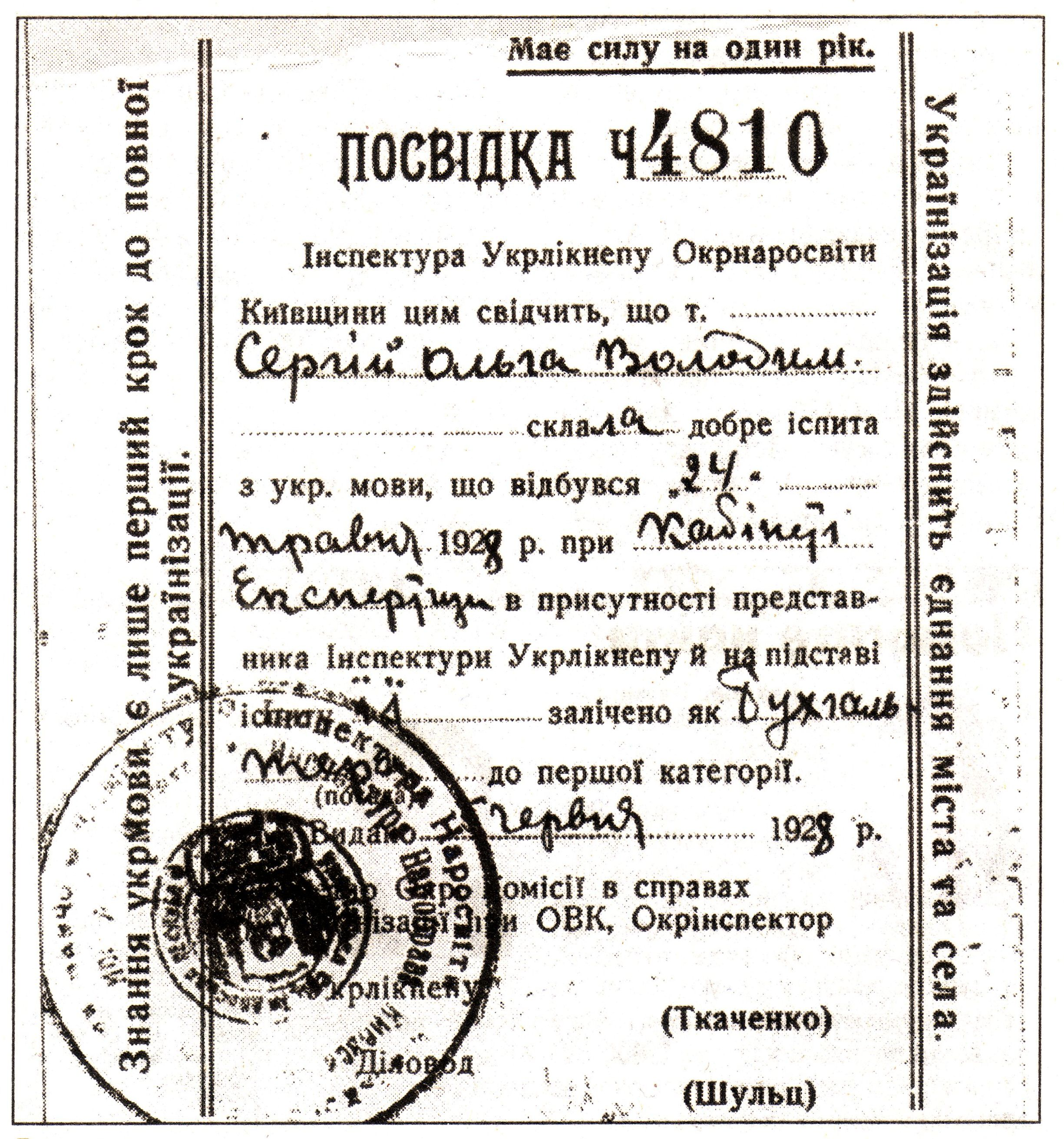
Certificate confirming that an accountant passed exams in the Ukrainian language, without which they would not be hired. Kyiv Oblast, 1928. Inscriptions: "Ukrainisation will unite the city and the village" and "Knowledge of the Ukrainian language is only the first step towards complete Ukrainisation". The recipient's surname has also been Ukrainised.

In a relatively short period of time, significant changes took place as a result of "Ukrainisation": thanks to Ukrainisation measures (in conjunction with other socio-economic processes) in schools, cultural institutions, the press, etc., and the influx of Ukrainian population from villages and towns, the Ukrainian SSR began to take on a Ukrainian character. Particularly noticeable changes in the national composition of the population and the use of the Ukrainian language took place in large industrial cities. From 1923 to 1933, the number of Ukrainians in Kharkiv increased from 38% to 50%, in Kyiv from 27.1% to 42.1%, in Dnipro from 16% to 48%, in Odesa from 6.6% to 17.4%, and in Luhansk from 7% to 31%.

As a result of this process, changes also took place in the national composition of the workforce. The total number of 1.1 million workers in the Ukrainian SSR in 1926 was divided by nationality as follows: 55% Ukrainians (4% of the total Ukrainian population), 29% Russians (25% of their total population), 9% Jews (15% of their total population) and 7% others. However, only 42% of the total number of Ukrainian workers were employed in industry in cities, with the rest working in agriculture, transport, etc. The situation was somewhat better on the railways, where 69% were Ukrainians, half of whom spoke Ukrainian (in industry, only 22%).

By 1931, the number of workers in Ukraine had grown to 1.9 million, of whom 58.6% were Ukrainians (including approximately 32% who spoke Ukrainian), 24.6% were Russians, and 12.2% were Jews. By 1933, Ukrainians already accounted for 60% of the workforce (53% in heavy industry, 46% among miners, 45% in metallurgy, 51% in the chemical industry, 77% in iron ore mining, on the railways 77%, in agriculture and mechanical engineering 60%, in the production of building materials 68%). The use of the Ukrainian language among workers, for example in metallurgy, increased on average from 18% in 1927 to 42% in 1930. The "Ukrainisation" of the working class and urban population in connection with industrialisation and collectivisation (from which the peasantry fled to the cities) accelerated in 1927–1933, but this was already by the end of the "Ukrainisation" policy.

Migration processes had a significant impact on the implementation of the Soviet Ukrainisation programme. The New Economic Policy (NEP), as a policy aimed at rebuilding the economy, led to an increase in the migration of the rural Ukrainian-speaking population to cities, which contributed to the derussification of the latter. In the process of rapid cultural development, a tendency towards intolerance of centralisation and unification of cultural life began to form, one of the most striking examples of which was M. Khvylovy's slogan "Away from Moscow!"

"Ukrainisation" contributed to the acceleration of the elimination of illiteracy, which decreased from 47% in 1926 to 8% in 1934. Primary education (including seven-year schools) was Ukrainised from 80% in 1926 to 88.5% in 1933. The "Ukrainisation" of secondary (vocational) education and higher education institutions proceeded more slowly: from 19% in 1923 to 28.5% in 1926 and 69% in 1929. At the National Academy of Sciences of Ukraine, the Russian language was not used at all from the time of its foundation in November 1918 until the turn towards Russification in the early 1930s.

Official documents emphasised that "Ukrainisation" should not be limited to language alone, but should encompass the cultural process as a whole and lead to the mastery of Ukrainian by personnel in all areas of the country's economic and cultural life. As a result of 10 years of "Ukrainisation" (1923–1933), Ukrainian literature, art, theatre (in 1931, of all 88 theatres, 66 were Ukrainian, 12 were Jewish, and 9 were Russian), cinema, despite ideological obstacles, underwent significant development, and this period is often referred to as an era of cultural revival.

The Ukrainian press and publishing houses contributed greatly to the "Ukrainisation" of Russified cities. While there were almost no Ukrainian-language newspapers in 1922, by 1933 there were 373 (out of a total of 426) with a circulation of 3.6 million copies, 89% of the total number of periodicals in Ukraine (by 1926, the press was 60% Ukrainianised). In 1933, there were 89 magazines in Ukrainian out of a total of 118, while book production was 83% Ukrainianised.

== Ukrainisation of the state apparatus ==
The indicators of the "Ukrainisation" of the state apparatus were quite varied: in 1934, 50.3% of the members of the All-Ukrainian Central Executive Committee were Ukrainians, 25.4% were Russians, and 14.7% were Jews. Approximately the same ratio was observed in the oblasts; in district executive committees, respectively, 68.8%, 13.6%, and 10%; in city councils, 56.1%, 23.2%, and 15.2%; in village councils, 86.1%, 5.7%, and 2.2%. The staff of the central apparatus of the people's commissariats were Ukrainised by 70–95%; the oblast apparatus by 50%, the district apparatus by 64%; the people's courts by 62%; the police by 58%; and cooperatives by 70%. The slowest "Ukrainisation" took place in the Communist Party (Bolsheviks) of Ukraine (CP(B)U) itself, which in the early years of Soviet power was largely foreign. The change in its national composition can be seen in the table:

Year	CP(B)U members and candidates	Ukrainians	Russians	Other (Jews)
1922	54 818	23.3%	53.6%	23.3%
1924	57 016	33.3%	45.1%	14.0%
1925	101 852	36.9%	43.4%	19.7%
1927	168 087	51.9%	30.0%	18.1%
1930	270 698	52.9%	29.3%	17.8%
1933	468 793	60.0%	23.0%	17.0%

The Central Committee of the Communist Party of Ukraine (CPU) became Ukrainianised even more slowly. In 1924, only 16% of its members were Ukrainian; in 1925 it was 25%, and in 1930 it was 43%. The Komsomol was much more successful in its Ukrainisation, which can be explained by the mass nature of this organisation, which grew largely at the expense of the peasantry: in 1925, 58.7% of its members were Ukrainians, in 1932 it was 72%, but by 1929 only 33% in the Central Committee of the LKSMU.

== Ukrainisation of the cultural sphere ==
Between 1923 and 1929, Ukrainian publishers switched to publishing almost exclusively Ukrainian-language books; 85% of the press became Ukrainianised. The best theatre venues were transferred to Ukrainian theatres, and Russian theatre effectively ceased to exist in Ukraine.

== Ukrainisation of oblasts in Russia ==
Under active pressure from the Communist Party (Bolsheviks) of Ukraine in the 1920s and early 1930s, the Kuban Oblast, Don Oblast (now Rostov Oblast), Stavropol Oblast, part of the North Caucasus, Kursk and Voronezh oblasts of the Russian Soviet Federative Socialist Republic underwent "Ukrainisation". By order, schools, organisations, enterprises, and newspapers were transferred to teaching and communication in the Ukrainian language.

== Achievements ==
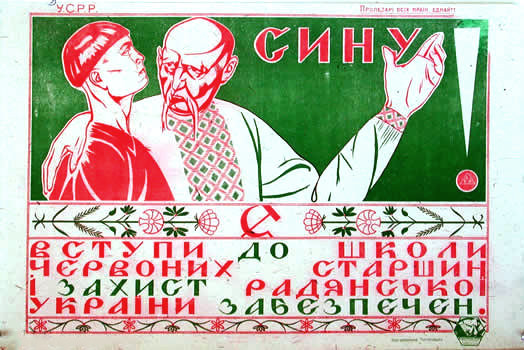
1921 poster in the Ukrainian language: "Son! Enroll in the School of Red Army Commanders, and the defence of Soviet Ukraine will be ensured." This poster is frequently cited as a visual example of Korenizatsiia, and more specifically, the 1920s Soviet policy of Ukrainization.

From the perspective of the policy's stated goals, one of the temporary positive features of "Ukrainisation" was the consolidation of some of the achievements Ukrainian Revolution of 1917–1921, the strengthening of the position of Ukrainians in the city, in particular due to the influx of rural populations, for whom "Ukrainisation" made it easier to settle in the city. Also positive were attempts (on the initiative of Mykola Skrypnyk) to spread Ukrainisation beyond the borders of the Ukrainian SSR to ethnographically Ukrainian territories of the Russian Soviet Federative Socialist Republic (Kursk, Voronezh, Saratov, Kuban, Kazakhstan), in particular in an attempt to introduce Ukrainian-language schooling, press, a supply of Ukrainian literature, etc., as well as (albeit less successful) attempts to "Ukrainise" the army, including the School of Red Officers in Kharkiv, and the newspaper "Українське Військо" "Ukrainian Army". The Ukrainian Military District published the newspaper "Червона Армія" ("Red Army") from 1919 to 1925 in Russian, and then from 1925 until 1938 in Ukrainian.

Ukrainisation was actively pursued in the Kuban, Don, Armavir, Tver, Maykop, Selskaya, Stavropol, and other oblasts of the RSFSR. Ukrainian reading rooms, clubs, literacy schools, and workers' faculties were opened here. A Ukrainian pedagogical technical school was opened in Kursk. The number of children studying in the languages of national minorities was much greater than the number of those studying in Russian. The Ukrainian language confidently began to occupy a leading position without oppressing others. A sign of understanding the importance of the national question during "Ukrainisation" was the tolerant attitude towards national minorities in Ukraine (Jews, Poles, Germans, Moldovans/Romanians and others) and the protection of their rights in local administration, schools, the press, theatre, etc.

Given all the positive aspects of "Ukrainisation," the Ukrainian intelligentsia generally approved and supported it, although, especially in academic (the National Academy of Sciences of Ukraine) and literary (the VAPLITE, neoclassicist, Lanka-MARS) circles, perceived it as "only a partial satisfaction of the natural rights of the Ukrainian people, and even warned from the very beginning about the danger of the revival of Russian imperialism and Russification"

== Resistance and collapse ==
The policy of "Ukrainisation" began to be rolled back after the Bolshevik nomenclature had trained national personnel and eradicated the national opposition and "national deviants" in the Communist Party (Bolsheviks) of Ukraine. As a result of the bureaucratic approach, "Ukrainisation" primarily affected the administrative sphere (personnel policy and record keeping), but was not implemented in mass cultural and educational activities.

Some Great Russian chauvinists in Moscow and Leningrad were hostile towards the policy of Ukrainisation. The majority of members of the Communist Party (Bolsheviks) of Ukraine were indifferent or even hostile to "Ukrainisation", with only "a thin film of Ukrainian communists floating on the surface of the turbulent stream of Ukrainian cultural revival" (Oleksandr Shumsky); among the latter, former Borotbists (see Ukrainian Party of Socialist-Revolutionaries-Borotbists (Communists)), Mykola Khvylovy and Mykola Skrypnyk with their followers. Ukrainians from western Ukraine who remained in the Ukrainian SSR after the defeat of the Ukrainian revolution of 1917–1920 or who arrived (mainly from Galicia) later, driven, on the one hand, by Poland's anti-Ukrainian policy and, on the other, inspired by their belief in the revival of a sovereign Ukraine in the then Ukrainian SSR.

== End ==
Moscow closely monitored the process of Ukraine's cultural revival. Fearing the strengthening of tendencies towards its independence, the All-Union Party began to slow down Ukrainisation after its inception. A letter from 1926 by Joseph Stalin to Lazar Kaganovich warning against the "deviation" of Mykola Khvylovy, who had launched the slogan "Away from Moscow" and sought the complete "Ukrainisation" of the proletariat. The same year, in May 1926, Oleksandr Shumsky was forced to apologise for his criticism of Kaganovich, who had accused Shumsky of spreading anti-Russian sentiments in Ukraine. In 1927, amid heated debates between Shumskists and Stalinists, Shumsky was removed from office, and eventually compelled to leave Ukraine. In 1928–1929 followed the liquidation of the literary organisations VAPLITE and Lanka-MARS, later the magazines "Літературний ярмарок" ("Literary Fair") and Prolitfront, the persecution of neoclassicists; the liquidation of the Ukrainian Autocephalous Orthodox Church (1919–1937), the subordination of the All-Ukrainian Academy of Sciences (1934–1936); the exile of Mykhailo Hrushevsky to Moscow (1931), and so on. The "Ukrainisation" process was finally halted with the appointment of Pavel Postyshev as secretary of the Central Committee of the Communist Party (Bolsheviks) of Ukraine in January 1933.

In the early 1930s, the methods of implementing the policy of "Ukrainisation" were changed. In the context of the crisis, which forced the Kremlin to halt another communist assault, the authorities refused to cooperate with supporters of national and cultural revival. The main danger to the All-Union Communist Party (Bolsheviks) was declared to be "bourgeois nationalism" and, above all, "Ukrainian bourgeois nationalism". Processes in the national sphere that were undesirable for the Moscow leadership were classified as "Petliuran Ukrainisation". In 1932, "Ukrainisation" outside the Ukrainian SSR was stopped. In the Ukrainian SSR, it continued, but was accompanied by a struggle against "Skrypnykism." The campaign against "Skrypnykism" was proclaimed a struggle against "nationalism" and "Petliurism." A course was taken to implement exclusively "Bolshevik Ukrainisation." National and cultural processes came under the complete control of the All-Union Communist Party (Bolsheviks). The processes of "rooting" power in the Ukrainian SSR continued. In 1937, Ukrainians made up 60% of the Communist Party (Bolsheviks) of Ukraine.

At the end of the 1930s, the authorities finally broke with "Ukrainisation". The latter, as a temporary tactical step to strengthen the position of the Communist Party in Ukraine, had already served its purposes. The Soviet authorities firmly controlled all spheres of life, and "Ukrainisation" hindered the further centralisation and unification of the USSR. Therefore, reverse processes began: the policy of Russification of Ukraine gained strength.

== See also ==
- Russification of Ukraine
- Derussification in Ukraine
- Belarusization
- Russians in Ukraine
- Ukrainization
- Language policy in Ukraine
- Latinisation in the Soviet Union
  - Ukrainian Latin alphabet § 20th century
- Ukrainians in Siberia
- Green Ukraine
- Grey Ukraine
- Yellow Ukraine
- Pink Ukraine
- Population transfer in the Soviet Union
- Deportation of the Crimean Tatars
- June deportation (Baltic states 1941)

== Sources ==
Ukrainian Wikiquote has quotations related to: Українізація (1920—1930–ті)

- Українізація // Енциклопедія українознавства [Encyclopedia of Ukrainian Studies] : Словникова частина [Vocabulary section]: [в 11 т.] / Shevchenko Scientific Society; ed. Arkady Ilarionovych Zhukovskyj. Paris/New York: Молоде життя [Young Life], 1995. Book 2, [т. 11] : Доповнення і виправлення. pp. 3327–3329. ISBN 5-7707-4049-3.
- Культурне будівництво в Українській РСР (1917—1927): Зб. док. . Kyiv, 1979.
- Культурне будівництво в Українській РСР: Важливіші рішення Комуністичної партії і Радянського уряду. Кyiv, 1959. — Т. 1.
- Українознавство. Хрестоматія. — К., 1997. — Т. 2.
- Боровик А. Українізація загальноосвітніх шкіл за часів виборювання державності (1917—1920 рр.). Chernihiv: КП "Видавництво «Чернігівські обереги», 2008. 368 с.
- Хвильовий М. Україна чи Малоросія? [Ukraine or Little Russia?] // Вітчизна. — 1990. — № 1–2.
- Даниленко В. М. Українізація: здобутки і втрати (20-30-ті рр.). Проблеми історії України: факти, судження, пошуки: міжвідомчий зб. матеріалів наук. пр. Kyiv, 1992. Вип. 2. С. 79–91.
- Резолюція ЦК КП(б)У про підсумки українізації // Вісті ВУЦУВК. 19 April 1927. Доступно з: http://oldnewspapers.com.ua/node/413
- Чубарь. В. Я. Доповідь на Пленумі ЦК КП(б)У про українізацію. 6–8 October 1924. Доступно з: www.hai-nyzhnyk.in.ua/doc2/1924(10)6-8.ukrainizaciya.php
- Гандкін. Українізація районів Кубані. 20 July 1930. Доступно з: http://www.hai-nyzhnyk.in.ua/doc2/1930(07)20.kuban.php
- Телегуз І. Особливості створення шкільних підручників в Радянській Україні у 1921—1934 рр. Наукові записки Кіровоградського державного педагогічного університету імені Володимира Винниченка. Серія: Історичні науки. 2012. Вип. 15. С. 127—134.

== Literature ==
- Тези ЦК КП(б)У про підсумки українізації. Видання ЦК КПЗУ. Lviv, 1926.
- УССР — Народний Комісаріат Освіти. Українізація радянських установ (декрети, інструкції і матеріали). Kharkiv, 1926–27.
- Andriy Ananiyovych Khvylya, Национальный вопрос на Украине. Kharkiv, 1926.
- Volodymyr Zatonsky, Національна проблема на Україні. Kharkiv, 1926.
- Українізація ВУЗ-ів. // Шлях освіти [The Path of Education]. 1926. Ч. 1.
- Volodymyr Zatonsky, Матеріали до українського національного питання // Більшовик України [Bolshevik Ukraine]. 1927. Ч. 6.
- Lazar Kaganovich, Українізація партії і боротьба з ухилами // Вісті ВУЦВК [Bulletin of the Central Committee of the CP(b)U]. 27 March 1927.
- Oleksandr Shumsky, Ідеологічна боротьба в українському культурному процесі // Більшовик України. 1927. Ч. 2.
- Mykola Skrypnyk, Статті і промови, тт. І, II, IV і V. X. 1929 -31. Будівництво Радянської України. Зб. Вип. І (За ленінську національну політику) і вип.II (Господарське та культурне будівництво). Kharkiv, 1929.
- Mykola Skrypnyk, Статті і промови з національного питання. Munich, 1974.
- Semyon Dimanstein, Идеологическая борьба в национальном вопросе // Революция и национальности [Revolution and Nationalities]. 1930. Ч. 3.
- Stanisław Kosior, За ленінську національну політику. Kharkiv, 1930.
- 11th Congress of the Communist Party (Bolsheviks) of Ukraine. Стенографічний звіт. Kharkiv, 1930.
- Yevgen Fedorovych Hirchak, Бойові проблеми національної культури // Більшовик України. 1931. Ч. 5.
- Хвиля А. Пролетаріат і практичне розгортання культурно-національного будівництва // Більшовик України. Ч. 13—14.
- Національне питання. Хрестоматія з методичними вказівками. Упорядник Б. Борев. Kharkiv, 1931.
- Majstrenko I. Borotbism. A Chapter in the History of Ukrainian Communism, 1954.
- Культурне будівництво в Українській РСР. Kyiv, 1959.
- Borys Ju. The Russian Communist Party and the Sovietization of Ukraine. Stockholm, 1960.
- Ivan Dziuba, Українізація та її розгром. В книзі «Інтернаціоналізм чи русифікація?». [Ukrainisation and its defeat. In the book ‘Internationalism or Russification?’]. Munich, 1968.
- Ivan Maksymovych Koshelivets, Микола Скрипник. Munich, 1972.
- Гришко В. Український націонал-комунізм на іст. пробі доби українізації (1923—1933) // Сучасність. 1978. Ч. 12.
- Чумак В. М. Політика українізації в УСРР і КПЗУ (1927—1928) // Записки історичного факультету Одеського державного університету ім. І. І. Мечникова. Odesa, 1999. Вип. 10. pp. 193–201.
