= Far Eastern Front in the Russian Civil War =

Far Eastern Front
- Part of the Eastern Front of the Russian Civil War
- The Chita White Cossack Regiment
Date	1917 - 1923
Location	Eastern Siberia, Outer Manchuria, Outer Mongolia
Result	Bolshevik Victory

Belligerents
Russian State; Eastern Okraina; Priamur Government; Japan; Mongolia; (Republic of China (1912–1949)) China; United States; Green Ukraine; Buryat-Mongolia	Russian SFSR; Far Eastern Republic; Mongolian People's Party

Commanders and leaders
Grigory Semyonov; Mikhail Diterikhs; R. von Sternberg (executed); Anatoly Pepelyayev; Viktorin Molchanov; Boris Khreschatitsky; Mikhail Pleshkov; Ivan Kalmykov †; Otani Kikuzo; Yui Mitsue; Bogd Khan; William S. Graves; Robert L. Eichelberger; Yurii Hlushko-Mova	Leon Trotsky; Mikhail Matiyasevich; Sergey Lazo (executed); Vasily Blyukher; Konstantin Neumann; Ivan Strod; Mikhail Alafuso; A. Krasnoshchyokov; Konstantin Avksentevsky; Ieronim Uborevich; Damdin Sükhbaatar; Khorloogiin Choibalsan; Dambyn Chagdarjav (executed)

During the Russian Civil War, the Far Eastern part of the former Russian Empire was a battleground for violence between the Russian SFSR and the remnants of the Russian State. The fighting in this front expanded from Outer Mongolia, through Eastern Siberia, and in the Ussuri and Amur districts of Outer Manchuria in Russia.

== Combatants ==
The fighting forces on the Communist side were the Red Army, Kuban Cossacks, Communist Mongolian militias, and the Far Eastern Republic. On the White side, there were local White Army units, pro-white Mongolian militias, Mongolian government forces, and the Beiyang Army. Allied intervention forces arrived which included 70,000 Imperial Japanese soldiers and 10,000 US Marines.

=== The Japanese goals ===
During the October Revolution, the Japanese were already gaining influence in Chinese Manchuria. They were surprised when the Bolsheviks successfully took power in Russia. While the Americans were interested in supporting Kolchak's White government, the Japanese aimed to take over Russian ports and coastal territories. In 1918, Japan occupied Vladivostok with the United States Marines. The Japanese had plans of rapid expansion starting in Amur and Ussuri River region all the way to Lake Baikal. In response to the Russians' establishment of the Far Eastern Republic, the Japanese backed the Provisional Priamurye Government.

=== The U.S. aims ===
The United States was interested in helping Admiral Kolchak's government in Siberia, which was in need of aid. They wanted to press the Red Army out of Siberia and allow the White Army to establish control of Russia and defeat the Bolsheviks. A major contributing factor was the United States government fears that communism would spread through the U.S. if the Bolsheviks won the civil war. Another major reasons were to rescue the 40,000 men of the Czechoslovak Legion, who were being held up by Bolshevik forces as they attempted to make their way along the Trans-Siberian Railroad to Vladivostok, and it was hoped, eventually to the Western Front and to protect the large quantities of military supplies and railroad rolling stock that the United States had sent to the Russian Far East in support of the Russian Empire's war efforts on the Eastern Front of World War I.

== Communist/Bolshevik response ==
The Bolshevik effort in the Far East was the same as on the other fronts: to retake or hold on to territory of the former Russian Empire. The goal of the Russian SFSR was to stop the Allied advance into Siberia. The Soviets set up the Far Eastern Republic as a buffer state to hold off the White and allied armies.

== Mongolia ==
The war expanded into Mongolia as White armies in the far east retreated. While others retreated to Japan or China, some tried to hold on to Mongolia which was a Czarist allied state. As the war dragged on, Mongolians were forced to take sides. Some joined the Communists, either by entering their armies or forming militias to help fight the Whites. Others went with the Whites, as part of the puppet government's forces or militias.

== Aftermath ==
In the aftermath, the Whites were forced into exile. The Americans left Siberia and the Russian Far East in 1920. Japan held it even after the Whites were defeated and would not withdraw until October 1922. With the war over, the Soviet government in Russia got to keep all of Russia's pre-war territories in the Far East. Future clashes over territory in the region would continue into the next decade, as seen during the Battle of Lake Khasan in 1938 and the Battles of Khalkhin Gol in 1939.

== See also ==
- Bibliography of the Russian Revolution and Civil War
- Outline of the Russian Revolution and Civil War
- Index of articles related to the Russian Revolution and Civil War
- The "Russian" Civil Wars, 1916–1926: Ten Years That Shook the World
- Russia in Flames: War, Revolution, Civil War, 1914–1921
- Russia in Revolution: An Empire in Crisis, 1890 to 1928
- Russia: Revolution and Civil War, 1917—1921
- The Russian Revolution: A New History
