= Battle of Volochayevka =

1922 battle of the Russian Civil War

- Part of the Eastern Front of the Russian Civil War
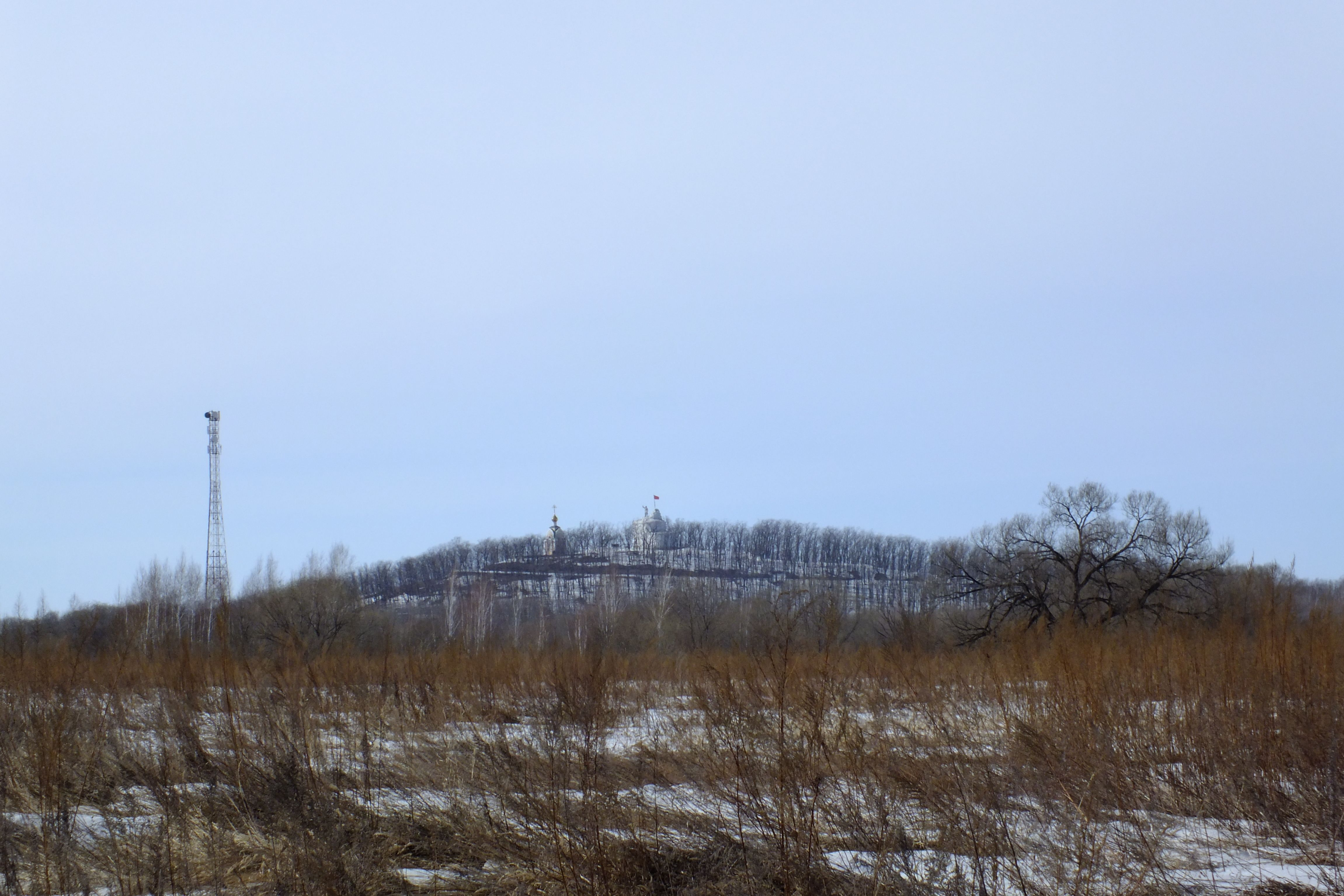
- The hill on which the battle took place.
Date	5–14 February 1922
Location	Volochayevka-1 (now Jewish Autonomous Oblast), Russia
Result	Red victory

Belligerents
Far Eastern Republic	(Russia) White movement

Commanders and leaders
(Far Eastern Republic) Vasily Blyukher	(Russia) Viktorin Molchanov

Strength
6,300 infantry 1,300 cavalry 300 machine guns 30 field guns 2 Renault FT light tanks 3 armored trains	3,850 infantry 1,100 cavalry 63 machine guns 13 field guns 3 armored trains

Casualties and losses
128 killed 800 wounded 200 frostbitten	400 killed 700 wounded

The Battle of Volochayevka was an important battle of the Far Eastern Front in the latter part of the Russian Civil War. It occurred on February 10 through 12, 1922, near Volochayevka station on the Amur Railway, on the outskirts of the city of Khabarovsk.

The People's Revolutionary Army of the Far Eastern Republic under Vasily Blyukher defeated units of the counterrevolutionary Far Eastern White Army led by Viktorin Molchanov.

== Background – November 1921 White offensive ==
In November 1921 the Far Eastern White Army launched an offensive against the Far Eastern Republic, supported by Japan, which wanted a foothold in the Russian Far East. The White army, based on Vladivostok, advanced into the north of Primorskaya Oblast, following the railroad and the Ussuri River, occupying cities, towns and villages, and capturing Khabarovsk.

On December 28, 1921, the Whites suffered their first check at a battle 110 kilometres (68 mi) west of Khabarovsk and retreated to Volochayevka and fortified themselves in a position based on Ju-Quran hill. Throughout January 1922 the two armies skirmished and fought in this area.

== Battle ==
At dawn on February 10, 1922, in severe cold and deep snow, Blyukher's Red Army attacked the White positions. The Reds had 7,600 soldiers with hundreds of machine guns and 30 field guns, and two light machine-gun tanks. The White Army had 4,950 soldiers equipped with 13 guns and many fewer automatic weapons.

The Red attack of February 10 was repulsed with heavy losses. One of the Red tanks was knocked out and the other broke down. Those who were wounded died quickly in the cold −30 °C (−22 °F) temperature. Blyukher regrouped on February 11, and then attacked again on February 12. This time, the 3rd and 6th Regiments broke through the wire and after fierce fighting the Reds captured Ju-Quran hill around noon. This rendered the White position untenable, and Molchanov retreated.

== Aftermath ==
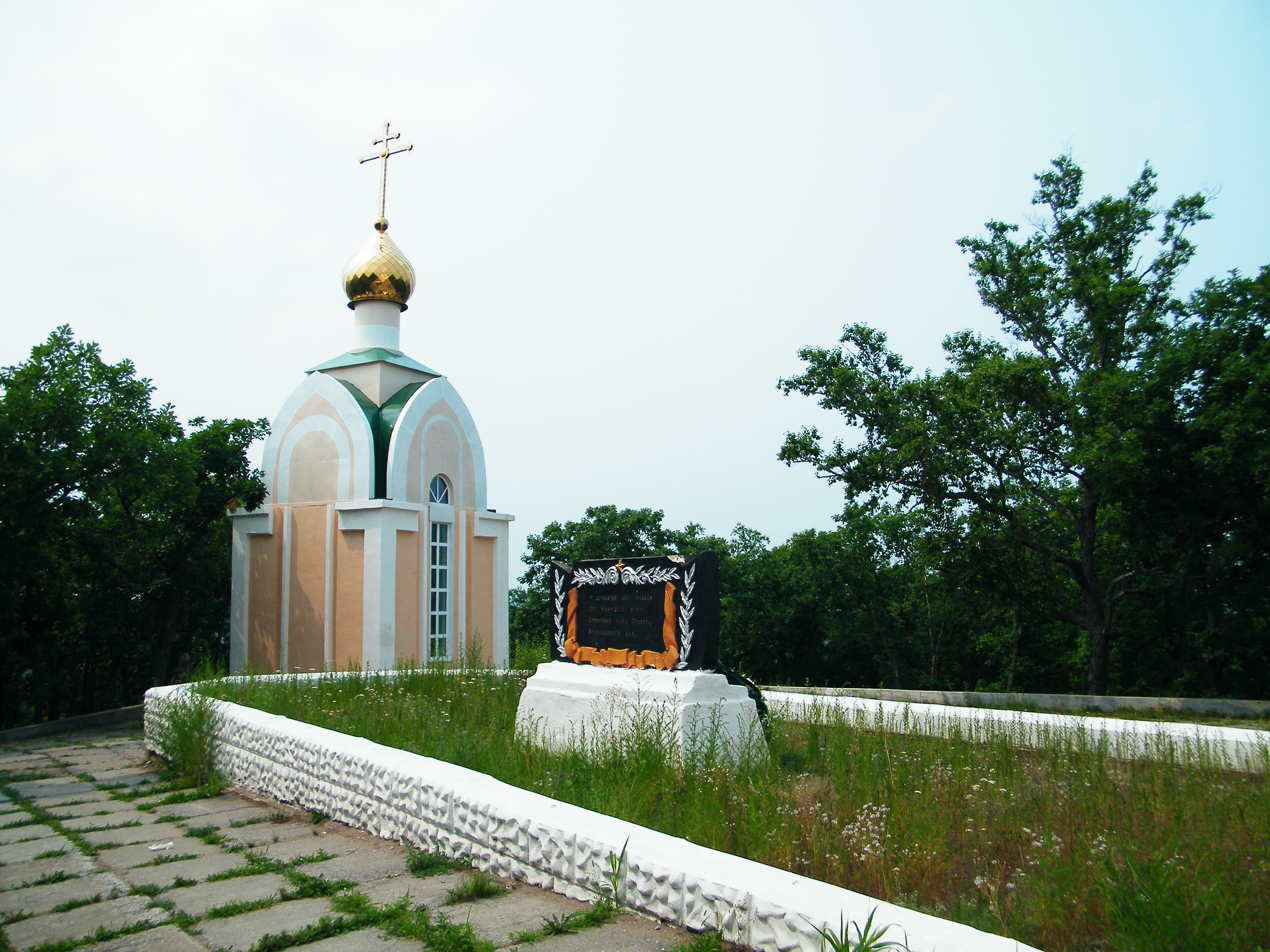
Monument to the battle

On February 13, Molchanov's White forces retreated past Khabarovsk and the Red Army entered the city.

The Red Army was too exhausted to effectively pursue the White Army, which escaped encirclement. However, White military fortunes continued on a downward path after this battle, and the last remnants of White and Japanese forces in the Far East surrendered or evacuated by October 25, 1922.

== See also ==
- Bibliography of the Russian Revolution and Civil War
- Outline of the Russian Revolution and Civil War
- Index of articles related to the Russian Revolution and Civil War
- The "Russian" Civil Wars, 1916–1926: Ten Years That Shook the World
- Russia in Flames: War, Revolution, Civil War, 1914–1921
- Russia in Revolution: An Empire in Crisis, 1890 to 1928
- Russia: Revolution and Civil War, 1917—1921
- The Russian Revolution: A New History
