= Green wedge =

Green Wedge may refer to:

- Green belt, a policy and land-use zoning designation used in land use planning
- Green Ukraine, a region of the Russian Far East
