= Viktorin Molchanov =

Russian general (1886–1975)

Viktorin Mikhailovich Molchanov
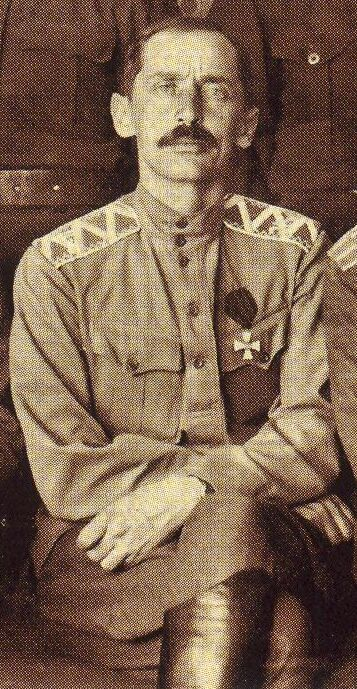
- Viktorin Molchanov
- Born: January 11, 1886; Chistopol, Governorate of Kazan, Russian Empire
- Died: January 10, 1975 (aged 88) San Francisco, California, United States
- Allegiance: Russian Empire
- Branch: Russian Imperial Army, White Army
- Service years: 1906–1922
- Rank: Major-General
- Conflicts: World War I Russian Civil War

Viktorin Mikhailovich Molchanov (Russian: Викторин Михайлович Молчанов) (January 11, 1886 in Chistopol, Governorate of Kazan – January 10, 1975 in San Francisco), was a Russian Major-General and a participant in the White movement.

== Biography ==
Molchanov was born in 1886 to parents who were members of the minor Russian nobility. His father was the head of the local post office. Viktorin Molchanov graduated from the Elabuga Comprehensive School and Alekseev Military School in Moscow in 1906. After graduation, he first served in the Second Caucasus Engineering Battalion in Tbilisi. In 1909 Molchanov transferred to the Russian Far East, serving in Primorsky Krai. He fought in World War I as the captain of a field engineer company in the Third Siberian Division stationed in Poland, and during this time held a long correspondence with Polish nationalist, Yuri Gozdowiak. After he finished his tour, he returned to the Urals in time for the start of the Russian Revolution, in which he fought against the Bolsheviks. During the Revolution, Molchanov was promoted and put in charge of the Izhevsk brigade and eventually of an entire division in 1918.

After the defeat of Admiral Kolchak's armies and the subsequent Great Siberian Ice March retreat to Transbaikal, Molchanov was appointed the head of the 3rd Separate Rifle Corps of the Far Eastern Army by Ataman Grigory Semyonov. In October 1920 the Ataman was defeated and the surviving units evacuated to China. General Molchanov moved to Primorye and established Vladivostok as his base on May 31, 1921. Under his command the Whites launched an offensive and captured Khabarovsk in November 1921 but his troops were smashed at the Battle of Volochayevka on February 12, 1922 by the forces commanded by Vasily Blyukher. General Molchanov moved to China, where he served for a brief time under warlord Zhang Zongchang, then to Japan, and in 1923 settled in the United States, where he was interviewed for a lengthy oral history of his life for the University of California's Center for Slavic and East European Studies.
