= Boris Khreschatitsky =

Russian general and White emigree, member of the French Foreign Legion

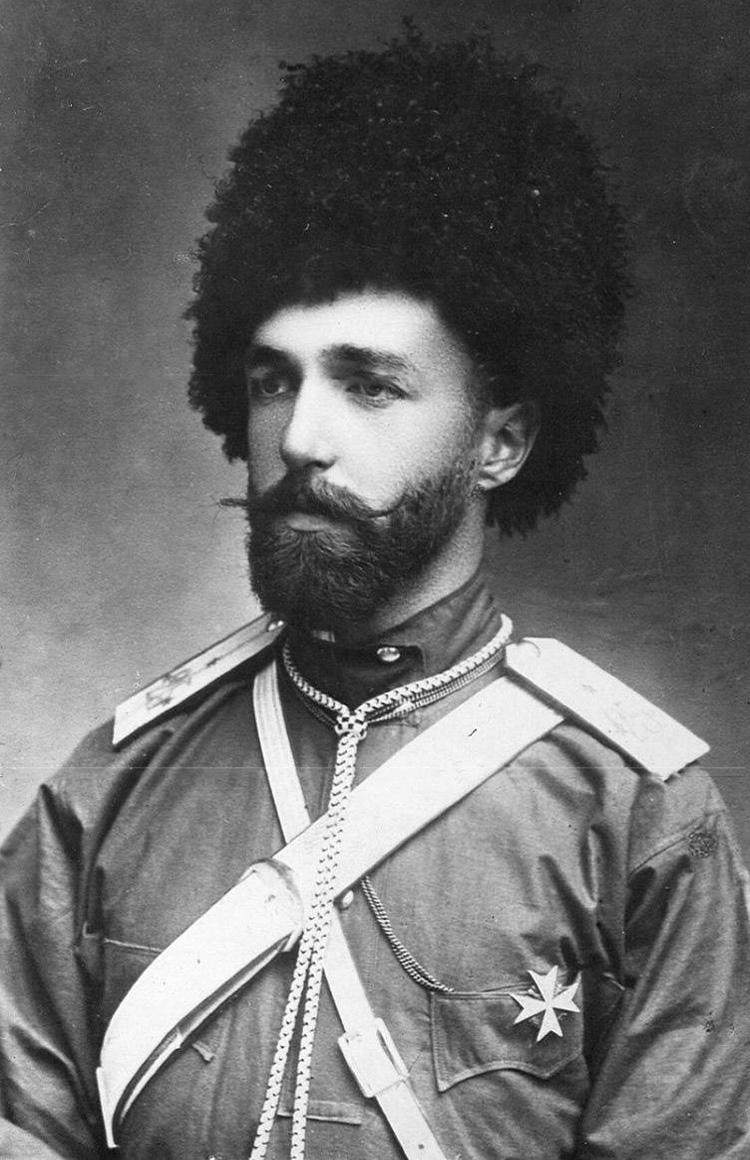
- Khreschatitsky, unknown date
- Born: 23 July [O.S. 11 July] 1881; Novo-Nikolayevskaya, Don Host Oblast, Russian Empire (now in Ukraine)
- Died: 22 July 1940 (aged 59); Sousse, Tunisia
- Military career
- Allegiance: Russian Empire; Green Ukraine; France
- Branch: Imperial Russian Army; White Army; French Foreign Legion
- Service years: 1900–1917 (Imperial Russian Army); 1917–1921 (White Army); 1927–1940 (French Foreign Legion)

Boris Rostislavovich Khreschatitsky (Note: Russian: Борис Ростиславович Хрещатицкий; Ukrainian: Борис Ростиславович Хрещатицький, romanized: Borys Rostyslavovych Khreshchatytsky) (Note: Unless otherwise specified, dates up to and including 1917 are given in the Julian calendar, which was in use in Russia during this time.) (23 July [O.S. 11 July] 1881 – 22 July 1940) was a general in the Imperial Russian Army of Ukrainian origin during the First World War and Russian Civil War, briefly the ataman of Green Ukraine and later a member of the French Foreign Legion in emigration.

== Biography ==
=== Early life and ancestry ===
Boris Rostislavovich Khreschatitsky was born on 23 July [O.S. 11 July] 1881 in the stanitsa Novo-Nikolayevskaya, part of the Don Host Oblast in the Russian Empire to a Russian noble family of Ukrainian origin. His father, Rostislav Khreschatitsky, was a General of the Cavalry, governor-general of the Priamurye Governorate-General and the ataman of the Amur Cossacks, hailing from Stanitsa Luganskaya (now part of Ukraine).

=== Russian military service ===
Khreschatitsky studied at the Aleksandrovsky Cadet Corps and the Page Corps, graduating in 1898 and 1900, respectively. He entered military service on 1 September 1900 and was promoted to khorunzhyi of the Cossack Leib Guard Regiment on 9 August 1900. On 28 April 1904, he was promoted to sotnik of the same unit. He saw combat during the Russo-Japanese War and was then promoted to podyesaul (equivalent to shtabskapitan of the infantry) on 6 December 1908. He became a yesaul on 26 August 1912, then polkovnik on 14 April 1913.

During the First World War, he commanded the 52nd Don Cossack Regiment (6 August 1914 – 9 September 1916), then the 2nd brigade of the 1st Don Cossack Division (9 September 1916 – 22 October 1917). In January 1918, he was placed under the command of General Horvat in Harbin. He was the chief of staff of the Russian troops of the Chinese Eastern Railway (8 March 1918 – 14 November 1918). On 14 December 1918, the Ukrainian Far Eastern Krai Rada awarded him the rank of ataman of the Far Eastern Ukrainian Host.

From September to November 1919, he was the inspector of Far Eastern Strategic Reserve units. He was made the chief of ministry of foreign affairs of Grigory Semyonov's Far Eastern Army on 26 June 1920, then Semyonov's representative in China (7 June 1920 onwards). He was a member of the Supreme Military Council of Transbaikal in August 1921.

=== Later life and death ===
After the Whites lost the Russian Civil war, he first emigrated to China and then to France in 1925. He was briefly the commander of Cossack group of the French Foreign Legion in 1927–1928 in Syria. Until his retirement in July 1940, he served in the Foreign Legion, attaining the command of a squadron after joining as a private.

He died on 22 July 1940 in the town of Sousse, then part of the French protectorate of Tunisia.

== Honours ==
=== Russian ===
- Order of Saint Vladimir 3rd class with swords (18 May 1915)
- Order of Saint Anna 2nd class with swords (29 January 1916)
- Order of Saint Stanislaus 1st class (1909)
- Saint George's Sword (18 July 1915)

=== Foreign ===
- Legion of Honour Officier (France, 1919)
- Croix de Guerre with a palm leaf (France, 1919)
- Distinguished Service Order (United Kingdom)
- Order of the Lion and the Sun (Iran)

== See also ==
- White movement
- Don Cossacks
- Far Eastern Front in the Russian Civil War

== Bibliography ==
- Volkov; Yegorov; Kuptsov (2003). Белые генералы Восточного фронта Гражданской войны: Биографический справочник [White generals of the Eastern front of the Civil War: a biographical dictionary] (in Russian). Moscow. ISBN 5-85887-169-0.
- Kuptsov (2009). Astafyev; Kleytman (eds.). "Биографии генералов Восточного фронта, уроженцев Средней и Нижней Волги и Области Войска Донского" [Biographies of the generals of the Eastern front, natives of the Middle and Lower Volga and the Oblast of the Don Host]. Нижне-волжский исторический сборник Царицынского генеалогического общества (in Russian) (1). Volgograd.
