= Grey Ukraine =

Ukrainian ethnographic and cultural region in Kazakhstan and Russia

Grey Ukraine (also Grey Klyn; Ukrainian: Сірий Клин, romanized: Siryi Klyn, also Сіра Україна – "Grey Ukraine"; Russian: Серый Клин, romanized: Seryy Klin) is an unofficial name for a region in Southern Siberia and Northern Kazakhstan, where mass settlement of Ukrainians took place from the middle of the 18th to the beginning of the 20th century. Around 1917–1920 there was a movement for Ukrainian autonomy in the region.

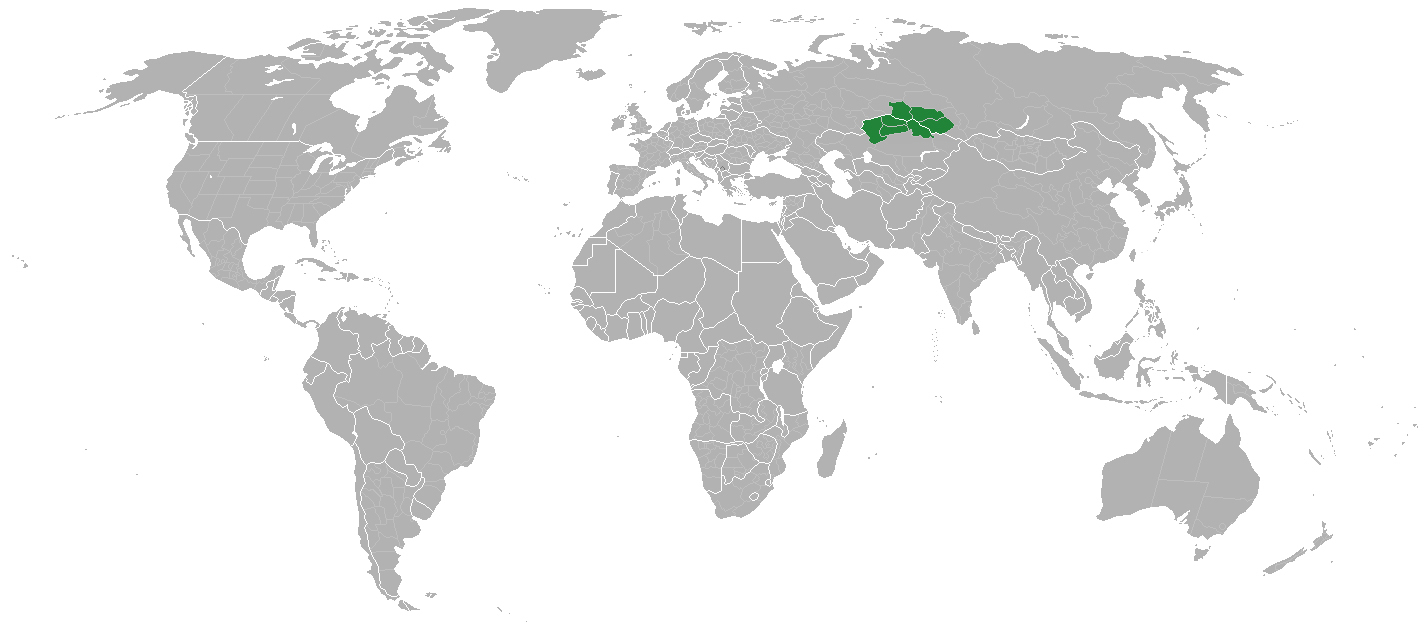
Location of Grey Ukraine

== History ==
Ukraine according to an old postal stamp from 1919, which was reprinted in 2008, includes some of Grey Ukraine in the upper right.

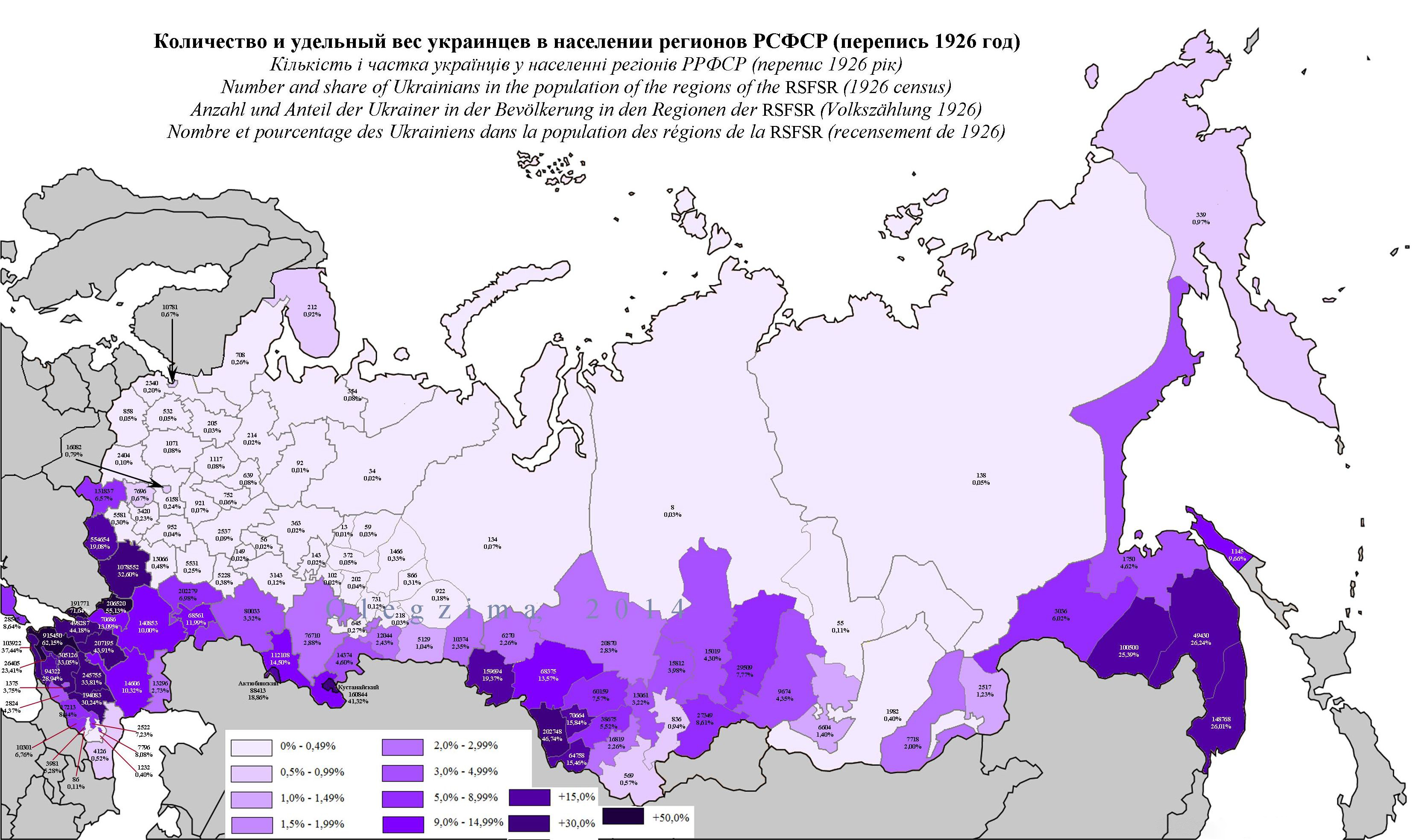
Number and share of Ukrainians in the population of the regions of the RSFSR (1926 census)

The Ukrainian settlement of Siryi Klyn (literally: the "grey wedge") developed around the city of Omsk in western Siberia. M. Bondarenko, an emigrant from Poltava province, wrote before World War I: "The city of Omsk looks like a typical Moscovite city, but the bazaar and markets speak Ukrainian". Altogether, before 1914, 1,604,873 emigrants from Ukraine settled in the area.

Historical Grey Ukraine exists roughly within the southern Siberia which includes northern part of Kazakhstan. It is not contiguous with other territories inhabited by Ukrainian diaspora, in a similar situation of territorial isolation as with Green Ukraine.

Most of the Ukrainian migrations to Siberia happened between the mid-18th century and early 20th century. After conquering it in the early 18th century, the Russian Empire decided to resettle the region by handing 40% of newly created settlements there to Ukrainian settlers and 30% to Russian and Belarusian settlers. By 1897, Ukrainians made up 7.5% of the population in Akmolinsk Oblast, which contained Omsk and surrounding regions. The ethnic Ukrainians of the region even went as far as declaring the independence of their own state in 1917, but the Bolsheviks quickly dissolved it by 1921. Although the Russian Empire had tolerated expressions of Ukrainian identity, and the Soviet Union had initially adopted a Ukrainization policy in the region, by the end of 1932 the Ukrainization policy was reversed and the Ukrainian identity strongly declined. Migration to the region continued throughout the Soviet period, and Nikita Khrushchev's virgin lands campaign during the 1950s encouraged further migration from across the Soviet Union.

== Demographics ==
In the Russian census of 1897, 51,103 people identified themselves as Little Russians (Ukrainians) in Akmolinsk (Omsk) Oblast, making up 7.5% of the population and forming the third-largest ethnic group after Kazakhs (62.6%) and Russians (25.5%). According to the 2010 Russian census, 77,884 people (2.7%) of the Omsk Oblast identified themselves as Ukrainians, making Ukrainians the third-largest ethnic group there, after Russians and Kazakhs.

== See also ==
- Yellow Ukraine
- Green Ukraine
- Pink Ukraine
- Ukrainians in Siberia
