= Pink Ukraine =

Pink Ukraine Малиновий Клин
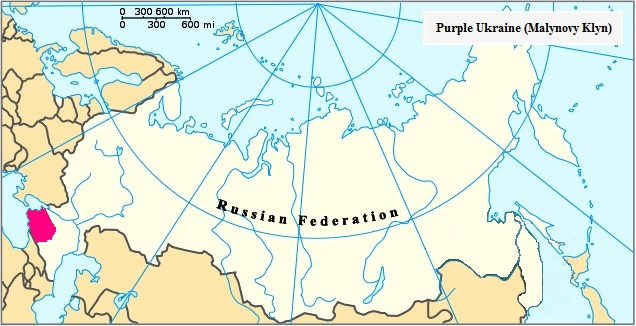
- Approximate area of Pink Ukraine

Area
  - Total: 263,400 km^{2} (101,700 sq mi)
- Demonym(s): Ukrainian: Кубанщина, romanized: Kubanshchyna

Ethnicity

Pink Ukraine (Ukrainian: Малиновий Клин, lit. 'Raspberry Wedge'; Russian: Малиновый Клин) is a region in Kuban with a significant Ukrainian population.

== History ==
=== Settlement ===
Ukrainians first began settling in the region at the end of the 18th century following the dissolution of the Cossack Hetmanate, mainly of Zaporizhzhian Cossacks and peasants. As the 7th Russo-Turkish war brewed, the Russian Empire needed military power, and General Grigory Potemkin helped re-create Cossack hosts to fight alongside Russian soldiers against the Ottomans, most notably the Black Sea Cossack Host. These Cossack soldiers later founded at least 40 towns in the Kuban region, and many resettled there.

=== Kuban Republic ===
The Kuban Rada was formed by Cossack delegates of the regional congress of representatives from the settlements of Kuban following the February Revolution of 1917. In November of the same year, it elected its own regional government from among the members, then declared the creation of the Kuban People's Republic on January 28, 1918. This state was centered around the city of Yekaterinodar, and dissolved by 1920.

=== Russification ===
Up until the early 20th century, many of the settlers considered themselves "Little Russians" (Ukrainian: малороси), another name for Ukrainians. Many also often preserved their ancestors' language and cultural traditions. According to censuses in the 1930s, around 62% of the population in the Krasnodar Territory self-identified as Ukrainian, but this share significantly dropped during the Holodomor.

In the present day, around 82% of the population in Krasnodar Krai self-identify as "Russians", even though their dialect Balachka still somewhat resembles the dialects around the Dnipro river.

== Demographics ==
=== 1897 Census ===
In the 1897 Russian Census for Kuban Oblast, there were a total of 1,918,881 people. Here are the following results based on ethnicity:

No.	Ethnicity	Tamansky otdel	Yeysky otdel	Yekaterinodarsky otdel	Kavkazsky otdel	Batalpashinsky otdel	Maykopsky otdel	Labinsky otdel	Total
1	Ukrainians	75.2%	73.9%	51.8%	45.8%	27.1%	31.3%	18.9%	47.4%
2	Russians	17.1%	23.6%	34.2%	51.1%	41.9%	31.3%	75.2%	42.6%
3	Circassians Kabardians	...	...	8,1%	...	5.7%	4.9%	...	2.0%
4	Karachays Tatars	...	...	...	...	12.5%	...	...	1.4%
5	Volga Germans	...	...	...	1.6%	2.0%	...	1.9%	1.1%
6	Greeks	4.0%	...	1.4%	...	...	...	...	1.1%
7	Armenians	...	...	1.1%	...	...	...	1.7%	...
8	Abkhazians Abazins	...	...	...	...	3.9%	2.1%	...	...
9	Nogais	...	...	...	...	2.7%	...	...	...

=== 1926 Census ===
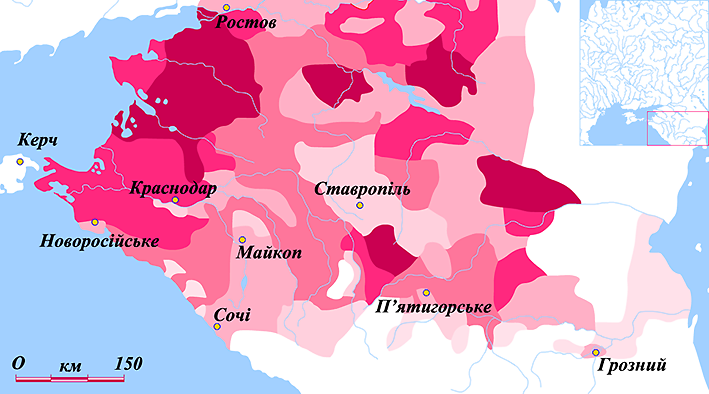
Ukrainian population map in 1926

The demographic data for Kuban Okrug in the 1926 Soviet census is as follows:

No.	Ethnicity	Population	%
1	Ukrainians	915,450	62.2 %
2	Russians	498,120	33.8%
3	Armenians	21,023	1.4%
4	Belorussians	8,434	0.6%
5	Volga Germans	7,255	0.5%
6	Others	22,266	1.5%
	Total	1,472,548	100.0%

== See also ==
There were other regions with significant Ukrainian population in modern-day Russia, including Yellow Ukraine in the Volga Basin, Grey Ukraine in Central Asia and Green Ukraine in the Russian Far East.
