= Yankan =

Yankan Янкан
- Selo
- Location within Amur Oblast Location within Russia
- Coordinates: 54°15′N 124°18′E
- Country: Russia
- Region: Amur Oblast
- District: Tyndinsky District
- Time zone: UTC+9:00

Yankan (Russian: Янкан) is a rural locality (a selo) in Solovyovsky Selsoviet of Tyndinsky District, Amur Oblast, Russia. The population was 53 as of 2018. There is 1 street.

== Geography ==
Yankan is located 140 km south of Tynda (the district's administrative centre) by road. Solovyovsk is the nearest rural locality.
