= Yurii Hlushko =

Ukrainian politician (1882–1942)

Yurii "Mova" Hlushko
- Ю́рій «Мова» Глушко́
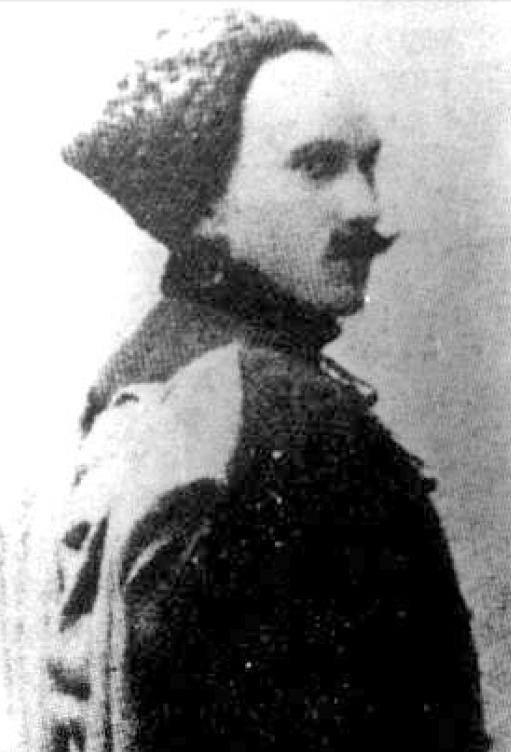

Secretariat of the Ukrainian Far Eastern Regional Council
- In office October 24, 1918 – 1922
- Preceded by: Gordiy Melashic
- Succeeded by: Office abolished

Personal details
- Born: April 4, 1882 Nova Basan, Chernihiv Oblast, Russian Empire
- Died: October 28, 1942 (aged 60) Kyiv, Reichskommissariat Ukraine

Yurii Kosmych Hlushko (Ukrainian: Ю́рій Косьмич Глушко́, known by the pseudonym Mova (Ukrainian: Мова; 4 April 1882 – 28 October 1942), was a Ukrainian public and political figure, one of the organizers of Ukrainian national cultural existence in Green Ukraine (Zelenyi Klyn).

== Life ==
Hlushko was born on 4 April 1882 in the village of Nova Basan, Chernihiv Oblast.

In 1896 Hlushko graduated from the Zhmerynka two-class railway school, and in 1899, the Kiev Technical Railway School as a speciality technician. During 1901–1903, he worked as a machinist (steamship engineer) in the Voluntary Fleet which provided sea transportation from Odessa to Vladivostok. During 1883 – 1901 the steamship company transported immigrants from Ukraine to Green Ukraine.

Between 1904 and 1907, he worked for the Chinese Eastern Railway in Manchuria. From 1907, he lived in Vladivostok, worked as a draftsman and technician (1908–1910), and later as a technician in the construction of the Vladivostok fortress (1911–1916). Since then, he has connect his life with Ukrainian cultural life in Vladivostok. He began to use his creative pseudonym – Yuri Mova - first recorded in 1908. He became active in the amateur Ukrainian theater society organized by the local Ukrainian community and the Ukrainian student society.

Hlushko was mobilized during the First World War and served at the Caucasian front in 1916–1917. In the spring of 1918 he became the head of the Vladivostok Ukrainian society "Prosvita" (Ukrainian: Просвіта—"Enlightenment") and the Vladivostok Ukrainian Council. He became the chairman of the 3rd Ukrainian Far Eastern Council in the summer of 1918. He organized the 4th Ukrainian Far Eastern Council, which proclaimed him head of the Ukrainian Far Eastern Secretariat.

== Secretariat of the Green Wedge ==
In the Autumn of 1918, Hlushko initiated the IV Ukrainian Far Eastern Congress in Vladivostok, where he was approved by the head of the Ukrainian Far Eastern Secretariat – the executive body of the Ukrainian Far Eastern Regional Council, Since then, Hlushko became the head of the Ukrainian National Liberation Movement of the Green Wedge.

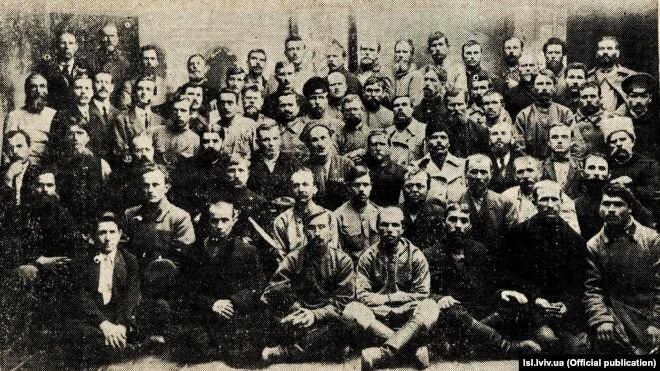
Yurii Hlushko is in the centre

The full registration of statehood did not come due to unfavourable military-political circumstances. But, having a modest financial capabilities. Hlushko published Ukrainian editions: Sincere Speech, the Constitution of National and Cultural Autonomy of Ukrainians in the Far East.

There was an idea of political unification with the Ukrainian People's Republic and the return of Ukrainian immigrants to their homeland, but they failed to implement.

== Chita Trial & Exile ==
Bolsheviks and the White Guards were equally hostile to Hlushko, He was first arrested in 1919 by the White Guards, but managed to escape and hide before the fall of the regime of Admiral Kolchak.

He was arrested for the second time in November 1922. This time, the closest employees of Hlushko were also imprisoned. They were charged with concluding an agreement with the Whites in order to establish Ukrainian national and cultural autonomy in the Far East, and they received financial assistance from Japan, and extradite passports of the Ukrainian People's Republic with national symbols, spreading anti-soviet rumours and "counter-revolutionary" literature, illegal appointment of teachers to Ukrainian national schools.

From September 1924 to April 1925, the trial took place in the city of Chita; 122 people appeared before the court: former white officers, cossacks, and the representatives of the Ukrainian intelligentsia, supporters of the movement for the independence of the green wedge. The main judge was Alexey Grigorievich Serebryakov. The court was public: the authorities sought to intimidate the population and show the determination in the struggle against the "counter-revolution"

At the trial, the Soviet authorities stigmatized the following Ukrainian Associations:

Newspapers:

- Green Klin (Blagoveshchensk)
- The Ukrainian Voice (Nikolsk-Ussuriysk)
- "Our Land" (Khabarovsk)

Organizations:

- Ukrainian Dalekhoskhidna Nazionna Rada (Khabarovsk)
- Commodity of Ukrainian Molodi "Promin" (Vladivostok)
- The Cooperative of Ukraine
- Blagoveshchensk Cultural Committee Ukrains
- Commodity Of Ukraine Amur (Free)

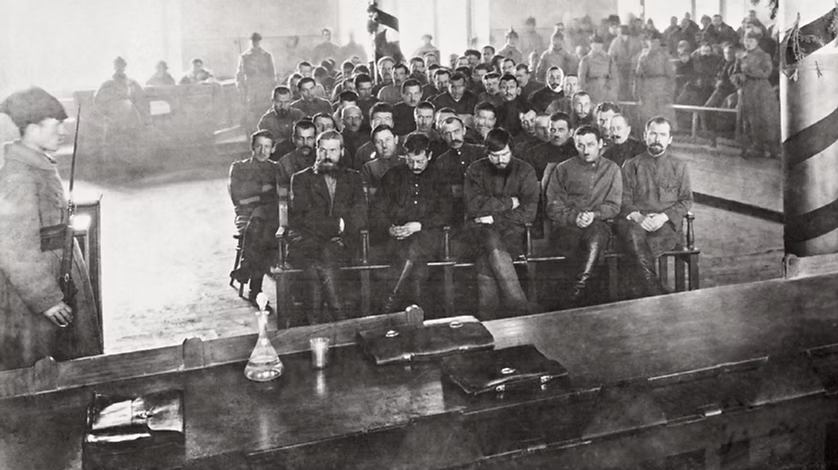
Chita Process 1924 – General Anatoly Pepelyayev First Row Centre

At the Chita trial he was accused of: organization of the Ukrainian underground, the desire to create an independent state of the Green Wedge, relations with Japan.

My whole fault is in front of you that I wanted a Ukrainian here in the Far East to have the right to be Ukrainian – to speak in the mother’s language, to sing songs from fathers, to read the books of our writers.

A power that fears the truth is forced to fear those who speak their native language.

— Yurii Hlushko-Mova

With being charged of espionage in favour of Japan. Hlushko replied:

I wasn't a spy of Japan. My only dream is that my people live freely and proudly under the sky of the Green Klin.

— Yurii Hlushko-Mova

He sat under Kolchak and was sentenced to death for fighting for organizing a Ukrainian Klyn, in order to prevent the russification of Ukrainians and their use for fratricidal struggle.

Hlushko was sentenced to 10–15 years in the camps, a lifetime ban on living in the far eastern territory and the territory of the Ukrainian SSR. In the last word, many defendants did not address the judges, but to their people, as if knowing that it was there that their real court and sentences were.

I’m not asking for mercy. My only wish is that my people should not forget what we fought for. We are not criminals, we are fighters for truth and freedom!.

— Yurii Hlushko-Mova

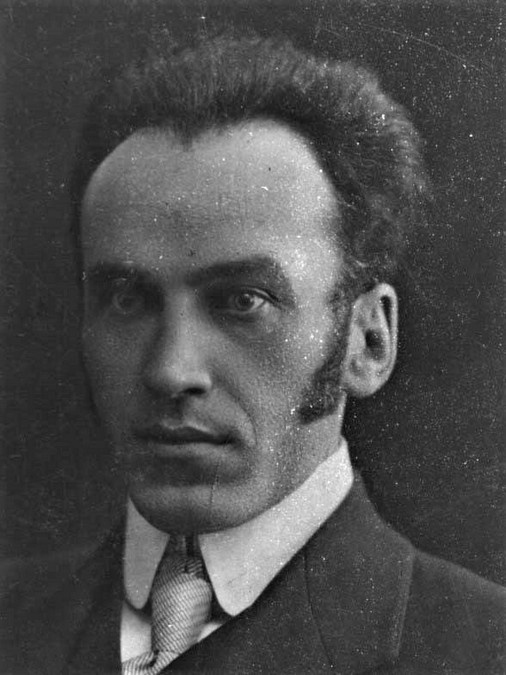
1925 Portrait of Yurii Hlushko

Hlushko was sentenced to 10–15 years of labour camps, out of 28 people. Mikita Litvinenko, Savva Palamarchuk, Oleksiy Kararenko, Dmitro Lashchenko, Ivan Nagorny, Anna Politkovskaya and Anton Ganzha.

After giving amnesty, halving his sentence, he worked as a technician in the Far East and Tajikistan.

== Later life ==
Hlushko returned to Ukraine and settled in Kyiv – probably under a different name. This assumption is because Yurii managed to avoid repression in the 1930s, which was almost impossible, given his previous activities. During this period, he worked as an engineer of construction organizations and, as he later said:

"I had to hide all my life, to disguise himself to the layman, so that no one guessed who I am."

Most of the documents that were stored in the family and could become compromising were burned.

When the Nazis occupied Kyiv in the fall of 1941, Yurri Hlushko was without work and practically without means of subsistence. The writer Dokiya Humenna left a memory of him during this period:

“The Sofiewevsky Board (Lvivska, 9) came and so did Hlushko-Mova, maybe not so much for help, but to ask for what work. He was a very tall, bent and slender, old gray man. Striked on the then background with his elegance, artistry. Ironing, cleanliness, selective attention to your appearance and even a black butterfly under the neck. The facial features are very aristocratic and, surprisingly, did not do anything old with its beauty. His impromptuness, eloquence and freshness of thought and assessments were immediately won. I complained that he had an article a memory of Mikhail Staritsky (there was an anniversary date, and the article was very valuable), but the editor of the newspaper “New Ukr. Word" Shtepa, did not accept it, because it is, they say, not relevant. It was relevant to fill the newspaper with information about third-rate German scientists. In such a homeless, not supported by anyone, even though there could still be a lot of things, lived his last days. He himself understood everything well that he still had the duty to submit memories of his activities and had all the data to this, because he had a pen. No one needed it!”

— Dokiya Humenna

The testimony of Yurri Hlushko Mova was left by the head of the Kyiv City Council of the period of the Nazi Occupation – Leontii Forostiv

“He told me about the enthusiasm with which at one time the Ukrainian case was built on Green Ukraine, showed his documents, from which it was evident that he was the Prime Minister of the Ukrainian Government, which set its task as the Unity and Independence of all territories inhabited by Ukrainians. Hlushko-Mova made an impression of a direct, honest, modest person and a conscious Ukrainian-concilier from the first acquaintance.”

— Leontii Forostiv

On October 28, 1942 Yurri Hlushko died in occupied Kyiv from starvation and exhaustion. He was buried in the Lukyaniv Cemetery. The family of Hlushko – Claudia Matviyivana Ivanash (1881–1947), daughters Kateryna and Natalia – remained in Kyiv. The grave was preserved and well groomed.

== Memorials ==
In 2012, the chairy fund "Heroika" installed a new monument – the cossack cross – the cossack cross on the grave of the Ukrainian patriot. In December 2019, in honour of Yurii Hlushko, the former Bolshevik Street of Pubiysky in the Shevchenkivskyi district of the capital was renamed.

== Works ==
- Підручник актьорові. — Владивосток, 1918.

== Literature ==
- Глушко Юрій // Енциклопедія українознавства. Словникова частина. — Т. 1. — С. 389. (in Ukrainian)
- Попок А. Глушко Юрій // Енциклопедія історії України. — Т. 2. — К., 2005. — С. 124–125. (in Ukrainian)
- Биховський Л. Ю. К. Глушко-Мова // Нові дні. — 1952. — Вересень. (in Ukrainian)
- Світ І. Суд над українцями в Читі в 1923—1924 рр. // Визвольний шлях. — 1963. — Книги 3–5. (in Ukrainian)
- Чорномаз В. Глушко-Мова Юрій // Енциклопедія сучасної України. — Т.5. — К., 2006. (in Ukrainian)
- Степанов Іван. Українець з Далекого Сходу // Дзеркало тижня. — 2002. — No. 15 (390). (in Ukrainian)
