= Yellow Ukraine =

Historical Ukrainian settlement centered on the middle and lower Volga river

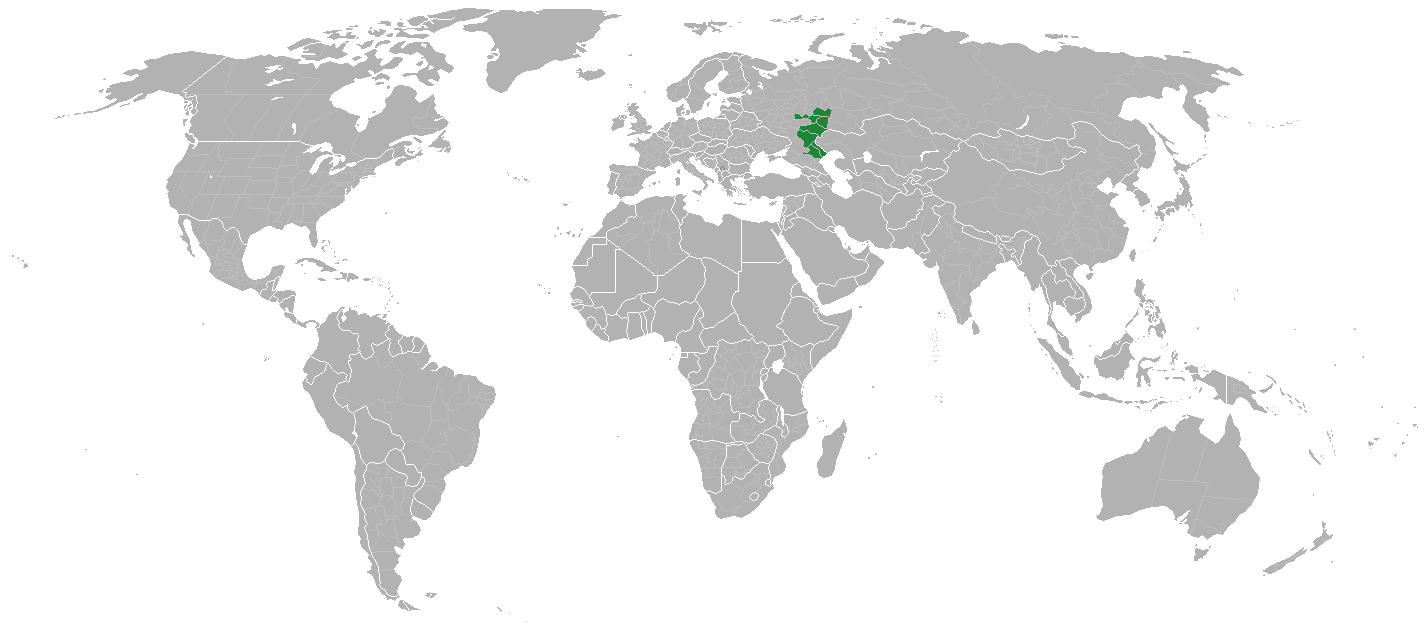
Yellow Ukraine on the world map.

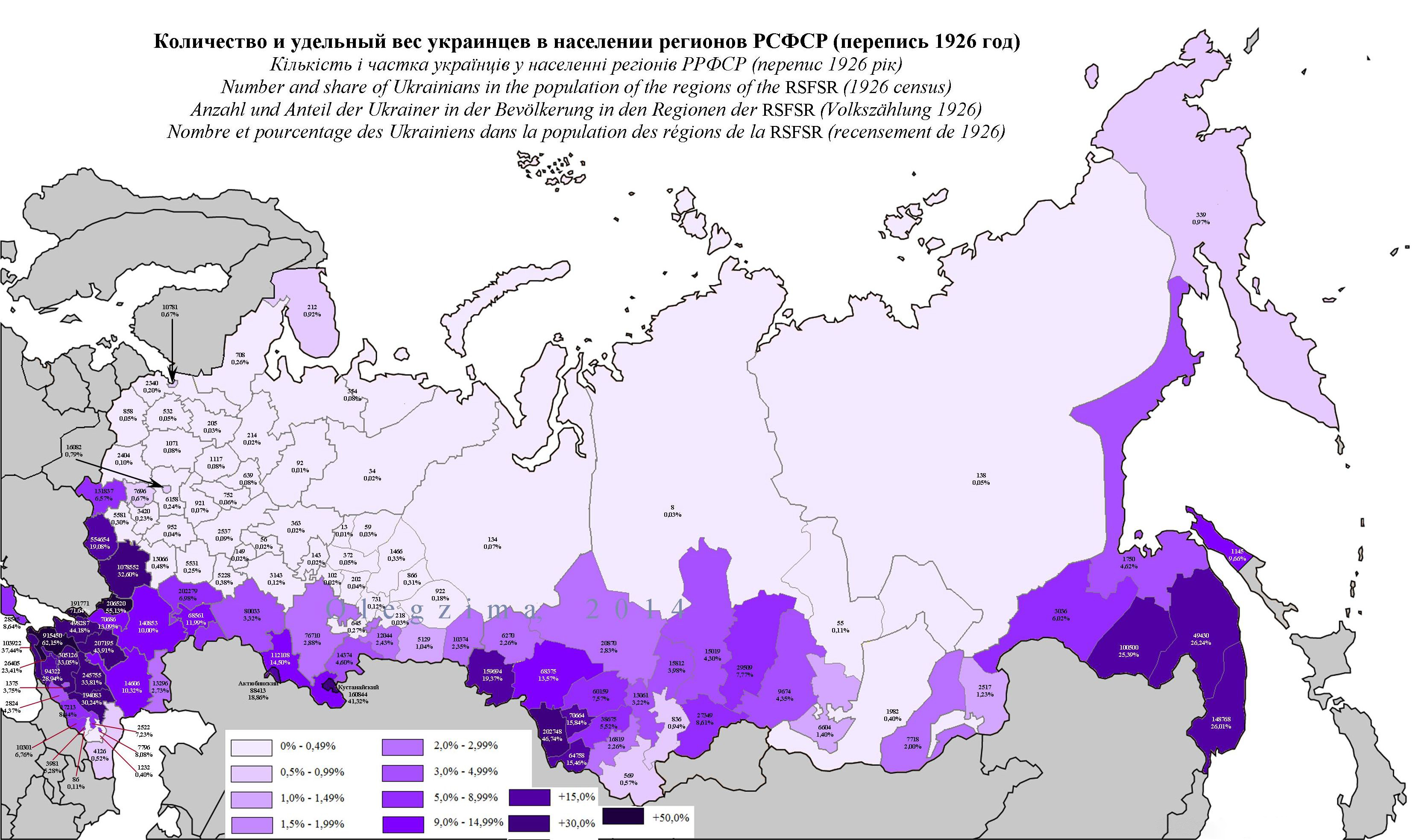
Number and share of Ukrainians in the population of the regions of the RSFSR (1926 census)

Yellow Ukraine (Ukrainian: Жовтий Клин, romanized: Zhovtyi Klyn, lit. 'Yellow Wedge'), also known as Zhovty Klyn, is a historical territory with significant Ukrainian settlement in Volga Region.

The settlement of Zhovty Klyn (the Yellow Wedge) started soon after the Pereiaslav agreement as the eastern border of the second Zasechnaya Cherta. Named after the yellow color of steppes on the middle and lower Volga, these colonies co-existed with the Volga Cossacks; colonists primarily settled around the city of Saratov. In addition to Ukrainians, Volga Germans and Mordovians migrated to Zhovty Klyn in numbers. As of 2014, most of the population is mixed in the region, though a few "pure" Ukrainian villages remain.

== See also ==
- Green Ukraine
- Grey Ukraine
- Pink Ukraine
- Volga Germans
- Yellow Russia
