= Vasily Blyukher =

Marshal of the Soviet Union (1889–1938)

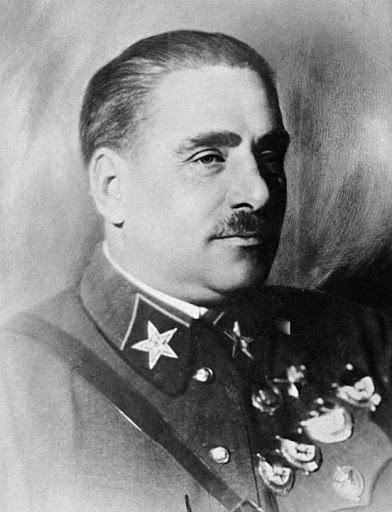
- Blyukher c. 1930s
- Born: Vasily Konstantinovich Gurov; 1 December 1889; Barschinka, Russian Empire
- Died: 9 November 1938 (aged 48); Moscow, Russian SFSR, Soviet Union
- Burial place: Donskoi Cemetery
- Military career
- Allegiance: Russian Empire (1914–1915); Soviet Russia / Soviet Union (1917–1938)
- Branch: (Russian Empire) Russian Imperial Army; Red Army
- Service years: 1914–1915; 1917–1938
- Rank: (Russian Empire)
- Nickname: "Red Napoleon"
- Commands: Special Red Banner Far Eastern Army
- Conflicts: First World War; Russian Civil War; Eastern Front; Dutov Uprising; Battle of Orenburg (1918); Ural Campaign (1918); Battles of Perm; First Perm Offensive; Perm Operation (1919); Spring offensive of the White Army; Eastern Front Counteroffensive; Chelyabinsk Operation (1919); Great Siberian Ice March; Final Operations againts Wrangelshchina; Northern Taurida Operation; Battle of Kakhovka; Perekop-Chongar Operation; Far Eastern Front; Spassk operation; Battle of Volochayevka; Sino-Soviet conflict; Soviet–Japanese Border Wars; Battle of Lake Khasan
- Awards: Order of Lenin (2); Order of the Red Banner (4); Order of the Red Star

Vasily Konstantinovich Blyukher (Russian: Васи́лий Константи́нович Блю́хер, romanized: Vasily Konstantinovich Blyukher; 1 December 1889 – 9 November 1938) was a Soviet military commander and Marshal of the Soviet Union.

In 1938, Blyukher was arrested during the period of military purges under Joseph Stalin for spying. He was tortured and blinded by Lavrentiy Beria and his men before succumbing to his injuries. His body was then incinerated on the orders of Stalin.

== Early history ==
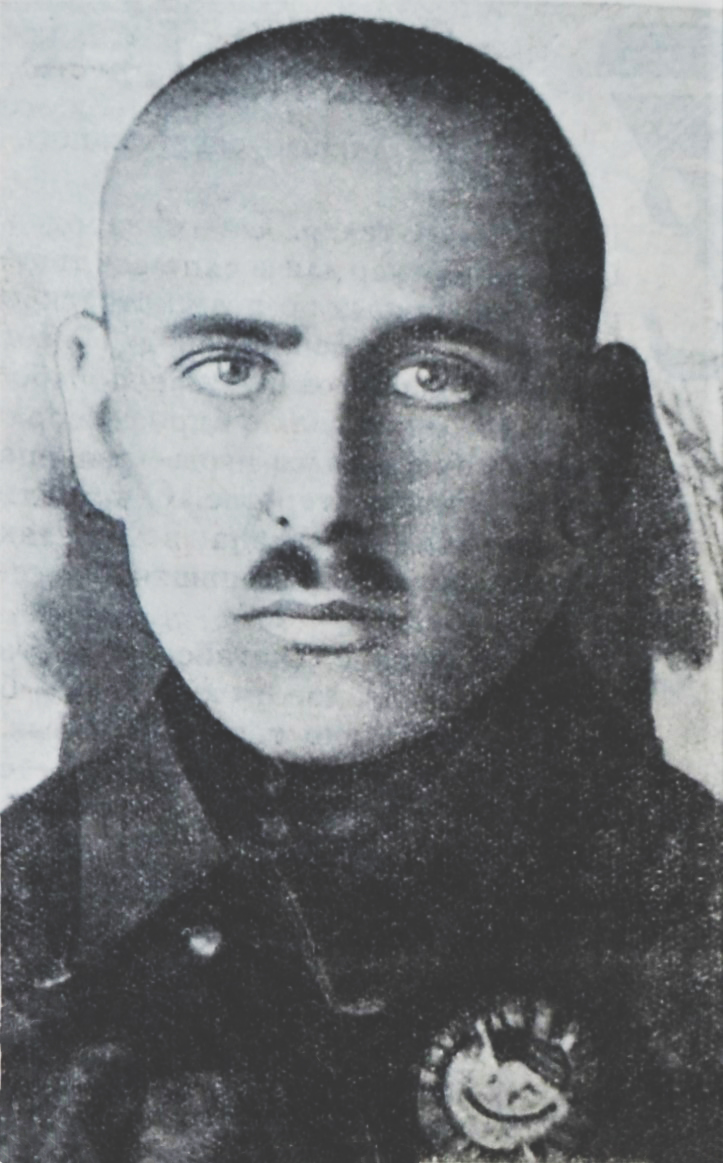
Vasily Blyukher with The First Order of the Red Banner

Blyukher was born into a Russian peasant family named Gurov, in the village of Barschinka in Yaroslavl Governorate. In the 19th century a landlord gave the nickname Blyukher to the Gurov family in commemoration of the famous Prussian Marshal Gebhard Leberecht von Blücher (1742–1819). As a teenager, he was employed at a machine works, but was arrested in 1910 for leading a strike, and sentenced to two years, eight months in prison. In 1914, Vasily Gurov — who later formally assumed Blyukher as his surname — was drafted into the army of the Russian Empire as a corporal but in 1915 was seriously wounded in the Great Retreat, and excused from military service. He then went to work in a factory in Kazan, where he joined the Bolshevik Party in 1916. He took part in the Russian Revolution of 1917 in Samara.

== Civil War ==
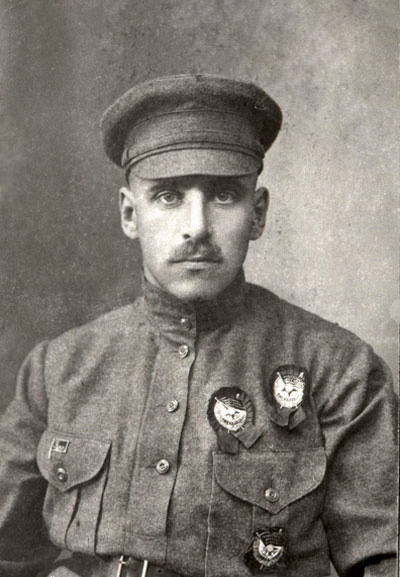
Blyukher at the time of the Russian Civil War

In late November 1917 the Red Guard forces of Commander V. K. Sadlutskii and Commissar Blyukher moved from Samara to Chelyabinsk to suppress Alexander Dutov's revolt. Blyukher joined the Red Army in 1918 and soon became a commander. During the Russian Civil War of 1917–1923, he was one of the outstanding figures on the Bolshevik side. After the Czech Legion revolt started in May 1918, the 10,000-strong South Urals Partisan Army under Blyukher's command marched 1,500 km in 40 days (August–September 1918) of continuous fighting to attack White forces from the rear, then joined with regular Red Army units. For this achievement in September 1918, he became the first recipient of the Order of the Red Banner (later he was awarded it four more times: twice in 1921 and twice in 1928), the citation read: "The raid made by Comrade Blyukher's forces under impossible conditions can only be equated with Suvorov's crossings in Switzerland."

After Blyukher's troops rejoined the Red Army lines in the 3rd Red Army area of the Eastern Front, his force was reorganised as the 51st Rifle Division, which he later led to further triumphs against Baron Wrangel in November 1920. After the Civil War he served as military commander of the Far Eastern Republic's People's Revolutionary Army from 1921 to 1922. From December 1921, he took personal command of the campaign to remove the remnants of anti-Bolshevik forces east of the Amur river. In 1922−1924, he served as the commander of the Petrograd military district.

== Far East command ==
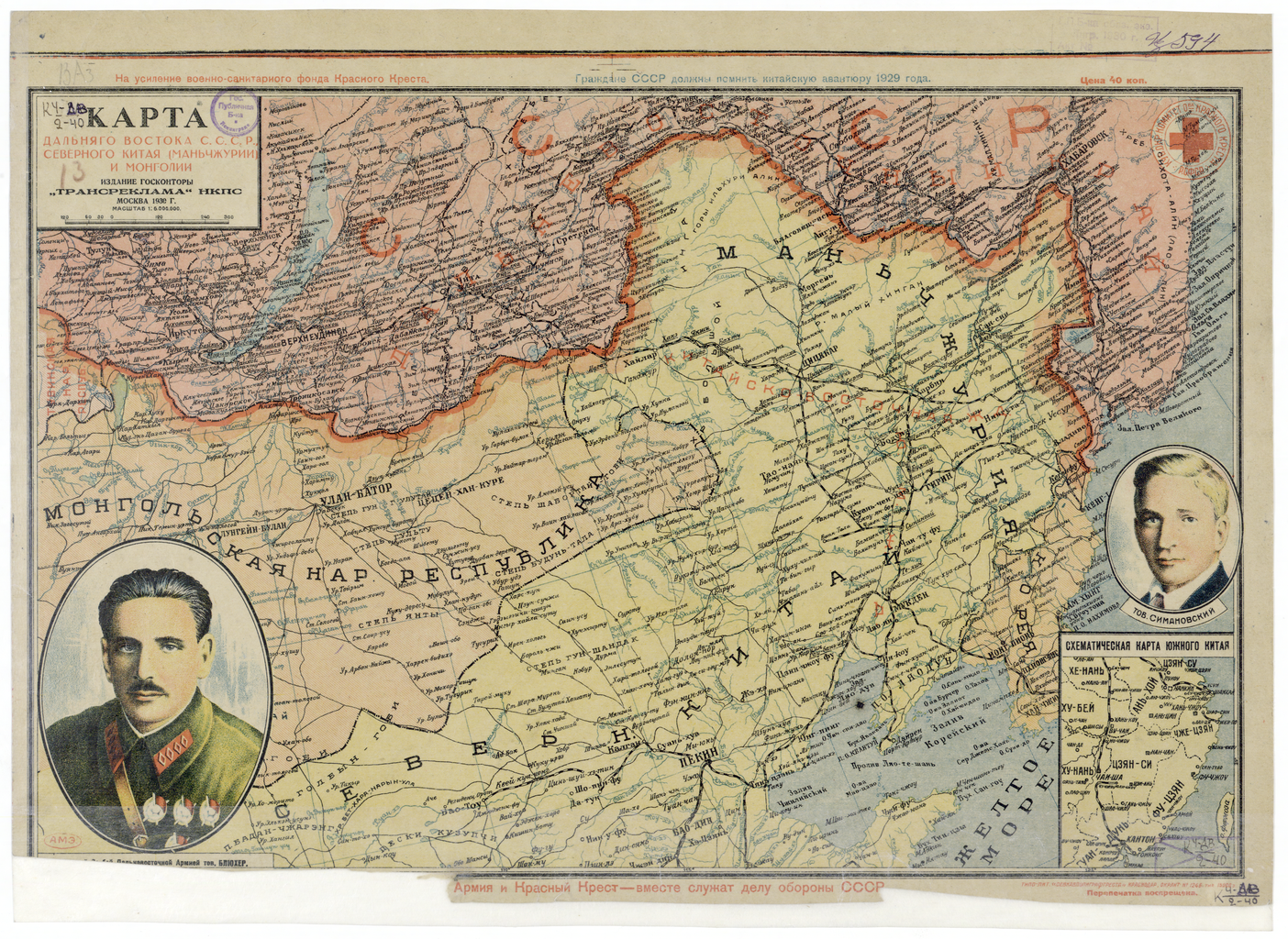
This Soviet propaganda map from 1930 depicts a portrait of Blyukher on the lower left corner.

From 1924 to 1927 Blyukher was a Soviet military adviser in China, where he used the name Galen (after the name of his wife, Galina) while attached to Chiang Kai-shek's military headquarters. He was responsible for the military planning of the Northern Expedition which began the Kuomintang unification of China. Among those he instructed in this period was Lin Biao, later a leading figure in the Chinese People's Liberation Army. Chiang allowed Blyukher to "escape" after his anti-communist purge. On his return he was given command of the Ukrainian Military District, and then in 1929 he was transferred to the vitally important military command in the Far Eastern Military District, known as the Special Red Banner Far Eastern Army (OKDVA).

Based at Khabarovsk, Blyukher exercised a degree of autonomy in the Far East unusual for a Soviet military commander. With Japan steadily extending its grip on China and hostile to the Soviet Union, the Far East was an active military command. In the Russo-Chinese Chinese Eastern Railroad War of 1929–30 he defeated Chinese warlord forces in a quick campaign. For this outstanding achievement he became the first recipient of the Order of the Red Star in September 1930, and became popularly known as the "Red Napoleon". In 1935 he was made a Marshal of the Soviet Union. From July to August 1938 he commanded the Soviet Far East Front in a less decisive action against the Japanese at the Battle of Lake Khasan, on the border between the Soviet Union and Japanese-occupied Korea.

== Soviet purges and death ==
The importance of the Far East Front gave Blyukher a certain degree of immunity from Stalin's purge of Red Army command, which had begun in 1937 with execution of Mikhail Tukhachevsky—in fact, Blyukher had been a member of the tribunal that convicted Tukhachevsky. On 15 June 1938, three days after the head of the Far Eastern NKVD Genrikh Lyushkov defected to Japan, Blyukher visited NKVD headquarters in Moscow, seeking information about the defector and about potential consequences of his disappearance. He met the deputy head of the NKVD, Mikhail Frinovsky, who appears to have reassured him that he would not be held responsible for letting Lyushkov cross the Manchurian border. On 17 June, Frinovsky and the head of the Red Army political directorate, Lev Mekhlis, were dispatched to the Far East to conduct mass arrests, and to spy on Blyukher. He was arrested on 22 October, by which time Frinovsky had been dismissed and the NKVD was effectively controlled by Lavrentiy Beria.

It was long believed that Blyukher was secretly tried, convicted of spying for Japan, and executed. In 1939 Chiang Kai-shek inquired about Blyukher's whereabouts in a meeting with Stalin, and asked if he could return to help the Nationalists. Stalin replied that the general had been executed for helping a Japanese spy.

As early as February 1956, it was secretly reported to the party leadership, by a commission appointed to investigate the purges, that a former officer had seen Blyukher while he was under interrogation, and that "his whole face was swollen and covered in bruises." Unlike most prisoners subjected to this kind of torture, he did not sign a false confession, but after 18 days of torture, he died from his injuries, on 9 November 1938. His body was cremated the same day. The cause of his death was first reported in 1989, in Izvestia. The officer who beat Blyukher to death has been named as Lev Shvartzman.

Blyukher was rehabilitated in 1956.

He continues to be a popular figure in Russia, and a documentary film on his life and several publications by family members have appeared.

== Honours and awards ==
- Two Orders of Lenin (1931, 1938)
- Order of Red Banner of RSFSR, three times
  - Resolution of the Central Executive Committee on 30 September 1918, presented 11 May 1919 by the Special Representative at the headquarters of the Central Executive Committee of the 3rd Army on the Eastern Front;
  - Order 197 of 14 June 1921—for the battles on the Eastern Front, the 30th Infantry Division;
  - Order 221 of RVSR, 20 June 1921—for the assault on Perekop at the Perekop Isthmus by 51st Infantry Division;
- Order of Red Banner of the USSR, twice
  - Order RVS USSR 664 of 25 October 1928—for the defence of the Kakhovka bridgehead;
  - Order RVS USSR 101 1928—in commemoration of the 10th anniversary of the Red Army;
- Order of the Red Star (1930)
- Jubilee Medal XX Years of the Workers' and Peasants' Red Army (1938)
- Badge "5 years of the Cheka-GPU" (1932)
- Cross of St. George, 3rd and 4th classes
- Medal of St. George

== See also ==
- Outline of the Russian Revolution and Civil War
- Bibliography of the Russian Revolution and Civil War
- Bibliography of Stalinism and the Soviet Union
- Index of Old Bolsheviks
- Index of articles related to the Russian Revolution and Civil War
