= Green Ukraine =

Historical Ukrainian name for land in the southern Russian Far East

Coordinates: 51.3°N 133.4°E

Green Ukraine, (Note: Ukrainian: Зелена Україна, romanized: Zelena Ukraina Russian: Зелёная Украина, romanized: Zelyonaya Ukraina) also known as Zelenyi Klyn (Note: Ukrainian: Зелений клин, romanized: Zelenyi Klyn, lit. '[the] green gore/wedge' Russian: Зелёный Клин, romanized: Zelyonyy Klin) or Zakytaishchyna, (Note: Ukrainian: Закитайщина, lit. 'Trans China') (Note: The flag of Green Ukraine appears to be a play on words on the concept of a "green wedge" combined with traditional Ukrainian colors. Ukrainian parlance also referred to other ethnic enclaves as "wedges" – note that Yellow Ukraine, Grey Ukraine, Pink Ukraine – compare Ukrainian historical regions.) is a historical Ukrainian name for the land in the Russian Far East area between the Amur River and the Pacific Ocean — an area roughly corresponding to Outer Manchuria. This toponym comes from the area's significant Ukrainian population, who migrated eastward as settlers during Russian Imperial expansion to the east.

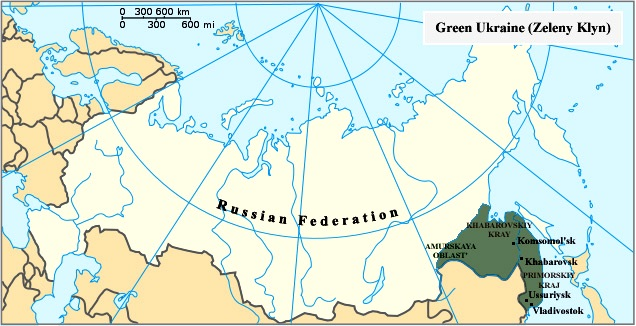
Zeleny Klyn on the map of Russia

After the Russian Revolution of 1917, Transcathay (Ukrainian: Закитайщина, romanized: Zakytaishchyna) was a projected country in the Russian Far East.

After the establishment of the Bolshevik Far Eastern Republic on April 6, 1920, Far Eastern areas with an ethnic Ukrainian majority attempted to secede and establish Green Ukraine as an ethnostate. This movement quickly proved abortive.

Geographically, Green Ukraine borders the present-day North Korea, in the special city of Rason and the Chinese provinces of Heilongjiang and Jilin.

== Geography ==
The Green Ukraine was located in the Outer Manchuria, extending across Amur River, Zeya, Svobodny, Blagoveshchensk, Ussuriland, to the north, Nikolayevsk-on-Amur, Khabarovsk, and Vladivostok to the south. The Green Ukraine had a roughly 2,500 km coastline along the Pacific Ocean that extended from the Sea of Japan, to the Sea of Okhotsk. Green Ukraine was nearby the Sakhalin island and the Japanese archipelago. The region encompassed approximately 1,000,000 square kilometers. Nearby areas of Kamchatka and Sakhalin oblasts have also been sometimes included into the territory of Green Ukraine.

Most of the region's territory is covered by mountains and plateaus dissected by numerous rivers. Except of the highest mountain areas, the landscape of Green Ukraine consists of taiga forests. In the north, its territory is separated from Yakutia by Stanovoy Range, with heights up to 2,412 meters. In the east the range is bordered by Dzhugdzhur mountains, and in the south it is separated by the valleys of Zeya and Gilyuy from the Yankan-Tukuryngra mountains (maximum heights of 1,840 meters). Both ridges emerged during the Precambrian era. Further south the Amur–Zeya Plain adjoins the Zeya-Bureya Lowland, whose fertile soils made it a major location for Ukrainian settlement. To the east, the lowland is bordered by Khingan-Bureya mountains, which formed during the Palaeozoic era. Another valley is located between the aforementioned range and Sikhote-Alin mountains along the Amur, Ussuri and Suifun rivers and around Lake Khanka, bordered by Peter the Great Gulf in the south. Despite some swampy areas, the valley is characterized by fertile soils and a warm climate, making it another magnet for Ukrainian settlers. The coastal areas between Sikhote-Alin and the Sea of Japan is strongly dissected, making them mostly unsuitable for establishment of ports.

Green Ukraine is located in an area with a temperate monsoon climate, which is characterized by cold, dry winters and hot, humid summers with large temperature amplitudes. The northwestern part of the region is covered by permafrost. Most of the area is covered by podzol and bog soils. Green Ukraine lies almost entirely in the drainage basin of Amur river, whose middle flow contains many flood-meadows. Typical plants of the region include Ezo spruce, Erman's birch, silver fir, Daurian larch, Daurian larch, Mongolian oak, elm, sycamore, maple, Asian hazel, lespedeza, willow and poplar. The animal world is represented by endemic species including moose, musk deer, sable, brown bear, ermine, mountain hare, reindeer, Siberian tiger, black bear, leopard, spotted deer, wild boar, pheasant, crested ibis, Daurian ground squirrel, Manchurian hare, steppe polecat and others. Many of the animal species have been decimated by hunting and can only be found in natural reserves.

== History ==
Zelenyi Klyn is a term used by Ukrainian settlers to describe the Russian Far East in between the Amur and the Pacific. This area of land, while traditionally home to a number of indigenous Siberian and Manchurian people groups, was settled by a somewhat significant number of Ukrainians during the Tsardom of Russia's eastward conquest and colonization of Siberia. The territory consists of over 1,000,000 square kilometres and has a population of 3.1 million (1958). The Ukrainian population in 1897 made up 15% of the Primorskaya Oblast's population. The region's name is likely inspired by the abundance of forests in the area.

=== Start of Ukrainian settlement ===
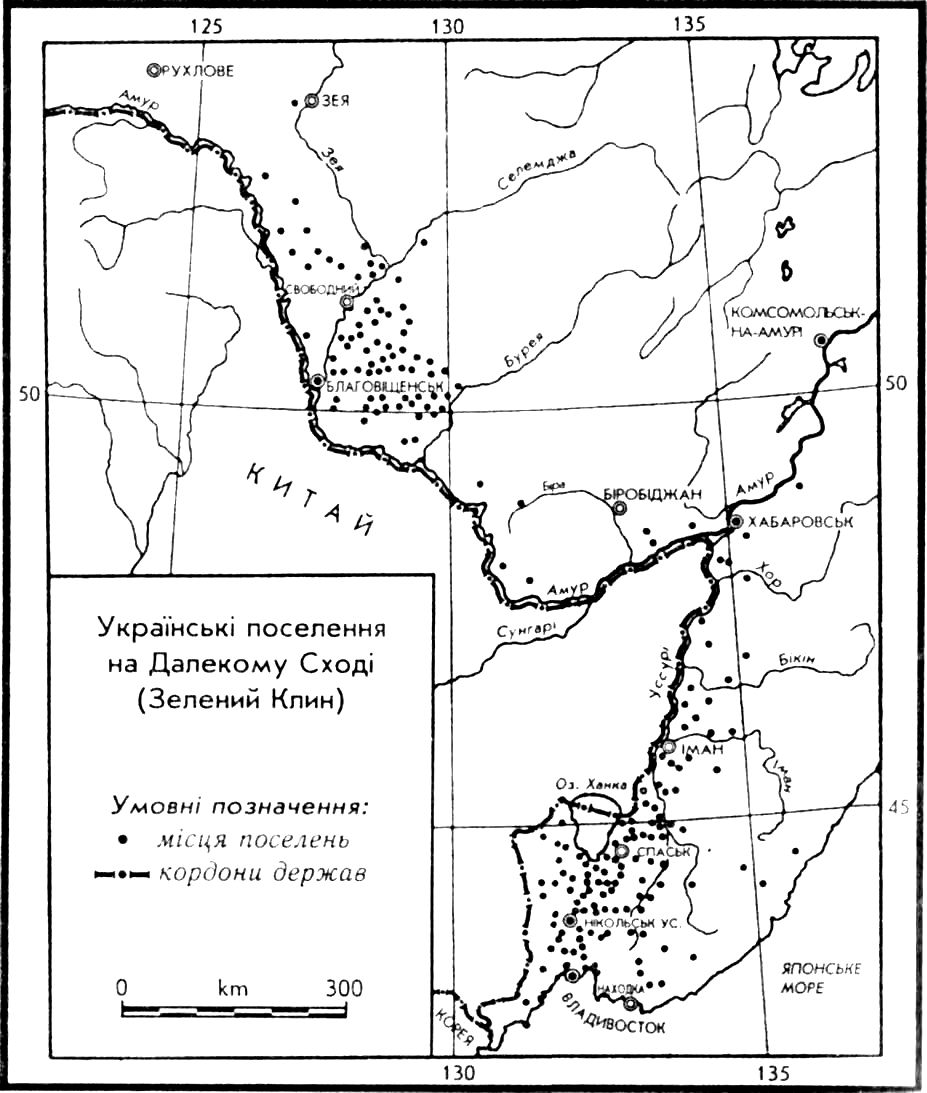
Map of Ukrainian settlements in the Far East from a publication by Ivan Bahrianyi

Zelenyi Klyn became part of the Russian Empire much later than Siberia and other parts of the Far East. The first attempts at colonizing the area date back to the mid-17th century when Yerofey Khabarov founded the fort of Albazin on the Amur river. From that time, constant skirmishes took place with the Manchu people of China. In 1689 China and Russia signed the Treaty of Nerchinsk, which granted Russia a limited territory in the upper flow of Amur.

In the mid 19th century, the second Russian expansion took place after Russia lost the Crimean War (1853–1856). Under the leadership of Mikhail Muravyov, later known as Muravyov-Amursky, a number of Cossack settlements were established on the Amur river. China had become far weaker than Russia at the time and ceded territory to Russia in the Treaty of Aigun of 1858 and by the Convention of Peking of 1860 (see Amur Annexation).

During this period, only a small number of settlers settled in the region consisting of some 14,000 Baikal Cossacks and 2,500 Russian soldiers. In 1861, two oblasts were established, the Primorsky and Amur; in 1881 they would be united under the power of a governor-general in Vladivostok. The establishment of cities in the area started, with Nikolayevsk-on-Amur being founded in 1850, Blagoveshchensk in 1856, Khabarovsk in 1858 and Vladivostok in 1860. However, until 1876 only 18,000 Cossacks resided in the area. Additionally, between 1859 and 1882 14,000 settlers arrived from other areas of the empire. The general population of the region as of 1880 remained below 100,000.

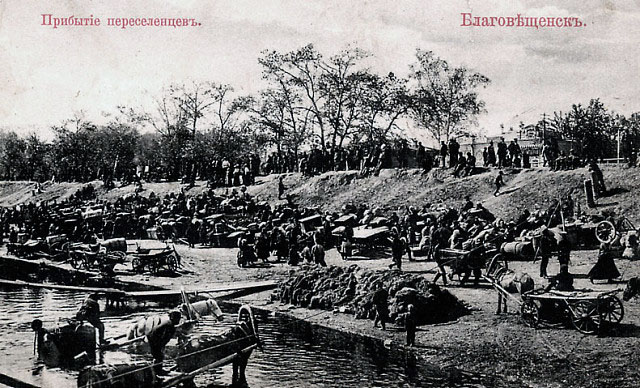
Arrival of settlers to Blagoveshchensk in the early 20th century

In 1882, free transportation to the area was announced by local governor Paul Simon Unterberger for settlers from Ukraine, who arrived through the port of Odesa and were offered free land in the Ussuri-Khanka valley. Unterberger's support for Ukrainian settlers was said to stem from his father's acquaintance with Taras Shevchenko. As a result of his policies, between 1883 and 1896 68,600 peasants, most of them Ukrainians, arrived to the Far East. Simultaneous Korean and Chinese settlement also took place in the region. As a result, by 1897 its population had increased to 310,000. With the establishment of railroad connection in 1901, over 14,000 settlers were moving to the area per year, with a maximum of 78,000 settlers arriving in 1907. Between 1907-1913 around 250,000 peasants settled in the region, over two-thirds of them Ukrainians. Additional arrival of industrial workers from Europe resulted in the area's population increasing to 940,000 in 1913.

Many of the initial Ukrainian settlers in the Far East stemmed from Chernigov Governorate, and this fact influenced the local architecture, dress and names of some settlements, which were typical for Left-bank Ukraine, for example Chernigovka. Ukrainian cultural and political life in the region before the Revolution of 1917 developed rather slowly. In 1907 and 1910 Ukrainian clubs were established in Kharbin and Blagoveshchensk. In Vladivostok a Ukrainian student society emerged in 1907, and an amateur Ukrainian theatre troupe was founded in 1909. An attempt to establish a branch of Prosvita in Nikolsk-Ussuriysky was aborted by the police.

=== Proposed state ===
Green Ukraine Зелений клин
- 1917–1922
- Proposed flag of Green Ukraine

- Map of the Green Ukraine based on a publication from 1931
- Head of government
  - 1918—1922: Yurii Hlushko
- Historical era: Russian Civil War
  - Established: 24 June 1917
  - Independence: April 1918
  - Disestablished: 1922
Preceded by	Succeeded by
Russian Republic	Far Eastern Republic
- Today part of: Russia: Far Eastern Federal District

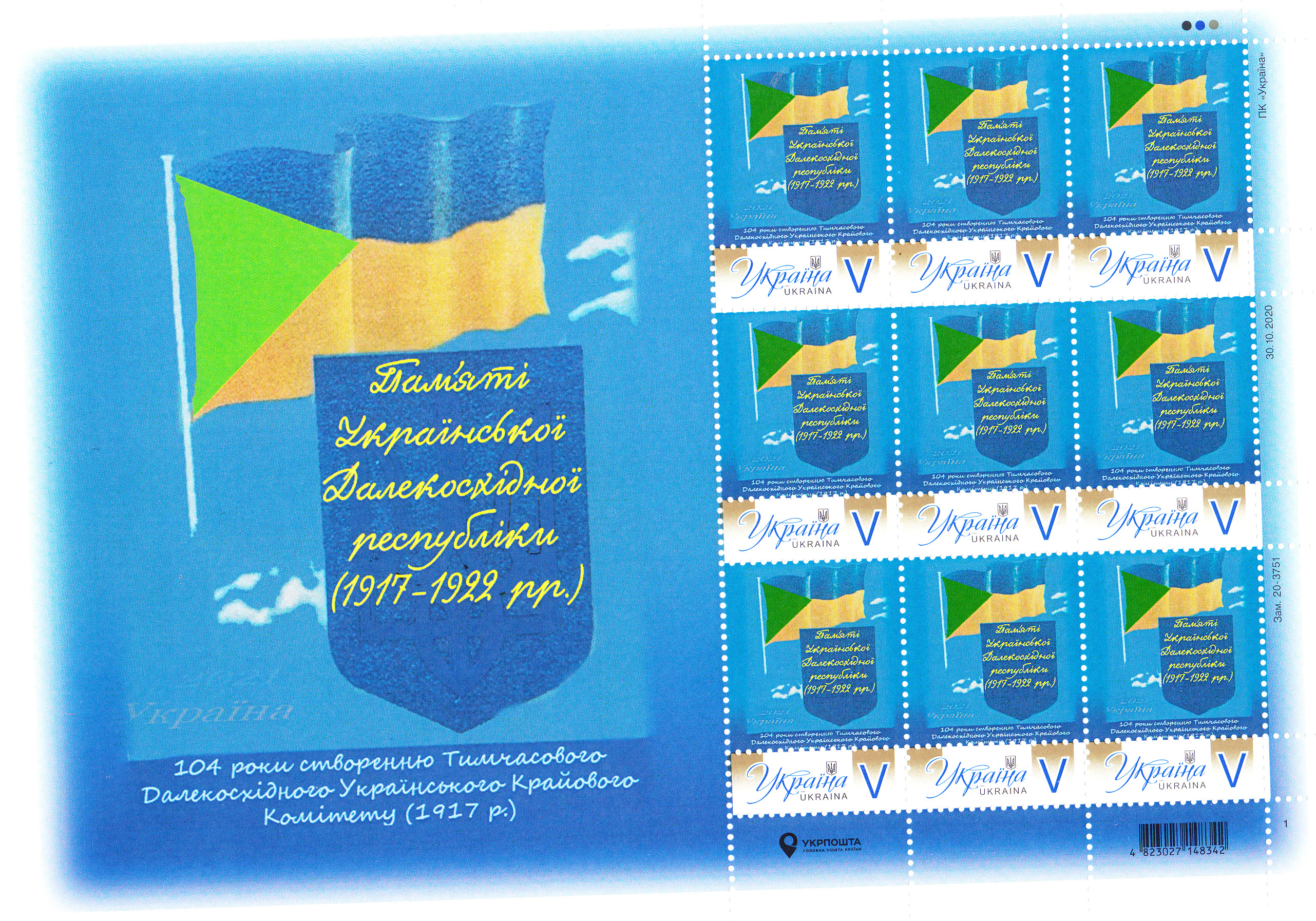
A set of postage stamps "In Memory of the Ukrainian Far Eastern Republic", Ukraine, 2021.

As a result of the February Revolution, limitations on social activities by Ukrainians were lifted, and several Ukrainian community organizations, cooperatives and military unions emerged in the Far East. On 24-27 (O.S. 11-14) June 1917, the First All-Ukrainian Far Eastern Congress took place in Nikolsk-Ussuriysky, forming the Far Eastern Krai Rada (Land Council) and issuing an appeal to the Provisional Government to recognize Ukrainian national autonomy in the region. In the aftermath, 10 district councils were established by the Ukrainian community, a teachers' union and a central cooperative organization were founded, and several Ukrainian newspapers and magazines started publishing. In June 1917 a Ukrainian sotnia left Vladivostok in order to take part in the defence of Ukraine.

Most of the region's Cossack population supported the Whites during the Russian Civil War. In January 1918 the Second All-Ukrainian Far Eastern Congress at Khabarovsk proclaimed Green Ukraine to be part of the Ukrainian State, in spite of the lack of geographical connection. After the Czechoslovak Legion mutiny and allied intervention, in April 1918 the area came under the jurisdiction of admiral Alexander Kolchak. Simultaneously, the Third All-Ukrainian Far Eastern Congress asked for the creation of an independent Ukrainian state on the Pacific Ocean. Between June 1918 and 1919, and then from January 1920 to 1922 the Far Eastern Secretariat was led by Ukrainian activist Yuri Hlushko-Mova. In summer 1918 more than 5,000 Ukrainians in the region were enlisted in the army by general Boris Khreschatitsky. On 11 April 1920 ataman Grigory Semyonov issued an order recognizing the right of Far Eastern Ukrainians for national self-determination and autonomy in the limits of a united Far Eastern state of Cossacks, Buryats, and Ukrainians. In 1920, the Far Eastern Republic was established as a buffer republic between Russia and Japan. 41 Ukrainian representatives took part in the republic's constituent assembly in March 1921, and a separate ministry for Ukrainian affairs was established, engaging in the development of Ukrainian schooling.

=== Later history ===
In November 1922 the Far Eastern Republic was occupied by the Bolsheviks and forced to merge with the Russian Soviet Federative Socialist Republic. In 1934, the Jewish Autonomous Oblast region was established with its capital at Birobidzhan. The new regime closed down all Ukrainian organizations, arresting their members and condemning many of them to long terms of imprisonment during a process in Chita. At the same time, the Soviets agreed to establish 17 Ukrainian national districts in the area, where schooling and administration were performed in the Ukrainian language. A daily newspaper in Ukrainian was issued, and between 1926 and 1932 a Ukrainian pedagogical institute was active in Blagoveschchensk.

However, starting from 1935 authorities adopted the policy of Russification and liquidated the Ukrainian cultural autonomy in the area. Simultaneously, in 1934 the Jewish Autonomous Oblast was established in the area of an earlier Jewish national district in Birobidzhan, in parallel with the deportation of most Chinese and Koreans from the area. During World War II, many Ukrainian evacuees arrived to the region, with many staying after the end of hostilities.

== Demographics ==
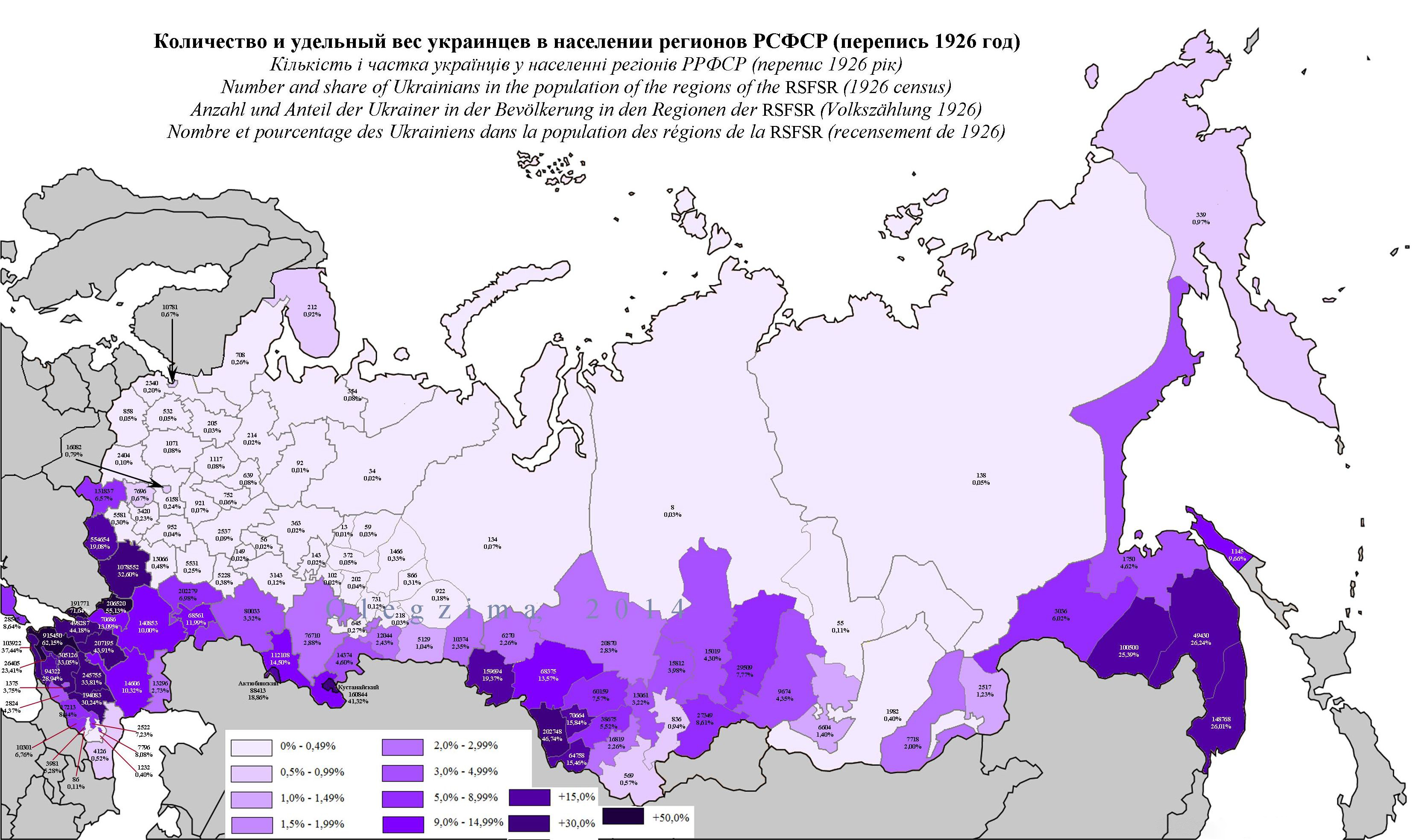
Number and share of Ukrainians in the population of the regions of the RSFSR (1926 census)

The area of future Green Ukraine had been sparsely populated before the start of Russian colonization. In the aftermath, its population swiftly increased, reaching the number of over 3 million by 1956. In 1926, 77,8% of the region's population consisted of East Slavic settlers and their descendants. During the Tsarist era, many Ukrainians joined the ranks of Amur Cossacks.

Most of the Slavic population were Christians. The local Tungusic peoples followed local religions; some Ashkenazi Jews in areas around the present-day Jewish Autonomous Oblast practiced Judaism.

== Economy and transport ==
The economy of the area has been traditionally based on gold production, fishing and hunting. Agriculture plays a secondary role due to the small area of arable lands and is concentrated around cultivation of wheat, oats, barley, buckwheat, maize, millet and rice, as well as potatoes, vegetables and soy. Animal husbandry is less developed and is based mostly on growing of cattle, pigs, sheep and goats. Fish species industrially produced in the region include herring, sardines and salmon. Crab hunting and whaling have also been historically important.

The presence of large forest areas has led to the development of forestry, wood and furniture industry. Along with gold, tin, zinc, molybdenum and coal are also produced in the region. During the Soviet period shipbuilding and sea trade have developed along with metallurgy and machine building, as well as construction and food industries. Power plants were established in the region's major cities during that time.

Since 1902, Vladivostok has been connected to Europe through the Chinese Eastern Railway, and from 1916 through the Trans-Siberian Railway. As a result, water transport has been gradually losing its importance.

== See also ==
- Grey Ukraine
- Yellow Ukraine
- Pink Ukraine
- Ukrainians in Russia
