= White émigré =

Russian subject who left Imperial Russia

The Imperial Russian tricolor, adopted by White Russian émigrés after the October Revolution, was later restored as the flag of the Russian Federation.

White émigrés (Russian: Белые эмигранты, romanized: Belyye émigranty) were Russians who emigrated from the territory of the former Russian Empire in the wake of the Russian Revolution and the Russian Civil War. They were in opposition to the revolutionary Bolshevik political climate. Many White Russian émigrés participated in the White movement or supported it. The term is often broadly applied to anyone who may have left the country due to the change in regimes.

Some white émigrés, like Mensheviks and Socialist-Revolutionaries, were opposed to the Bolsheviks but had not directly supported the White movement; some were apolitical. The term is also applied to the descendants of those who left and who still retain a Russian Orthodox Christian identity while living abroad.

The term "émigré" is most commonly used in France, the United States, and the United Kingdom. A term preferred by the émigrés themselves was "first-wave émigré"; (Note: эмигрантъ первой волны, эмигрант первой волны, emigrant pervoj volny, IPA: [ɪmʲɪˈɡrant ˈpʲervəj vɐlˈnɨ]) "Russian émigrés" (Note: русская эмиграція, русская эмиграция, russkaja emigracija, [ˈruskəjə ɪmʲɪˈɡrat͡sɨjə]) or "Russian military émigrés" (Note: русская военная эмиграція, русская военная эмиграция, russkaja vojennaja emigracija, [ˈruskəjə vɐˈjenːəjə ɪmʲɪˈɡrat͡sɨjə]) if they participated in the White movement. In the Soviet Union, the term "white émigré" (Note: бѣлоэмигрантъ, белоэмигрант, beloemigrant, [ˌbʲeləɪmʲɪˈɡrant]) generally had negative connotations.

Since the end of the 1980s, the term "first-wave émigré" has become more common in Russia. In East Asia, the term "White Russian" (Note: Chinese: 白俄; pinyin: bái'é; Cantonese Yale: baahk ngòh; Dungan: бый ә; IPA: [pǎɪ.ɤ̌]; Japanese: 白系露人, Hakkeirojin, Хаккейрозин, [hak̚kei̯ɾod͡ʑiɴ]; Korean: 백계 로씨야족; Hanja: 白系 로씨야族; RR: baekgye Rossiya-jok; MR: paekkye Rossiya-chok, KS: пэкке Россия-чок, IPA: [pɛk̚k͈je ɾoɕ͈ija.tɕok̚]; Mongolian: ᠴᠠᠭᠠᠨ ᠣᠷᠤᠰ, romanized: cagaan oros, cyrillized: цагаан орос, pronounced [t͡sʰaʁáːɴ ɔrə̆s]; Uyghur: ئاق رۇس, romanized: Aq rus, cyrillized: Ақ рус) is the term most commonly used for such Russian émigrés, although some have been of Ukrainian and other ethnicities, and were not culturally Russians.

Most white émigrés left Russia from 1917 to 1920 (estimates vary between 900,000 and 2 million). Some managed to leave during the 1920s and 1930s, or were expelled by the Soviet government (such as, for example, Pitirim Sorokin and Ivan Ilyin). They spanned all classes and included military soldiers and officers, Cossacks, intellectuals of various professions, dispossessed businessmen and landowners, as well as officials of the Russian Imperial government and of various anti-Bolshevik governments during the Russian Civil War. Not all of them were ethnic Russians; other ethnic groups were included.

== Distribution ==
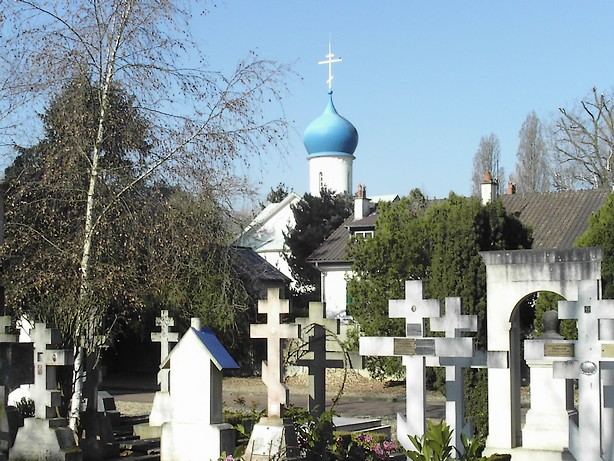
Sainte-Geneviève-des-Bois Russian Cemetery in Sainte-Geneviève-des-Bois, Essonne, France, near Paris, is a necropolis of White Russians.

Most émigrés initially fled from Southern Russia and Ukraine to Turkey and then moved to other Slavic countries in Europe (the Kingdom of Yugoslavia, Bulgaria, Czechoslovakia, and Poland). A large number also moved to Israel, Estonia, Latvia, Lithuania, Finland, Iran, Germany and France. Some émigrés also fled to Portugal, Spain, Romania, Belgium, Sweden, Switzerland, and Italy. Berlin and Paris developed thriving émigré communities.

Many military and civil officers living, stationed, or fighting the Red Army across Siberia and the Russian Far East moved together with their families to Harbin (see Harbin Russians), to Shanghai (see Shanghai Russians) and to other cities of China, Central Asia, and Western China. After the withdrawal of American and Japanese troops from Siberia, some émigrés traveled to Japan.

During and after World War II, many Russian émigrés moved to the United Kingdom, the United States, Canada, Peru, Brazil, Mexico, Argentina, Chile, Colombia, Taiwan, Australia and New Zealand — where many of their communities still exist in the 21st century. Thousands of emigres, of them 3,000 to 5,000 on the Eastern Front, served Germany in the Wehrmacht or in the Waffen-SS, often as interpreters.

== Ideological inclinations ==
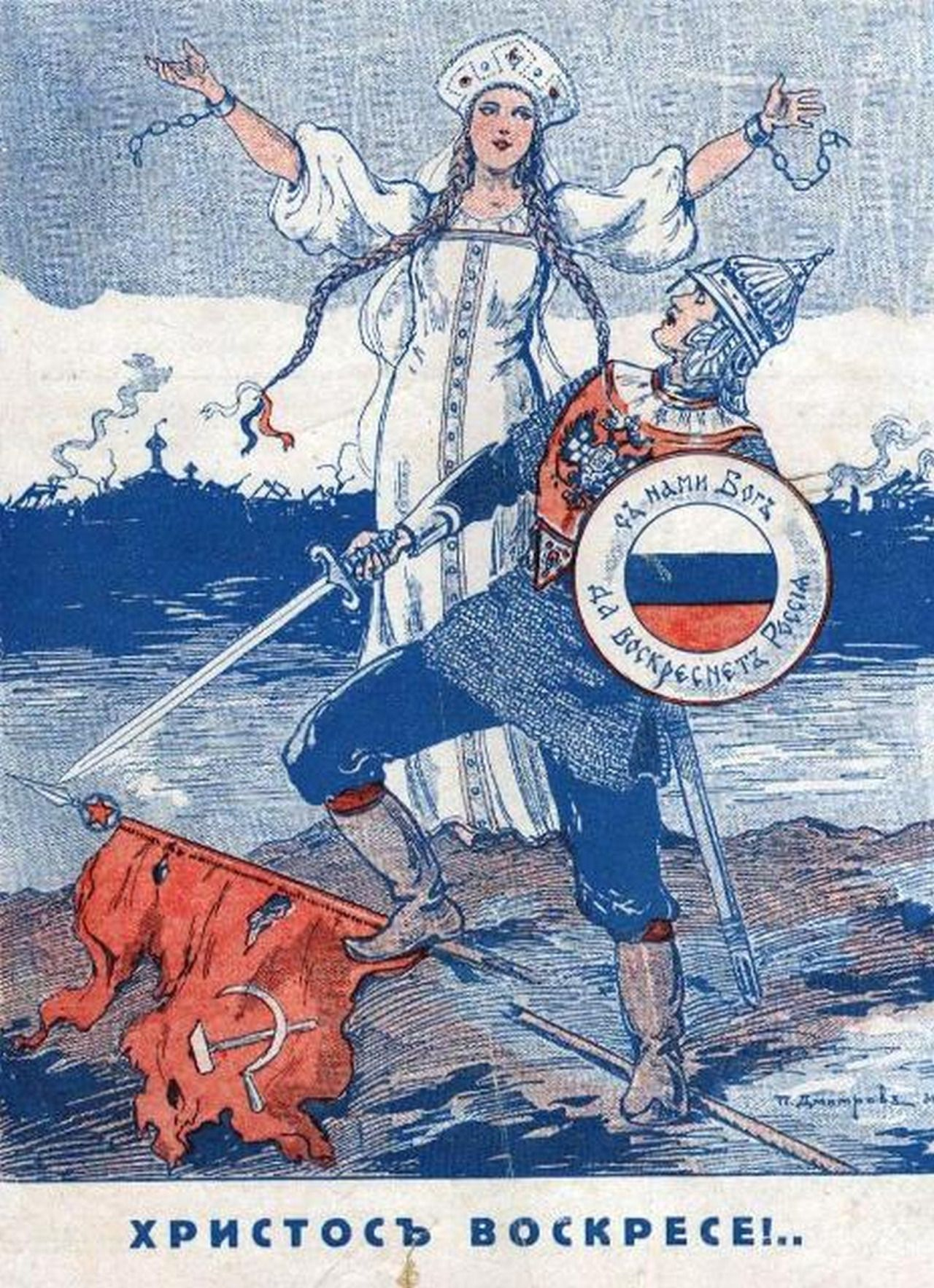
White propaganda poster, c. 1932; the text at the bottom, in Church Slavonic, reads "Christ Is Risen!.."; the top of the shield reads "God is with us", and the lower half "Let Russia arise", echoing "Let God arise" from Psalm 67 (68 in Western numbering)

White émigrés were, generally speaking, anti-communist and did not consider the Soviet Union and its legacy to be representative of Russia but rather of an occupying force. They consider the period of 1917 to 1991 to have been a period of anti-Christian occupation by the Soviet regime. They used the pre-revolutionary tricolor (white-blue-red) as their flag, for example, and some organizations used the ensign of the Imperial Russian Navy.

A significant percentage of white émigrés may be described as monarchists, although many adopted a position of being "unpredetermined", believing that Russia's political structure should be determined by popular plebiscite.

Many white émigrés believed that their mission was to preserve the pre-revolutionary Russian culture and way of life while living abroad, in order to return this influence to Russian culture after the fall of the USSR. Many symbols of the White émigrés were reintroduced as symbols of the post-Soviet Russia, such as the Byzantine eagle and the Russian tricolor.

A religious mission to the outside world was another concept promoted by people such as Bishop John of Shanghai and San Francisco (canonized as a saint of the Russian Orthodox Church Abroad) who said at the 1938 All-Diaspora Council:

To the Russians abroad it has been granted to shine in the whole world with the light of Orthodoxy, so that other peoples, seeing their good deeds, might glorify our Father Who is in Heaven, and thus obtain salvation for themselves.

Many white émigrés also believed it was their duty to remain active in combat against the Soviet Union, with the hopes of liberating Russia. This ideology was largely inspired by General Pyotr Wrangel, who said upon the White army's defeat "The battle for Russia has not ceased, it has merely taken on new forms".

White army veteran Captain Vasili Orekhov, publisher of the magazine Sentry (Chasovoy), encapsulated this idea of responsibility with the following words:

There will be an hour – believe it – there will be, when the liberated Russia will ask each of us: "What have you done to accelerate my rebirth." Let us earn the right not to blush, but be proud of our existence abroad. As being temporarily deprived of our Motherland let us save in our ranks not only faith in her, but an unbending desire towards feats, sacrifice, and the establishment of a united friendly family of those who did not let down their hands in the fight for her liberation

== Organizations and activities ==
Emblem used by white émigré volunteers in the Spanish Civil War.

The émigrés formed various organizations for the purpose of combating the Soviet regime such as the Russian All-Military Union, the Brotherhood of Russian Truth, and the NTS. This made the white émigrés a target for infiltration by the Soviet secret police (e.g. operation TREST and the Inner Line). Dozens of White Army veterans (numbers vary from 72 to 180) served as volunteers supporting Francisco Franco during the Spanish Civil War. Some white émigrés, labeled "Soviet patriots," adopted pro-Soviet sympathies. These people formed organizations such as the Mladorossi, the Evraziitsi, and the Smenovekhovtsy. After 1933, there were attempts to copy the NSDAP and cozy up to the German National Socialists, thus the short-lived parties such as the ROND (Russian Popular Liberation Movement) came into existence in Germany.

One of the most notable forms of activities by Russian émigrés was building monuments to Russian war dead of World War I, which stood in marked contrast to the Soviet Union, which did not build any monuments to the 2 million Russians killed between 1914 and 1917, as the war had been condemned by Lenin as an "imperialist war". Besides for the war dead, other monuments were put up. In Brussels, Seattle, and Harbin, monuments were built to honor the executed Emperor Nicholas II while a monument was put up in Shanghai to honor Alexander Pushkin, Russia's national poet. In fact, a monument to Pushkin would have been built in Paris had not a dispute arisen with the Ministry of Fine Arts over its precise location. The popularity of monuments for the war dead reflected not only sadness over the war dead, but also a way to bring together the often badly divided émigré communities shattered across Europe, Asia and North America. Monuments for the war dead were often a way to symbolically recreate Russia abroad with example at the monument for those Russians killed while serving in the Russian Expeditionary Force (REF) in France at village of Mourmelon-le-Grand having a hermitage built near it together with transplanted fir trees and a Russian style farm to make it look like home. To build community consensus around the war memorials, the design of the memorials were deliberately kept simple, with no sculpture which could be given a symbolic meaning, thereby ensuring that no particular interpretation of the war could be put forward other than grief over the war dead. The design of Orthodox churches at the war memorials was done in the style of medieval Orthodox churches in Novgorod and Pskov as this architectural style was seen as politically neutral and hence able to bring the communities together better.

Both left-wing and right-wing émigrés who otherwise passionately disagreed came together to honor the war dead of World War I, which was virtually the only occasions when overseas Russian communities could all come together, explaining why such memorial services were so important to the émigré communities. The neo-classical style which typically adorned war memorials in Imperial Russia was consciously avoided as building a war memorial in that style was viewed as expressing support for restoring the monarchy. The sense of loss was not only for those the war monuments honored, but due to the sense of loss caused by defeat. As a columnist in an émigré newspaper in Paris wrote about the dedication of a memorial to the REF in 1930: "We lost everything – family, economic situation, personal happiness, the homeland...Are our sufferings good to anyone? In truth-we have nothing, we have lost everything. Weep, weep". Such monuments were also a way of commanding respect from the host communities with an émigré newspaper saying in 1930: "Peoples honor heroes. To the living: care, to the dead: memory. We in a foreign land do not have a tomb of an 'unknown soldier', but we do have thousands of suffering people. They are our honor and our justification before the world. Their wounds and suffering are for Russia. They remain true to honor and obligation. That is our Russian passport".

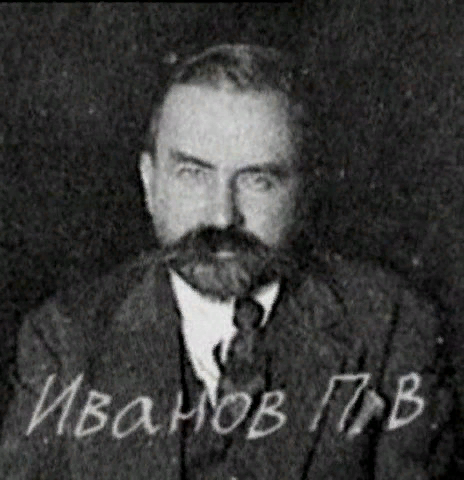
Yevgeny Miller, one of the remaining leaders of the White movement, was abducted from Paris by the NKVD in 1937 and executed in Moscow 19 months later during Stalin's Great Purge.

This was especially the case in France, the home of the largest overseas Russian community, where services honoring the events of World War I were a major part of French life after 1918, and where by honoring the Russian war dead allowed the Russian émigrés in France to take part in the ceremonials, letting the émigrés feel like a part of the wider French community. In 1927, the Orthodox Metropolitan Evlogii spoke at the war monument in Valenciennes: "Blood spilled on the soil of beautiful and glorious France is the best atmosphere to unite France forever with a Russia national and worthy". The fact that the crosses of the Russians buried in France were painted white-the color of the French war dead and allies-while the crosses of the German war dead were painted black was widely noticed within the Russian community in France as a sign that the French regarded them as allies. In Czechoslovakia and Yugoslavia, war memorials to the Russian war dead were presented in Pan-Slavic terms, as a symbol of how Russians had fought together with the Czechs and Serbs in the war. Serbian King Alexander of Yugoslavia was a Russophile who welcomed Russian émigrés to his kingdom, and after France, Yugoslavia had the largest Russian émigré community, leading to Yugoslavia to have almost as many war memorials to the Russian war dead as France. War memorials in Yugoslavia usually also honored both Serbian war dead and the members of the Czechoslovak Legions who died in the war, giving them a decidedly pan-Slavic feel. A planned Orthodox church to honor the Russian prisoners who died in an Austrian POW camp outside Osijek would have featured busts of the Emperor Nicholas II, King Peter I and King Alexander to emphasis how the Houses of Romanov and Karađorđević had been allied in the war, linking the Russian and Serbian experiences of the war.

Between 1934 and 1936, an ossuary containing the bones of Russian soldiers killed all over the world was built in the Novo Groblje cemetery in Belgrade, which used to illustrate the theme of Serbian-Russian friendship, and which King Alexander contributed 5,000 dinars to meet the construction costs. When the memorial was opened in 1936, the Patriarch Varnava of the Serbian Orthodox Church declared in a speech opening it: "The Russians bore great sacrifices on our account wishing to defend Serbs at a time when powerful enemies attacked tiny Serbia from all sides. And the great Slavic soul of the Russians did not allow it to be looked upon with indifference that a fraternal Slavic people should perish". Karel Kramář, a wealthy conservative Czechoslovak politician and a Russophile worked together with Russian émigrés to build an Orthodox church in Prague which Kramář called in his opening speech "a monument of Slavic connection" and to "remind Russians not only of their former sufferings but also about the recognition on the side of the Slavs". A service at the Russian war memorial in Terezin in 1930 turned into "a Russian-Czech political demonstration in a manifestation of Slavic mutuality" with the theme that the Russians had died so that the Czechs might be free. Prague had a large community of Russian émigrés, and by constantly linking the Russian experience of World War I to the experiences of the Czechoslovak Legions was a way of asserting that the Russians had helped to make Czechoslovakia possible. In Germany, right-wing émigrés found much to their own frustration that right-wing German veterans shunned their offers to participate in Totensonntag ("Day of the Dead") as German conservatives did not wish to honor the sacrifices of those who had fought against Germany, and it was left-wing German veterans, usually associated with Social Democratic Party, who welcomed having Russians participate in Totensonntag to illustrate the theme that all peoples in the nations involved in the First World war were victims. In Germany, 11 November was not a holiday as no one wanted to honor the day that the Reich lost the war, and Totensonntag played the same role in Germany that 11 November played in the Allied nations, as the time to honor the war dead. The anti-war and internationalist message at the Totensonntag ceremonies organized by the SPD did not sit well with right-wing Russian émigrés, who found themselves rather out of place at these ceremonies.

The city of Harbin in China was founded by the Russians in 1896, becoming known the "Moscow of the Orient" due to its Russian appearance, and after the Revolution its Russian population was further reinforced by émigrés, through the majority of the Russians living in Harbin were people who had come before World War I. About 127,000 people living in Harbin in 1920 came from Russia, making it one of the largest Russian-speaking cites in East Asia. Many of the Russians in Harbin were wealthy, and the city was a center of Russian culture as the Russian community in Harbin made it their mission to preserve the pre-war Russian culture in a city on the plains of Manchuria with for instance Harbin having two opera companies and numerous theaters performing the traditional classics of the Russian stage. The economic success of the Russians in Harbin often surprised foreign visitors who assumed that they should be poor, leading one visitor in 1923 to comment that Russian "ladies as well gowned as at the Paris races [who] strolled with men faultlessly garbed by European standards", leading him to wonder how they achieved this "deceptive appearance". The extent of Russian economic dominance of Harbin could be seen that "Moya-tvoya", a pidgin language combining aspects of Russian and Mandarin Chinese which developed in the 19th century when Chinese went to work in Siberia, was considered essential by the Chinese merchants of Harbin.

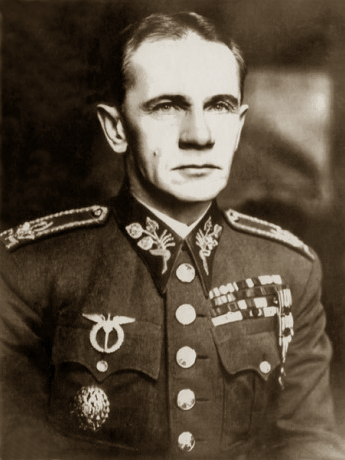
Former Tsarist officer Sergey Voytsekhovsky as Army General of the Czechoslovak Republic, 1938. In May 1945, he was kidnapped by SMERSH and died in the Soviet Gulag in 1951.

White émigrés fought with the Soviet Red Army during the Soviet invasion of Xinjiang and the Xinjiang War of 1937. During the German invasion of France in 1940, about 10,000 White Russians were serving in the French Army.

During World War II, many white émigrés took part in the Russian Liberation Movement. The main reason that pushed the Whites to support the German power with action was the concept of a "spring offensive", an armed intervention against the USSR that must be exploited in order to continue the civil war. The latter was perceived by many Russian officers as an ongoing case that was never finished since the day of their exile. During the war, the white émigrés came into contact with former Soviet citizens from German-occupied territories who used the German retreat as an opportunity to either flee from the Soviet Union, or were in Germany and Austria as POWs and forced labor, and preferred to stay in the West, often referred to as the second wave of émigrés (often also called DPs – displaced persons, see Displaced persons camp). This smaller second wave fairly quickly began to assimilate into the white émigré community.

After the war, active anti-Soviet combat was almost exclusively continued by NTS: other organizations either dissolved, or began concentrating exclusively on self-preservation and/or educating the youth. Various youth organizations, such as the Scouts-in-Exile became functional in raising children with a background in pre-Soviet Russian culture and heritage.

The white émigrés formed the Russian Orthodox Church Abroad in 1924. The church continues its existence to this day, acting as both the spiritual and cultural center of the Russian Orthodox community abroad. On 17 May 2007, the Act of Canonical Communion with the Moscow Patriarchate reestablished canonical ties between the Russian Orthodox Church Abroad and the Russian Church of the Moscow Patriarchate, after more than 80 years of separation.

== In China ==
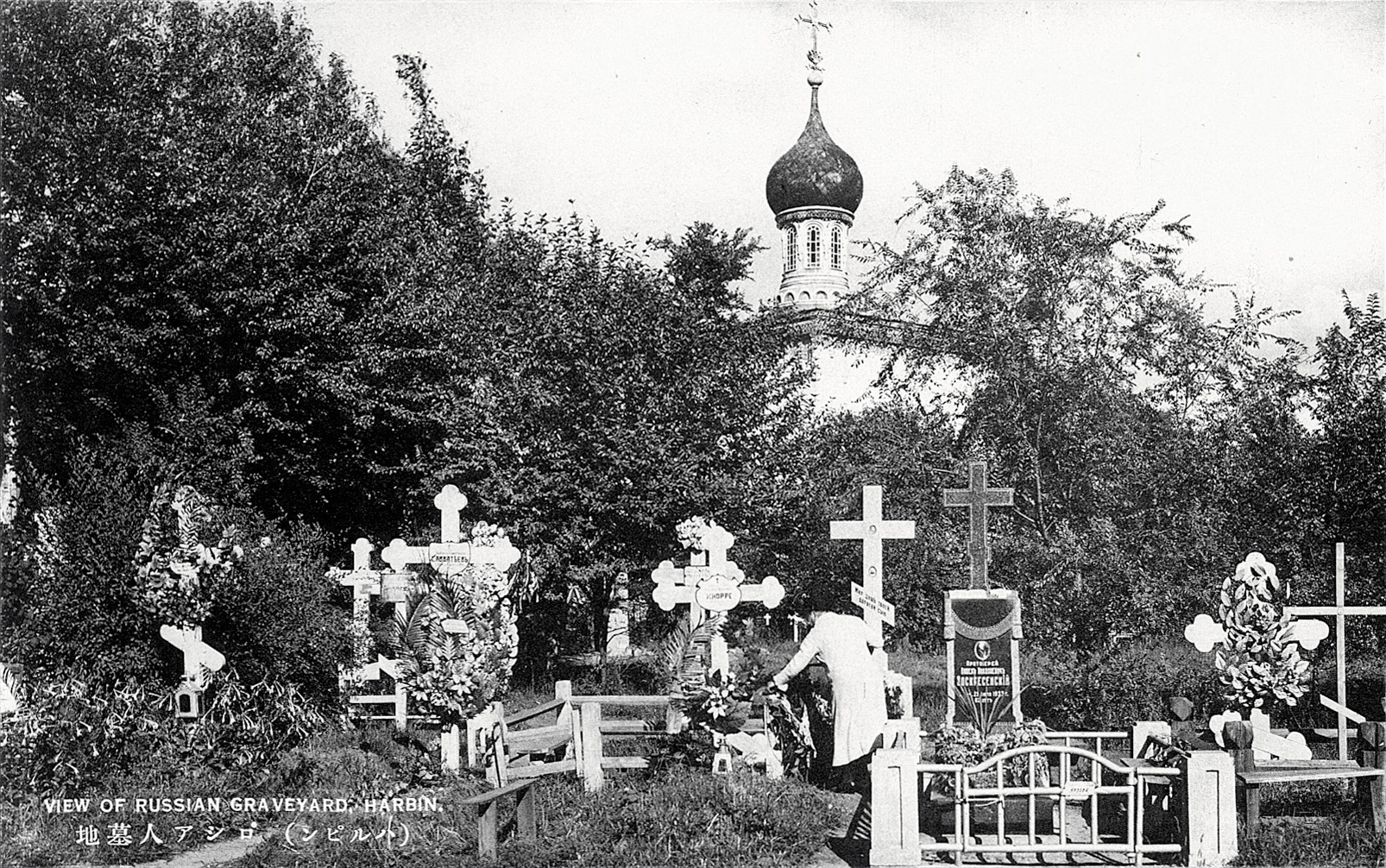
Russian orthodox churchyard in Harbin, 1945

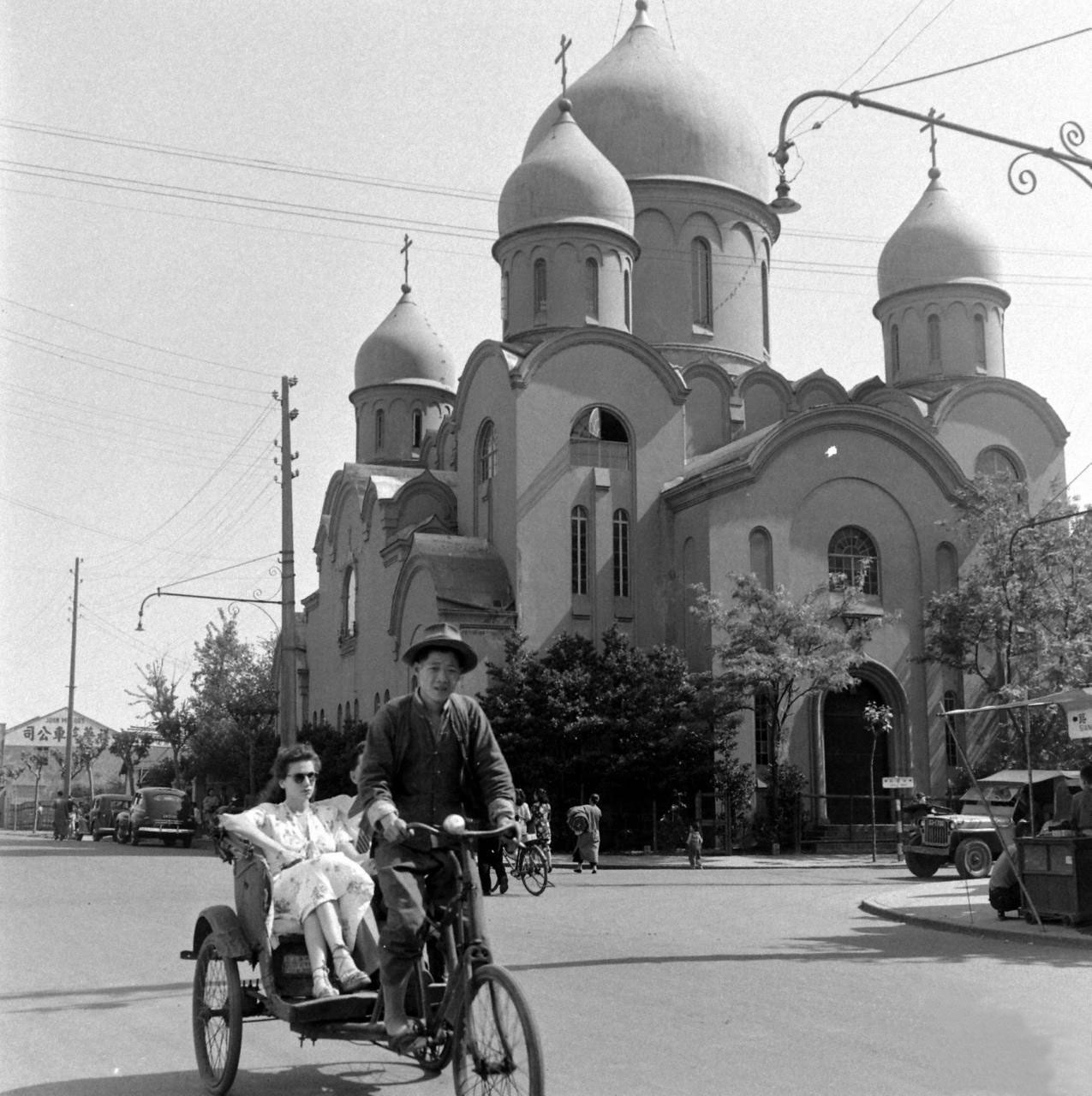
Russian Orthodox Church in Shanghai around 1948

White émigrés, called "White Russians" in East Asia, flooded into China after World War I and into the early 1920s. Most of the Russians went to Manchuria (especially in Harbin, which at the time had the largest population of Russians of any city outside Russia) and treaty ports such as Shanghai, but a few ended up in Beijing. In 1924, the Chinese government recognized the government of the Soviet Union and the majority of White Russians in China who refused to become Soviet citizens were rendered stateless, thus subject to Chinese law unlike other Europeans, Americans, and Japanese living in China who enjoyed the principles of extraterritoriality. Nor were White Russians born in China eligible to be Chinese citizens.

Although some of the White Russians arrived with their fortunes intact, most were penniless and due to ethnic prejudices and their inability to speak Chinese, were unable to find jobs. To support themselves and their families, some of the younger women became prostitutes or taxi dancers. They were popular with both foreign men, there being a shortage of foreign women, and Chinese men. A League of Nations survey in Shanghai in 1935 found that 22% of Russian women between 16 and 45 years of age were engaging in prostitution to some extent.

The White Russian women mostly worked in the "Badlands" area adjoining the Beijing Legation Quarter on the east, centered on the alley of Chuanban Hutong. The American explorer Roy Chapman Andrews said he frequented the "cafes of somewhat dubious reputation" with the explorer Sven Hedin and scientist Davidson Black to "have scrambled eggs and dance with the Russian girls."

Some did find professional work, teaching music or French. Other women took work as dressmakers, shop assistants and hairdressers. Many men became career soldiers of the Shanghai Russian Regiment, the only professional/standing unit within the Shanghai Volunteer Corps. By slow degrees, and despite the many difficulties, the community not only retained a good deal of cohesion but did begin to flourish, both economically and culturally. By the mid-1930s there were two Russian schools, as well as a variety of cultural and sporting clubs. There were Russian-language newspapers and a radio station. An important part was also played by the local Russian Orthodox Church under the guidance of St. John of Shanghai and San Francisco.

=== Under Chinese warlords ===
Owing to their service in World War I and the ensuing civil war in Russia, some Chinese warlord armies such as the Fengtian Clique hired White Russian mercenaries. The most highly paid of these Russian mercenaries was led by Konstantin Nechaev, who fought for Zhang Zongchang.

White Russian mercenaries under Pavel Pappengut defeated the New 36th Division on 21 February 1933 in the Battle of Ürümqi (1933). According to Wu K. Aitchen, a KMT official stationed in Xinjiang, 600 Uyghurs were slaughtered by White Russian mercenaries in the service of the Xinjiang clique warlord Jin Shuren. In 1935, Nicholas Vakar claimed that Jin Shuren would arrest Russian women to coerce their husbands into serving in Pappengut's army.

Chinese forces killed many White Russian and Soviet Russian soldiers fighting for the Second East Turkestan Republic during the Ili Rebellion in 1944–1946. Chinese forces also employed White Russians during the rebellion.

=== Under the Japanese ===
Japanese general Kenji Doihara forced White Russian women into prostitution and drug addiction to spy and spread drugs to their male Chinese clients. He initially gave food and shelter to tens of thousands Russian White émigré women who had taken refuge in the Far East after the defeat of the White Russian anti-Bolshevik movement during the Russian Civil War and the withdrawal of the Entente and Japanese armies from Siberia. Having lost their livelihoods, and with most of them widowed, Doihara forced the women into prostitution, using them to create a network of brothels throughout China where they worked under inhuman conditions. The use of heroin and opium was promoted to them as a way to tolerate their miserable fate. Once addicted, the women were used to further spread the use of opium among the Chinese population by earning one free opium pipe for every six they were selling to Chinese customers.

Japanese scientists conducted human experiments on White Russian men, women and children by gassing, injecting and vivisecting them in Unit 731 and Unit 100. There were multiple Russian victims of Unit 731 and testimonies and records show that a Russian girl and her mother were gassed and one Russian man was cut in two and preserved with formaldehyde.

Some children grew up inside the walls of Unit 731, infected with syphilis. A Youth Corps member deployed to train at Unit 731 recalled viewing a batch of subjects that would undergo syphilis testing: "One was a White Russian woman with a daughter of four or five years of age, and the last was a White Russian woman with a boy of about six or seven." The children of these women were tested in ways similar to their parents, with specific emphasis on determining how longer infection periods affected the effectiveness of treatments.

Senior Sgt. Kazuo Mitomo described some of Unit 100's human experiments:

On some of the prisoners I experimented 5–6 times, testing the action of Korean bindweed, bactal and castor oil seeds. One of the prisoners of Russian nationality became so exhausted from the experiments that no more could be performed on him, and Matsui ordered me to kill that Russian by giving him an injection of potassium cyanide. After the injection, the man died at once. Bodies were buried in the unit's cattle cemetery.

Unit 100 staff poisoned and drugged Russians with heroin, castor oil, tobacco and other substances for weeks at a time. Some died during the experimentation. When survivors were determined to no longer be useful for experimentation and were complaining of illness, staff told them they would receive a shot of medicine, but instead executed them with potassium cyanide injections. Executions were also carried out by gunshots.

== In the Ottoman Empire ==
Approximately 150,000 White Russians, including princes, princesses, generals and senior officers, fled to the Ottoman Empire in the wake of the Revolution. Istanbul, which had a population of around 900,000 at that time, opened its doors to approximately 150 thousand White Russians. The parties to the war migration in 1917 were neither Crimean Turks nor Caucasian Muslims. This time, those who took refuge in Istanbul were the 'nobles' and soldiers of Tsarist Russia, who had fought the Ottomans for centuries. The immigration, which started with small groups at the end of 1917, grew with the loss of Crimea to the Bolsheviks in 1920. Tens of thousands of people who left their titles, money and palaces in Russia and came to Istanbul tried to hold on to life by dispersing all over the city. Some sold books, some handcrafted souvenirs and some flowers. The place, formerly known as Hristaki Passage, became known as Çiçek Pasajı after the Russian flower girls took up residence. Those who arrived in 1919 were better off economically. The first arrivals found some jobs in the French and British representations, commissions, or alongside them in civil service, translator, or even military or security units in Istanbul.

== In the Philippines ==
The Philippines welcomed 800 Russians fleeing the dangers of the Socialist Revolution of 1917. Many later migrated elsewhere, while some settled in Manila or other areas in the country, with 250 went to Mindanao to work in abaca plantations.

From 1949 to 1951, the Philippines under President Elpidio Quirino admitted 6,000 White Russians fleeing from China after the communist People's Republic of China was proclaimed in the region. They settled in Tubabao island in Guiuan, Samar.

== Notable "first-wave" émigrés ==
=== Political and religious figures ===
- Metropolitan Anthony of Sourozh
- Nikolai Avksentiev
- Vassily Balabanov
- Aleksei Aleksandrovich Bobrinsky
- Viktor Chernov
- Georges Florovsky
- Vladimir Frederiks
- Muhammed-Gabdulkhay Kurbangaliev
- Alexander Guchkov
- Alexander Halpern
- George Ignatieff
- John of Shanghai and San Francisco
- Alexander Lvovich Kazembek
- Alexander Kerensky
- Grand Duke Kirill Vladimirovich
- Aleksandr Konovalov
- Alexander Krivoshein
- Georgy Lvov
- Vasily Maklakov
- Mother Maria
- Nikolai Yevgenyevich Markov
- Pavel Milyukov
- Vladimir Dmitrievich Nabokov
- Aleksandr Naumov
- Grand Duke Nicholas Nikolaevich
- Aleksandr Aleksandrovich Rittikh
- Konstantin Rodzaevsky
- Mikhail Rodzianko
- Boris Savinkov
- Sergey Sazonov
- Alexander Schmemann
- Pyotr Shabelsky-Bork
- Pavlo Skoropadskyi
- Aleksandr Stishinsky
- Peter Struve
- Sergey Taboritsky
- Sergey Taskin
- Metropolitan Vitaly Ustinov
- Leonid Ustrugov
- Boris Vasilchikov
- Vladimir S. Voitinsky
- Max Erwin von Scheubner-Richter
- Vladimir Zenzinov
- Roman Gul
- Ivan Prokhanov
- Platon Rozhdestvensky
- Alexander Nemolovsky

=== Military figures ===
- Yakov Bagratuni
- Nikolai Baratov
- Mikhail Berens
- Pavel Bermondt-Avalov
- Lazar Bicherakhov
- Vasily Biskupsky
- Stanisław Bułak-Bałachowicz
- Anton Denikin
- Mikhail Diterikhs
- Alexander Dutov
- Vasily Flug
- Urzhin Garmaev
- Vasily Gurko
- Dmitry Horvat
- Mikhail Alexandrovich Kedrov
- Pavel Fyodorovich Keller
- Vladimir Kislitsin
- Pyotr Krasnov
- Constantine Kromiadi
- Alexander Kutepov
- Mikhail Kvetsinsky
- Anatoly Lieven
- Alexander Lukomsky
- Yevgeny Miller
- Viktorin Molchanov
- Konstantin Petrovich Nechaev
- Pavel Pappengut
- Viktor Pokrovsky
- Alexander Rodzyanko
- Anatoly Rogozhin
- Grigory Semyonov
- Andrei Shkuro
- Boris Shteifon
- Dmitry Shcherbachev
- Mikhail Skorodumov
- Boris Smyslovsky
- I. S. K. Soboleff
- Vsevolod Starosselsky
- Viktor Petrovich Taranovsky
- Sergei Wojciechowski
- Pyotr Nikolayevich Wrangel
- Mitchell WerBell III
- Ivan Yermachenka
- Nikolai Yudenich

=== Historians and philosophers ===
- Nikolai Berdyaev
- Sergey Bulgakov
- Ivan Ilyin
- Vladimir Lossky
- Dimitri Obolensky
- Michael Rostovtzeff
- Lev Shestov
- Pitirim Sorokin
- George Vernadsky
- Nicholas Zernov

=== Artists and writers ===
- Mark Aldanov
- André Andrejew
- Vladimir Antonov
- Arkady Averchenko
- Léon Bakst
- George Balanchine
- Alexandre Benois
- Nina Berberova
- Yul Brynner
- Ivan Bunin
- Raissa Calza
- Oleg Cassini
- Marc Chagall
- Feodor Chaliapin
- Michael Chekhov
- Alexandra Danilova
- Marina Denikina
- Serge Diaghilev
- Michel Fokine
- Gaito Gazdanov
- Zinaida Gippius
- Natalia Goncharova
- Serge Jaroff
- Wassily Kandinsky
- Tamara Karsavina
- Konstantin Korovin
- Yustina Kruzenshtern-Peterets
- Mathilde Kschessinska
- Aleksandr Kuprin
- Dmitry Merezhkovsky
- Dmitri Nabokov
- Véra Nabokov
- Vladimir Nabokov
- Vaslav Nijinsky
- Leonid Pasternak
- Anna Pavlova
- Olga Preobrajenska
- Sergei Rachmaninoff
- Nicholas Roerich
- Vladimir Rosing
- George Sanders
- Zinaida Serebryakova
- Igor Severyanin
- Ivan Shmelyov
- Nicolas de Staël
- Igor Stravinsky
- Vladimir Tretchikoff
- Nikolai Trubetzkoy
- Marina Tsvetaeva
- Danila Vassilieff
- Yevgeny Zamyatin
- Boris Zaytsev

=== Scientists and inventors ===
- Vladimir Ipatieff
- Alexander M. Poniatoff
- Ilya Prigogine
- Alexander Procofieff de Seversky
- Igor Sikorsky
- Otto Struve
- Vladimir Zvorykin
- Vladimir Yourkevitch

=== Other figures ===
- Alexander Alekhine
- Natalia, Princess Brassova
- Igor Cassini
- Peter Carl Fabergé
- Abraham Kaufman
- Michael Kogan
- Hélène Gordon-Lazareff
- Wassily Leontief
- Alexander Obolensky
- Oleg Pantyukhov
- J Pavlikevitch
- Nicholas V. Riasanovsky
- Nicolas Rossolimo
- Boris Skossyreff
- Victor Starffin
- Alexandra Tegleva
- Alexandra Tolstaya
- Vera Tolstoy
- Marie Vassiltchikov
- Vladimir Ussachevsky

== White émigré organizations and entities ==
=== Orthodox Church jurisdictions ===
- Orthodox Church in America (АПЦ, Митрополия) – not entirely founded by White émigrés but includes a significant percentage of émigré parishes.
- Patriarchal Exarchate for Orthodox Parishes of Russian Tradition in Western Europe (Парижский Экзархат)
- Russian Orthodox Church Outside Russia (РПЦЗ, Зарубежная Церковь)

=== (Para)military organizations ===
- Russian All-Military Union (the oldest organization representing the White Government in exile)
  - Inner Line
- Russian Liberation Movement
  - Russian Liberation Army
  - Committee for the Liberation of the Peoples of Russia
  - Russian Corps Combatants (Союз Чинов Русского Корпуса)
- Association of Cadets (Объединение Кадет Российских Корпусов за Рубежом)
- Don Cossack Host
- Kuban Cossack Host
- Terek Cossack Host
- Brotherhood of Russian Truth
- Shanghai Volunteer Corps

=== Political organizations ===
- Russian Imperial Union-Order (the oldest organization representing the monarchist White Russians)
- Constitutional Democratic Party
- Union of October 17
- Socialist Revolutionary Party
- Russian Social Democratic Labour Party (Mensheviks)
- Congress of Russian Americans
- High Monarchist Union (Высший Монархический Совет)
- Mladorossi
- National Alliance of Russian Solidarists (НТС)
- Russian All National Popular State Movement (РОНДД)
- Union for the Struggle for the Liberation of the Peoples of Russia (СБОНР): founded by "second wave" émigrés, but also included many White émigrés.
- Smenovekhovtsy
- All-Russian Fascist Organization
- Russian Fascist Organization
- Russian Fascist Party
  - Russian Women's Fascist Movement

=== Youth organizations ===
- National Organization of Rangers (or "Knights") (НОВ, Витязи)
- National Association of Russian Explorers (НОРР)
- National Organization of Russian Scouts (НОРС)
- Organization of Russian Young Pathfinders (ОРЮР)
- Russian Fascist Party
  - Fascist Union of Youth
  - Union of Young Fascists – Vanguard (boys)
  - Union of Young Fascists – Vanguard (girls)
  - Union of Fascist Little Ones
- Orthodox Organization of Russian Pathfinders (ПОРР)
- Russian Christian Students Movement (РСХД)
- Russian Sokol movement (Русский Сокол)
- VSHSON

=== Charitable organizations ===
- Russian Nobility Association in America
- Society for the Relief of Czarist Exiles
- The Tolstoy Foundation

=== Media ===
- Vozrojdénie

=== Soviet front organizations ===
- Union for repatriation of Russians abroad

== See also ==
- Belarusians in Chicago
- Russian diaspora
- Russian emigration during the Russian invasion of Ukraine
- Russians in Toruń
