= Fascism in Russia =

Fascism in Russia or Russian fascism may refer to:

== Social phenomena ==
- Eurasia Movement
- Far-right politics in Russia
- Managed Nationalism, a term used to refer to the informal collaboration between neo-fascists and the Russian government under Vladimir Putin’s administration.
- National Bolshevism, the merging of ultranationalism and Bolshevism, a part of the ideology of the Eurasia Party.
- Neo-Nazism in Russia
- Putler, a derogatory portmanteau of Putin and Hitler meant to mock the former and draw comparisons between the two figures.
- Red Fascism, the academically controversial notion that Marxism-Leninism is a form of fascism, most commonly applied to Bolshevism and the Soviet Union.
  - Comparison of Nazism and Stalinism
- Ruscism, ideology and social practices of the Russian state in the late 20th and early 21st centuries, portmanteaus of the words 'Russian' and 'fascism'.
  - Putinism
- Russian imperialism
  - Russian irredentism
- Russian ultranationalism
- White Movement, a major right-wing faction during the Russian Civil War which displayed proto-fascist tendencies.
  - Black Hundreds, an ultra-nationalist group within the White movement.

== Works ==
- Russian Fascism: Traditions, Tendencies, Movements

== Organizations ==
- All-Russian Fascist Organisation, active 1933-1934.
- Atomwaffen Division Russland, active 2020-present, a Neo-Nazi group connected to the Russian Imperial Movement.
- Battle Organization of Russian Nationalists, active 2007-2011, a Neo-Nazi group whose members were accused of a series of murders.
- Eurasia Party, active 2002-present, a Eurasianist and National Bolshevist organization.
  - Eurasian Youth Union, the youth wing of the Eurasia party.
- Liberal Democratic Party of Russia, active 1992-present, has been described as fascist.
- Movement Against Illegal Immigration, active 2002-present, a far-right xenophobic organization associated with Russian Neo-nazism.
- Pamyat, active 1980-2021, a far-right monarchist organization that espoused antisemitism, including belief in Judeo-Masonry, Jewish Bolshevism, and the International Jewish conspiracy.
- Russian Fascist Organization, active 1925-1931.
- Russian Fascist Party, active 1931-1943.
  - Russian Women's Fascist Movement, women's wing of the Russian Fascist Party.
- Russian Imperial Movement, active 2002-present, a Christian ultranationalist Neo-Nazi organization.
- Russian National Unity, active 1990-200 a Neo-Nazi and irredentist group.
- Ryno-Skachevsky gang, active 2007-2009, a racist skinhead serial killer group.
- The Cleaners (serial killers), active 2014-2015, a Neo-Nazi serial killer group.
- Wagner Group, Russian mercenary group accused of Neo-Nazism
  - Rusich Group, paramilitary unit with many notable Neo-Nazi elements.
