= List of political parties in Manchukuo =

Manchukuo was a puppet state set up by the Empire of Japan in Manchuria which existed from 1931 to 1945. It was declared with Puyi as the nominal but powerless head of state to add some semblance of legitimacy, as he was a former emperor and an ethnic Manchu. This is a list of political organizations that existed in Manchukuo.

Flag	Party	Ideology	Year Founded	Year Abolished
	Concordia Association	Fascism; Monarchism; Manchurian nationalism; Pan-Asianism Anti-communism; Personalism	1932	1945
	White Russian Fascist Party	Russian clerical fascism; Russian nationalism; Russian irredentism; Authoritarian conservatism; Corporate statism; Class collaboration	1931	1942
	Bureau for Russian Emigrants in Manchuria	Russian Nationalism; Russian Monarchism	1938	1945
	Far Eastern Jewish Council	Jewish interests	1937	1945
	Russian Fascist Organization	Russian clerical fascism; Russian nationalism; Russian irredentism; Authoritarian conservatism	1925	1931
