= Lev Okhotin =

Russian white émigré fascist politician

- Лев Охотин
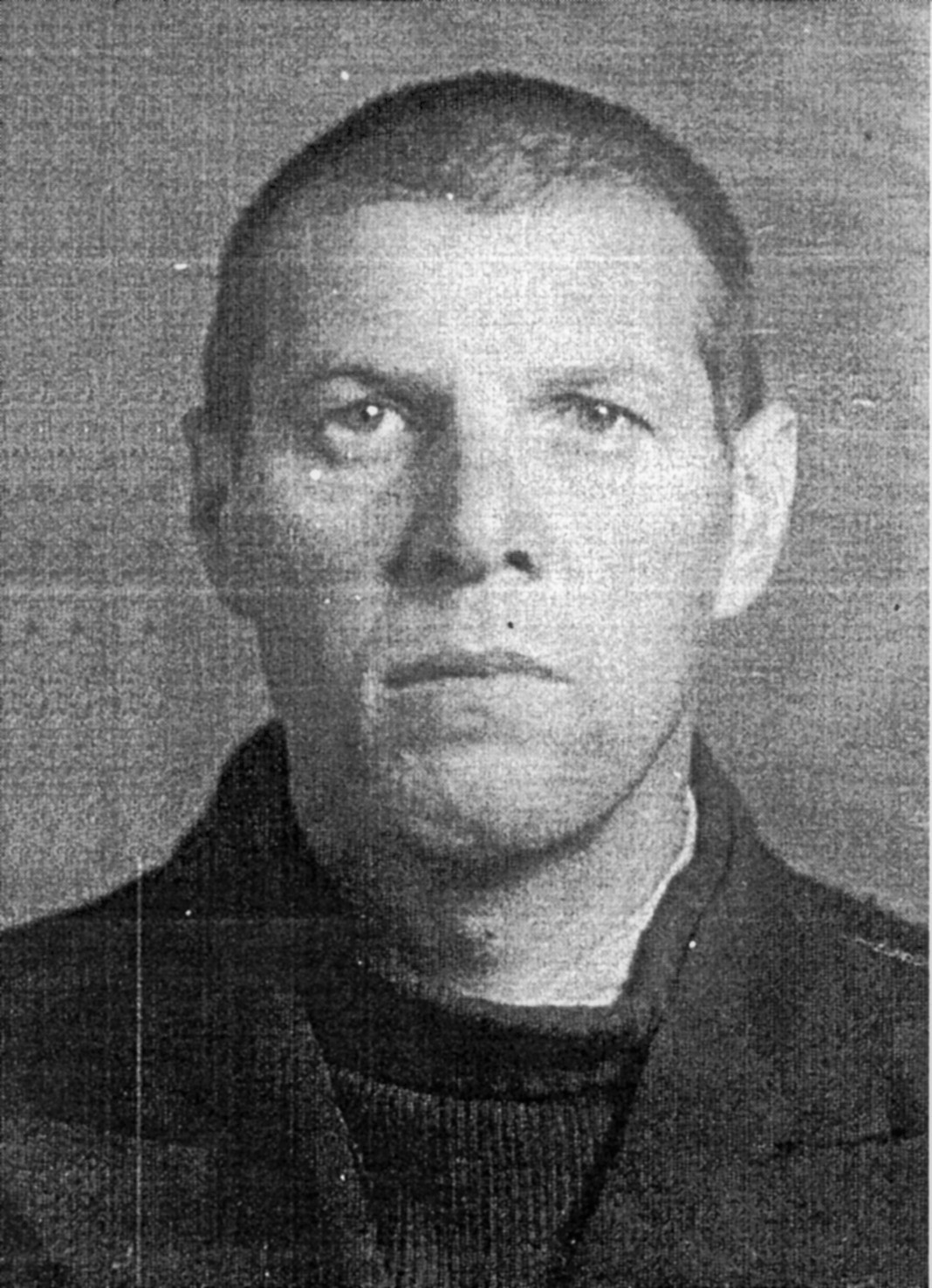
- Okhotin's mugshot
- Born: 9 January 1911; Chita, Russian Empire (now Russian Federation)
- Died: 1948 (aged 36–37); Khabarovsk Krai, Russian SFSR, Soviet Union (now Russian Federation)

Lev Pavlovich Okhotin (Russian: Лев Па́влович Охоти́н; 9 January 1911 – 1948) was a member of the Supreme Council of the Russian Fascist Party, founded by exiles in Manchuria.

== Life and political career ==
Okhotin was born in Chita, into a military family. In 1916 his father, poruchik Pavel Okhotin, died. His mother, Nadezhda, married a section chief of the Chita police, Aleksandr Petrovich Melnikov, in 1919. In August 1920 the family emigrated from the Soviet Union to Manchuria. Okhotin first met Konstantin Rodzaevsky, founder of the Russian Fascist Party, in Harbin in 1932. At the end of 1933, as a student of the Harbin Teacher's Institute, Okhotin joined the Party and remained a member until 1943. Starting in 1935, Okhotin served as the business manager and then office manager of the Russian Fascist Party. In late 1936 he was appointed head of the organizational department of the Party. From 1937 to 1943 was a member of the Supreme Council.

== Arrest and trial ==
Okhotin was arrested by SMERSH, the Soviet counter-intelligence department, on 7 September 1945.

For almost a year, SMERSH agents and the Ministry for State Security conducted an investigation. Defendants in one case were combined as follows: Grigory Semyonov, Konstantin Rodzaevsky, General Lev Vlasyevsky, General Alexey Baksheev, Ivan Adrianovich Mikhailov (Minister of Finance in the Government of Admiral Aleksandr Kolchak), Lev Okhotin, Prince Nikolay Ukhtomsky, and Boris Shepunov. The trial began on 26 August 1946, and was widely reported in the Soviet press. The trial was opened by Vasiliy Ulrikh, the Chairman of the Military Collegium of the Supreme Court of the USSR. The defendants were charged with anti-Soviet agitation and propaganda, espionage against the Soviet Union, sabotage, and terrorism. All the defendants pleaded guilty. On 30 August 1946, the Military Collegium found the defendants guilty, and Okhotin, along with Prince Ukhtomsky, "given their relatively smaller role in the anti-Soviet activities", were sentenced to 15 and 20 year terms in a work camp respectively. Okhotin died in a work camp in 1948.

On 26 March 1998, the Military Collegium of the Supreme Court of the Russian Federation No. 043/46 amended the criminal case against all of the defendants, except Semyonov. According to article 58-10 Part 2 (anti-Soviet agitation and propaganda) of the Criminal Code of the RSFSR, the cases against all defendants were dismissed for lack of evidence. The rest of the sentence was upheld, and the defendants found not subject to rehabilitation.
