= Anastasy Vonsiatsky =

Russian-American white émigré and fascist activist

Anastasy Andreivitch Vonsiatsky
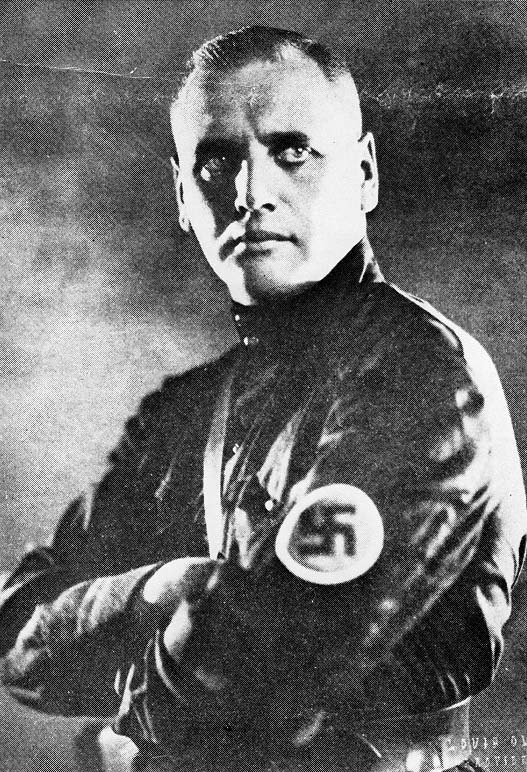

Personal details
- Born: June 12, 1898 Warsaw, Congress Poland, Russian Empire
- Died: February 5, 1965 (aged 66) St. Petersburg, Florida, United States
- Party: All-Russian Fascist Organisation
- Spouses: Lyuba Murmosky (m. 1920; annul. 1922) Marion Buckingham Ream (m. 1922; sep. 1952): Edith Royster
- Children: 2
- Relatives: Andrew Mamedoff (Nephew)

Anastasy Andreyevich Vonsiatsky (Russian: Анаста́сий Андре́евич Вонся́цкий, Polish: Anastazy Wąsiacki; June 12, 1898 – February 5, 1965), better known in the United States as Anastase Andreivitch Vonsiatsky, was a Russian anti-Bolshevik émigré and fascist leader based in the United States from the 1920s. He was the founder of the All-Russian Fascist Organisation.

He became a naturalized American citizen while leading a splinter far-right organization, the Russian National Revolutionary Labor and Workers Peasant Party of Fascists. The headquarters of the RFO were based in Putnam, Connecticut. In 1942, following the United States's entry into war with Germany and Japan, Vonsiatsky was charged with supporting secret contacts with agents of Nazi Germany. He pleaded guilty to espionage and was sentenced to 5 years in prison. Released in 1946, Vonsiatsky lived out the remainder of his life in the United States. He died in St. Petersburg, Florida, in 1965.

== Early life ==
Anastasy Andreyevich Vonsiatsky was born in Warsaw, Poland (then part of the Russian Empire). His family, though Polish in origin, was known for its long devotion to the Russian czars; one of Vonsiatsky's paternal great-grandfather had been handed a comital estate from the Romanovs, which allowed him to use the courtesy title of Count. His father, Andrei Nikolaevich, was an army officer assassinated at a Radom office of the Imperial Gendarmes in 1910 by one of his informants who was a Polish revolutionary. His mother was Nina Anastasievna Plyuschevskaya.

Vonsiatsky was educated at a military prep school in Moscow and the Emperor Nicholas II Cavalry Academy in Saint Petersburg, Russia.

== Military career ==
Vonsiatsky embarked upon a military career in the Imperial Russian Army during the reign of Nicholas II. After the revolutionary events of October 1917, which brought the Leninist Bolsheviks to power and climaxed in the protracted Russian Civil War of 1917–1923, Vonsiatsky, newly admitted to St. Petersburg as a military cadet, took part in the anti-Bolshevik opposition and served in the counter-revolutionary White movement, first seeing action against the Red Army at Rostov. He served in the Volunteer Army under Anton Denikin. In the winter of 1918 and 1919, Vonsiatsky, by his own admission, was allegedly involved in the White Terror in Yalta. The killings were supposedly extrajudicial reprisals against organizers of the Red Terror. Prince Vladimir Andreevich Obolensky later recounted what happened.

"Counterintelligence officers arrested individuals, mainly Jews, whose bullet-ridden bodies were later found somewhere in the ravines in the vicinity of Yalta. Minister of Justice Nabokov organized the investigation, their materials were transferred to the military authorities, but the killers remained free and continued to kill and rape. One of the participants in these bloody affairs, officer Vonsiatsky, having gone into exile and probably needing money, sold his memories about them to the editors of Latest News, where they were published under his signature. I read them then with deep disgust and was indignant that the newspaper was printing them."

In one account, several White officers had pulled out the fingernails and bayonetted the calves of their victim. In another, one of the murderers complained about brain tissue that had spattered on his mackintosh after he had shot a young Jew through the head in front of the victim's horrified parents. However, in The Russian Fascists: Tragedy And Farce In Exile, 1925-1945, John J. Stephan disputed the account.

"Read with a cold eye, Memoirs were outpourings of an overheated imagination. Although he later stated that the material was extracted from his personal diary by a friend who wanted it published, it is unlikely that Vonsiatsky took part in the atrocities that he so floridly evoked. Memoirs was set in the Crimea. Yet Anastasy's two-month sojourn in Yalta (his only visit to the Crimea) was serenely spent as an invalid and then as a son-in-law in a Jewish household. Memoirs might well have been a clumsy didactic tale deploring a tendency among many Whites to equate Jews with Bolsheviks. It probably represented the author’s first flight into make-believe."

Nevertheless, Vonsiatsky's participation in atrocities are undeniable. Later in life, he recalled how he and other White soldiers had machine-gunned 500 Bolshevik prisoners in Rostov on November 27, 1919. Vonsiatsky was wounded several times in the war. He was once shot in the abdomen, and carried this bullet with him for the rest of his life. His brother, Nikolai, was killed in action.

Leaving the White Army's stronghold in the Crimean Peninsula with the departing forces of General Wrangel, Vonsiatsky was evacuated to western Europe in 1920. Traveling through Constantinople and France, Vonsiatsky arrived in the United States in 1922. In March 1930, Vonsiatsky was given an American reserve officer's commission and appointed a first lieutenant of the United States Army Reserve; the military commission would eventually expire in 1935.

== Political activity ==
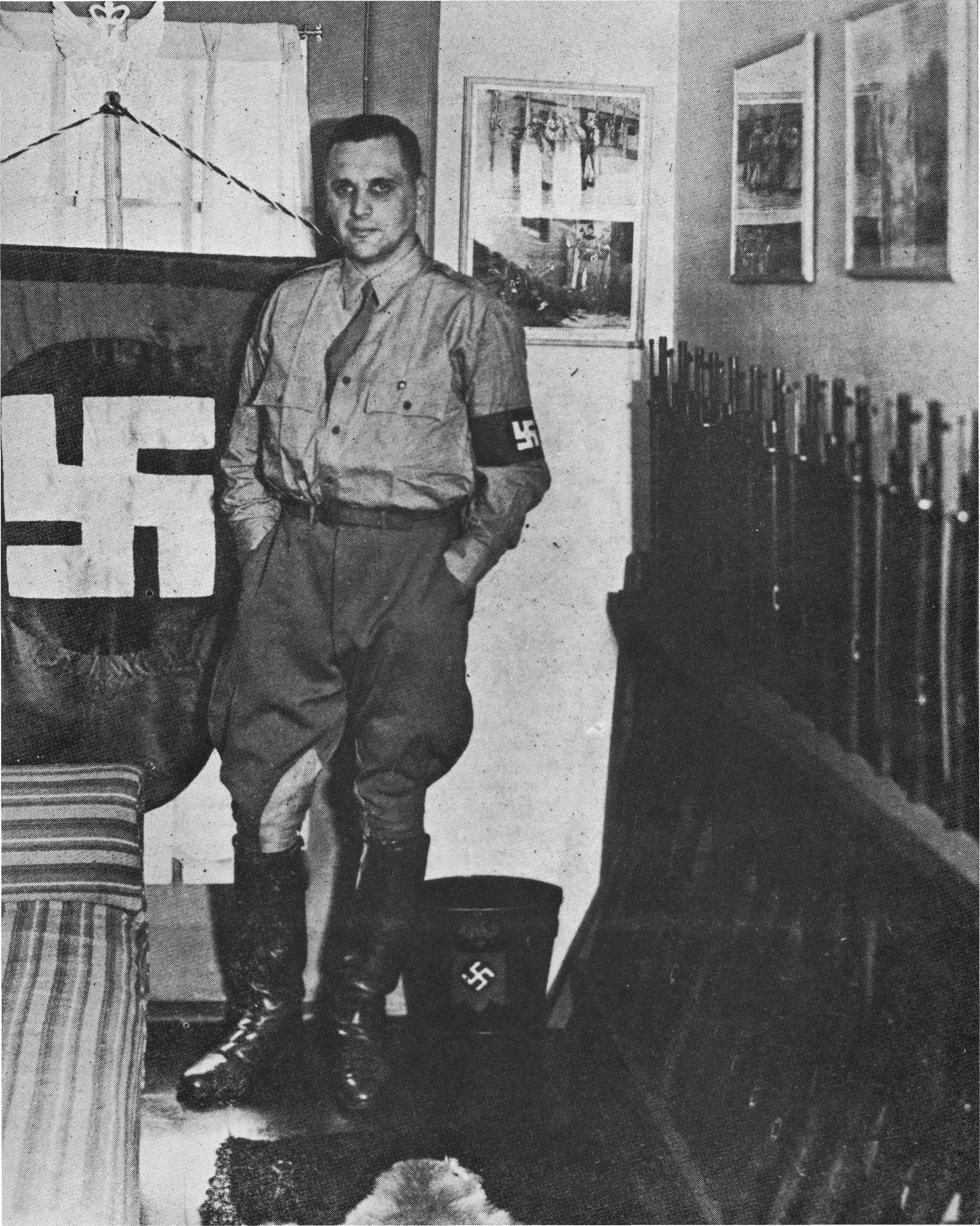
Vonsiatsky in 1935

Forming political connections within the émigré circles after establishing himself outside Russia, Vonsiatsky was, at one point in the interwar period, a leader of the Russian Fascist Organization, an initially independent movement that later became closely associated with the Manchuria-based Russian Fascist Party (RFP). Vonsiatsky split from the RFP in 1933. On March 10, 1933, he founded the Russian National Revolutionary Labor and Workers Peasant Party of Fascists (also referred to as the All Russian National Revolutionary Party, or the All-Russian National Revolution Toilers and Worker Peasants Fascist Party (VRO)), another anti-Soviet and anti-communist organization. The headquarters were established at the Vonsiatsky estate in Connecticut and published a newspaper called Fashist.

Despite earlier publications supplemented by photographs of German soldiers beneath such titles as "The Army of the Holy Swastika" and continuing collaboration with the German American Bund elements during World War II, in public appeals amid the growing anti-German sentiment of the early 1940s, Vonsiatsky's addresses to his target audience struck a different tone. Among other statements, Vonsiatsky wrote:

Fascisms are different. The German, Italian, and Russian Fascisms are different in many respects. The Russian Fascist Party is just a united movement of Russians against Communism, and Fascism is the only political society on the earth at the present time that can wipe out Communism. Force is the only thing that can knock it down.

In 1934, Vonsiatsky's organization merged with the Russian Fascist Party, another fascist political organization led by Konstantin Rodzaevsky and headquartered in Tokyo, Japan. However, they soon parted ways.

In summer 1940, Vonsiatsky's publications declared the following:

The Russian National Revolutionary Party, of which I am the leader, does not support either Germany's or Japan's ambition for hegemony in Europe or the Far East. The Germans and the Japanese have never made clear their attitude toward a replacement of the present Stalinist rule by a Russian National Government. The sole aim of our organization is to return Russia to a free people with a government elected by the people, of the people and for the people. Our intention is to form in Russia a truly DEMOCRATIC government. Our Party is not anti-Semitic. Our Party has no membership dues; it is financed solely by voluntary contributions from its members and sympathizers. It is not subsidized by any FOREIGN POWER or foreign individuals. Our organization is BANNED in Germany and Japan. Only in the United States can we enjoy freedom of action and thought within the laws of the country. I HEREWITH STATE EMPHATICALLY THAT THE ACTIVITIES OF OUR ORGANIZATION ARE AGAINST THE PRESENT SOVIET GOVERNMENT ALONE AND THAT IN NO WAY WHATSOEVER DOES IT ACT AGAINST THE CONSTITUTION OF THE UNITED STATES OR VIOLATE ITS LAWS WHICH WE LOYALLY SUPPORT. ANASTASE A. VONSIATSKY. Thompson, Conn. July 4, 1940

In 1942, Sergei Nikitich Ivanov, a representative of Anastasy Vonsiatsky in Berlin, proposed the creation of the Russian National People's Army (RNNA). In March 1942, Ivanov met with Field Marshal Günther von Kluge, and received permission to form a Russian military unit from Soviet prisoners of war in Barysaw, Smolensk, Roslavl, and Vyazma. The RNNA's leadership told soldiers that their task was, "the fight against Bolshevism and Jewry for the creation of a new Russian state and the restoration of the pre-revolutionary system."

Vonsiatsky became a subject of FBI investigation and was indicted in 1942 for connections with proxies for German interests, including key participants in the pro-Nazi German American Bund, whose leader, Fritz Kuhn, had previously been assisted by Vonsiatsky's bail money in 1939. Among other contacts was the American Hitler admirer William Dudley Pelley. Federal authorities raided the VFO's compound, seizing 57 old Russian rifles, two tear gas guns and 18 cartridges, two automatic handguns, and large quantities of ammunition. Indicted for conspiring to assist Nazi Germany in violation of the Espionage Act alongside fellow conspirators Wilhelm Kunze, Otto Willumeit, Wolfgang Ebell, and Reverend Kurt E. B. Molzahn, Vonsiatsky submitted a guilty plea after first protestations of innocence, and was convicted under the 1917 Espionage Act by a jury in Hartford, Connecticut on June 22, 1942. The lead prosecutor in the case was Thomas J. Dodd, a future U.S. Senator who went on to prosecute Nazi war criminals at the Nuremberg trials following the end of the war.

Vonsiatsky was sentenced to five years in prison and fined $5000. He was imprisoned at the United States Medical Center for Federal Prisoners in Springfield, Missouri. Vonsiatsky was released from prison on February 26, 1946. In April 1946, a federal judge ruled in his favor in response to denaturalization proceedings which had been filed against him in 1942.

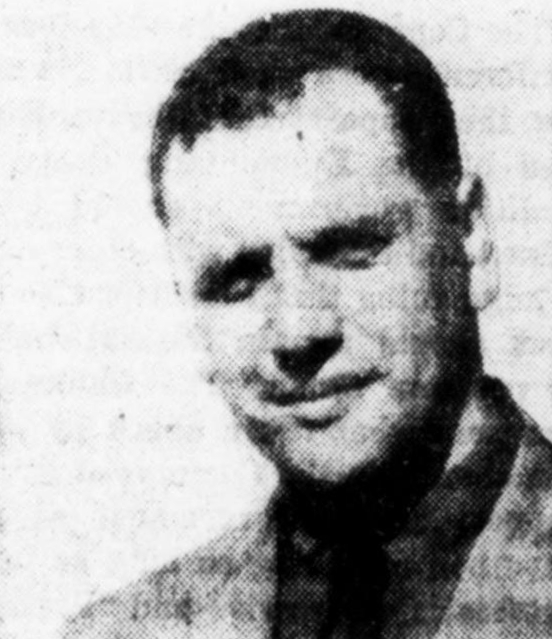
Vonsiatsky c. 1946

After his release from prison, Vonsiatsky moved to St. Petersburg, Florida, where he wrote articles in Russian newspapers and journals. He authored a book entitled Rasplata (Retribution) about World War II, where "he accused the Japanese government, Franklin D. Roosevelt, and his personal nemesis, Thomas J. Dodd, of hampering the anti-Soviet cause". Until his death, Vonsiatsky hated Roosevelt, whom he called a communist, so much that he refused to use the dime, which featured his face. Meanwhile, Vonsiatsky dedicated the Tsar Nicholas II Museum in St Petersburg, Florida.

== Personal life ==
Vonsiatsky was married twice. He first married Lyuba Muromsky, the daughter of a Jewish shopkeeper who had sheltered him during the Civil War, in Ukraine on January 31, 1920.

On February 4, 1922, still married to Lyuba, Vonsiatsky married Marion Buckingham Ream, the daughter of businessman Norman B. Ream, and a multi-millionaire heiress by the time they married. He became a naturalized citizen of the United States in the Superior Court of Windham County, Putnam, Connecticut, on September 30, 1927, after Marion appealed to Secretary of State Charles Evans Hughes. Two months after his second marriage, he was accused of bigamy by his legal wife Lyuba; in November 1922, nine months after Vonsiatsky become a bigamist, the US federal government and the Russian Orthodox Church granted him an annulment of the marriage to Lyuba. The Vonsiatskys resided at Quinnatisset Farm in Putnam, Connecticut.

Vonsiatsky separated from Ream and started a romantic relationship with Edith Priscilla Royster in 1948. In July 1950, Vonsiatsky and Royster had a son together, Andre Anastase Vonsiatsky. In May 1952, the courts granted Vonsiatsky and Ream a legal separation. Ream continued to take care of Vonsiatsky and his son financially, setting up a $12,000 trust for the boy in 1958 (equivalent to $134,000 in 2025), and leaving Vonsiatsky $25,000 when she died in 1963 (equivalent to $263,000 in 2025).

== Death and legacy ==
Vonsiatsky died of coronary thrombosis on February 5, 1965, in St. Petersburg, Florida at Mound Park Hospital, at 66. His body was interred at West Thompson Cemetery in Thompson, Connecticut.

Many of the documents of Vonsiatsky were stored in the archives of the Hoover Institution in California, in the collection of Professor John Stephan, author of The Russian Fascists: Tragedy and Farce in Exile, 1925–1945, and Providence College, Phillips Memorial Library.
