= VFP =

VFP may stand for:

- VFP (instruction set), an extension to the ARM instruction set
- Visual FoxPro, a programming language
- All-Russia Fascist Party (1930s–1942)
- Very Fast Picket, a class of fictional artificially intelligent starship in The Culture universe of late Scottish author Iain Banks
- Veterans Freedom Party, a minor party in the Philippines
- Veterans for Peace, an anti-war organisation in the United States and other countries
