= Union of Young Fascists – Vanguard (boys) =

Youth organization of the Russian Fascist Party

The Union of Young Fascists — Vanguard (Russian: Союз Юных Фашистов — Авангард, Soyuz Yunykh Fashistov — Avangard) was a boy's youth organization of the Russian Fascist Party. It was founded in June 1934 in Harbin, and was made up of Russian nationals ages 10–16.

The objectives of the Union were:

- the preservation of the national identity of Russian children;
- the systematic education of Russian national spirit;
- strict observance of the Russian Orthodox faith and the old traditions of Russia;
- to act as a feeder group for membership of the senior Russian Fascist Party.

The uniform of the Vanguard was a black shirt with yellow buttons and blue epaulettes, a sword belt, and black trousers issued by the Union. Headgear was a black peaked cap with orange piping and a laurelate letter "A" emblem.

== Structure ==
The ideology and tactics of the Union were entirely determined by members of the Russian Fascist Party. Membership was obtained on recommendation of an existing member of the Vanguard, or a member of the senior Russian Fascist Party.

The Union was divided into two groups: Junior (10–13 years) and Senior (13–16 years). Each group was divided into two categories: Second Level (Young Fascist) and First Level (Avangardisty).

Commanding officers in the Union were the Senior Source, the Senior District Commander and Senior Divisional Commander.

The lowest structural unit in the Union was the "Focus", a group of five people. Several of these that were geographically close to each other formed a District, and together with other suburban areas or otherwise related groups, they formed a Department. The head of the group was appointed by the head of the Russian Fascist Party.

At the head of the Union Vanguard was Chief of the Vanguard, appointed by the head of the Russian Fascist Party. The other leaders were appointed on the orders of the Chief of the Vanguard. Leadership consisted exclusively of former members of the White Army. The Union was led by Pavel Ivanovich Prokof'ev until 1935, when he was replaced by Sergei Ivanovich Tsvetkov.

== See also ==
- Union of Fascist Little Ones
- Union of Young Fascists – Vanguard (girls)
- Union of Fascist Youth

== General references ==
- Stephan, John J. The Russian Fascists: Tragedy and Farce in Exile, 1925-1945. ISBN 0-06-014099-2
- К. В. Родзаевский. Завещание Русского фашиста. М., ФЭРИ-В, 2001 ISBN 5-94138-010-0
