= Russian Women's Fascist Movement =

Women's Wing of the Russian Fascist Party

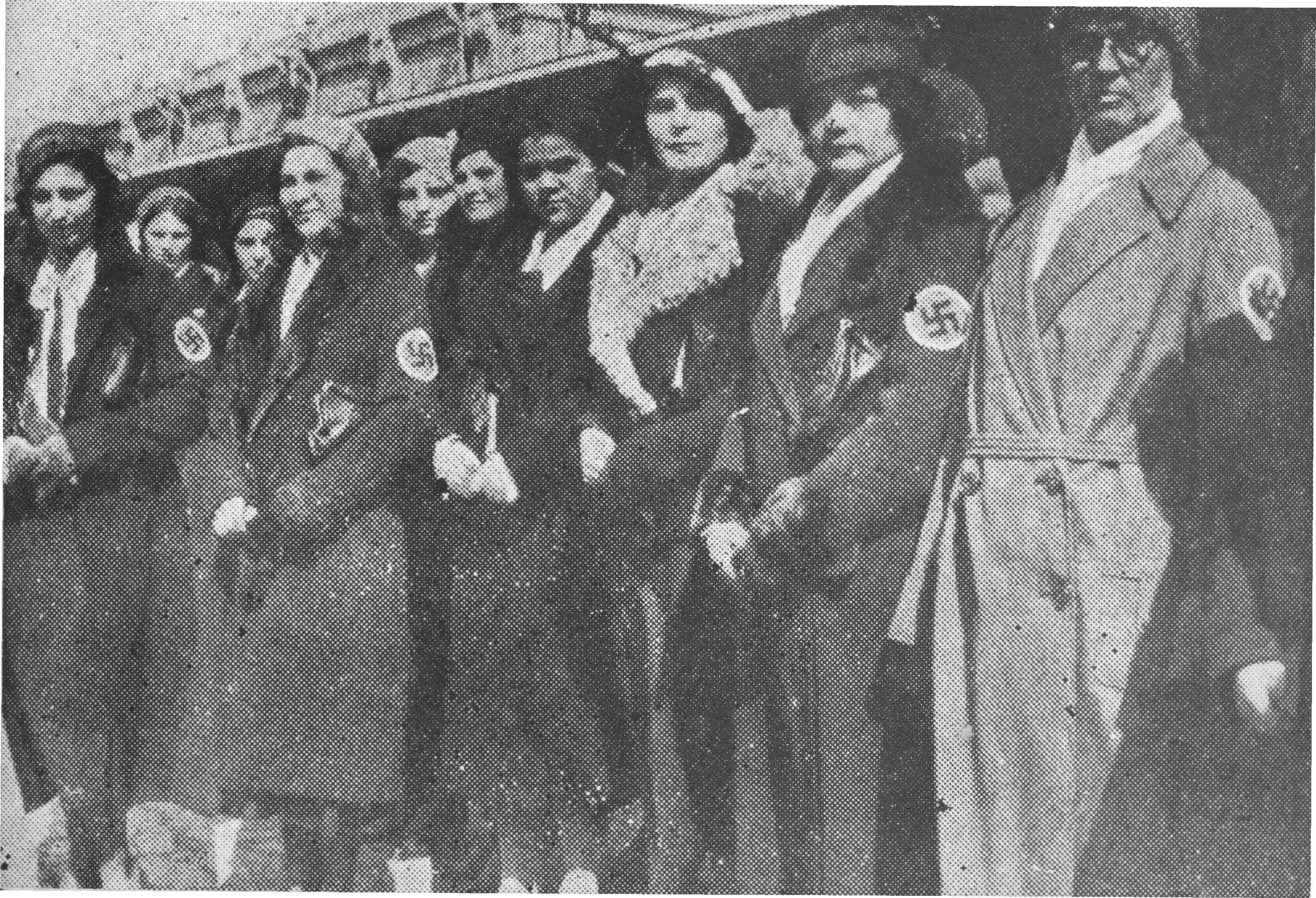
Member RGFD meet at the Harbin railway station Anastasy Vonsyatsky on April 26, 1934.

Russian Women's Fascist Movement (Russian: «Российское женское фашистское движение», Rossiiskoye Zhenskoye Fashistskoye Dvizheniye) was the women's wing of the All-Russian Fascist Party, which existed in Manchuria in the 1930s and 1940s. It was established in Harbin to unite women in Russia who "believe in God and desire a loving home and respectable work". Ideologically, the Russian Women's Fascist Movement (RGFD) adheres to Russian fascism, following the main slogan of Russian fascists "God, Nation, Labor". They supported the Russia of National Labor, which was built on a corporate system of Russian fascism in which a woman would achieve her "rightful place" in the law as the bearer of the idea of beauty and as the keeper of the home.

Russian Women's Fascist Movement served as an autonomous section of the All-Russian Fascist Party (VFP), with its policy provided by the guidance of the RGFD and approved by the Head of the VFP. The Steering Center of the RGFD was established at the VFP congresses. Overall leadership of the movement belonged to the Head of VFP, who led through the RGFD Management Center. Regulations governing the RGFD center went into effect only after the approval of the VFP Head.

The RGFD Steering Center consisted of a chairwoman, who was considered the chairperson of the RGFD as a whole. It also had a deputy, a secretary, who was regarded as the Secretary of RGFD in general, and a treasurer and chiefs of two departments, the propaganda department and the training department.

RGFD local organizations consisted of various groups of fascist sympathizers, candidates, and active members. They were known as hotbeds of the Fascist Party and were made from two to five people covering a certain area.

The center was headed by a main area known as the headmistress district, where the department boss department, appointed by the parent supervisor and approved by the governing center RGFD, was located. Each department head reported to the Chief of the same department name in the VFP.

The uniform of the Russian Women's Fascist Movement was a white blouse, black skirt, black bow-bow and a swastika on the left sleeve.

== Literature ==
- Родзаевский К. В. Завещание русского фашиста. М., ФЭРИ-В, 2001 ISBN 5-94138-010-0
- Stephan, John J. (1978). The Russian Fascists. Tragedy and Farce in Exile, 1925–1945. London: Hamish Hamilton. ISBN 0-241-10033-X.
