= Nash Put' (newspaper) =

Official Russian Fascist Party Newspaper

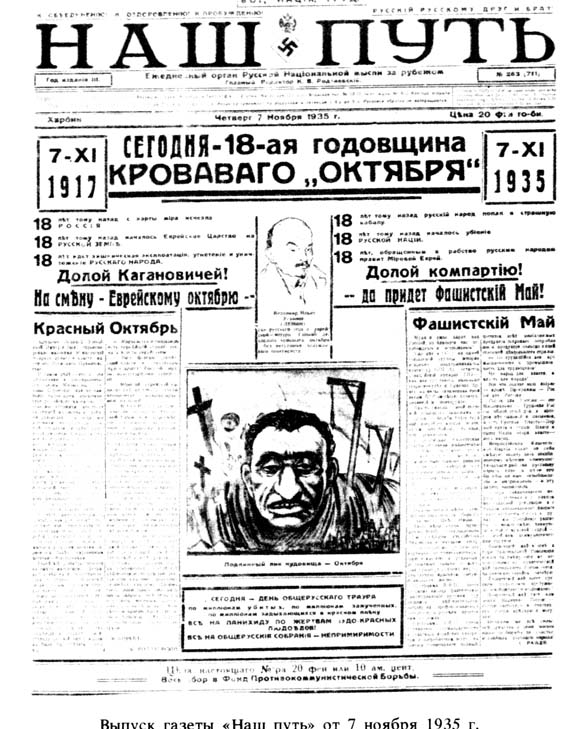
- The November 7, 1935, front page of Nash Put'
- Type: Daily newspaper
- Format: Broadsheet
- Publisher: V.N. Vasilenko, G.A. Khoven
- Editor: Konstantin Rodzaevsky
- Founded: October 3, 1933
- Ceased publication: July 1, 1943
- Political alignment: Fascist
- Language: Russian
- Headquarters: Harbin (Manchukuo), Shanghai (China)
- Circulation: 4,000

Nash Put' (Russian: Наш Путь, Our Way) was a daily newspaper founded by Konstantin Rodzaevsky on 3 October 1933, that was issued in Harbin (1933–41) and Shanghai (1941-1943). The newspaper was the official organ of the Russian Fascist Party. Nash Put' was published until July 1943. The newspaper promoted Christian Orthodoxy, Russian ultranationalism and fascism. The estimated circulation was 4,000. The paper was edited by Konstantin Rodzaevsky from 1933 to 1943. There was also a publishing house, "Izdatel'stvo gazety Nash Put'" (Russian: «Издательство газеты "Наш Путь"», "Publisher of the newspaper Our Way"). In 1936 it published Vladimir Kislitsin's memoirs In the fires of the Civil War: Memoires.

It is the source for an alleged quote from Leon Trotsky whose source claims to be from the memoirs of Aron Simanovitch, Rasputin's secretary.

"The main ally of Lenin, Bronstein-Trotsky did not hesitate at all to talk about plans and goals, We must turn Russia into a desert inhabited by white negros, whom we will give such a tyranny that the most terrible despots of the East never dreamed of. The only difference is that this tyranny will not be on the right, but on the left, and not white, but red. In the literal sense of the word, red, for we will shed such streams of blood, before which all the human losses of capitalist wars will shudder and pale. The largest bankers overseas will work closely with us. If we win the revolution, crush Russia, then on its burial debris we will strengthen the power of Zionism and become such a force before which the whole world will kneel. We will show you what real power is. By terror blood baths, we will bring the Russian intelligentsia to complete dullness, to idiocy, to an animal state ... "

— Purportedly from, Rasputin: The Memoirs of His Secretary by Aron Simanovitch

== Sources ==
- The Russian Fascists: Tragedy and Farce in Exile, 1925-1945 by John J. Stephan ISBN 0-06-014099-2
- К. В. Родзаевский. Завещание Русского фашиста. М., ФЭРИ-В, 2001 ISBN 5-94138-010-0
- Knútr Benoit: Konstantin Rodzaevsky. Dict, 2012, ISBN 978-6-13841624-1
