= Union of Fascist Youth =

Division of the Russian Fascist Party

The Union of Fascist Youth (Russian: Союз Фашистской Молодёжи, Soyuz Fashistskoy Molodyozhi) was a division of the Russian Fascist Party. It was founded in 1936 in Harbin, Manchukuo for men ages 16–30 as a transition between fascist youth organizations and the Russian Fascist Party proper. Members studied at Stolypin Academy, which was established by the party in August 1936 to train the next generation of leaders.

Ideology and tactics of the Union is entirely determined by ideology and tactics of the Russian Fascist Party. Admission to the Union was carried out automatically: all members of the organization VFP appropriate age, regardless of gender. Members of the Union remained part of the VFP.

The Union was divided into two groups, Junior and Senior, each of which had two levels, Second Level (Young Fascist) and First Level (Avangardisty). Members had to pass certain exams to advance to a higher level. Those who successfully passed to the second stage of the Union were enrolled in the Stolypin Fascist Academy.

The Union had cultural, educational, dramatic and philosophical circles, as well as sewing and language schools. The military and political sections were the most important ones in the Union. Structural units of the Union were branches of the Department of the VFP. The head of the Union was appointed by the Head of the VFP and the remaining leaders were appointed by the head of the Union.

== See also ==
- Union of Fascist Little Ones
- Union of Young Fascists – Vanguard (boys)
- Union of Young Fascists – Vanguard (girls)

== Sources ==
- The Russian Fascists: Tragedy and Farce in Exile, 1925-1945 by John J. Stephan ISBN 0-06-014099-2
- К. В. Родзаевский. Завещание Русского фашиста. М., ФЭРИ-В, 2001 ISBN 5-94138-010-0
- А. В. Окороков. Фашизм и русская эмиграция (1920-1945 гг.). — М.: Руссаки, 2002. — 593 с. — ISBN 5-93347-063-5
