= Society for the Relief of Russian Exiles =

The Society for the Relief of Russian Exiles was an international organization established following the Bolshevik Revolution in Russia to support the large number of White émigrés who fled that country during the Russian Civil War.
