= Fashist =

Russian fascist publication

- Cover of Fashist, 1939
- Type: Monthly
- Format: Broadsheet
- Publisher: Anastasy Vonsyatsky
- Editor: Donat Yosifovich Kunle
- Founded: August 1933
- Ceased publication: July 1941
- Political alignment: Fascist
- Language: Russian language
- Headquarters: Putnam, Connecticut, United States
- Circulation: ~10,000

Fashist (Russian: Фашистъ, 'Fascist') was a Russian fascist publication that ran from 1933 to 1941, issued from Putnam, Connecticut, United States. It was published by Anastasy Vonsyatsky. Fashist was distributed among Russian exiles around the world.

== Launching ==
The first issue of Fashist was published in August 1933. The first issue was printed in 2,000 copies. Donat Yosifovich Kunle was the editor of Fashist. The publication functioned as an organ of the All-Russian Fascist Organization.

== Profile ==
Fashist was published more or less on a monthly basis. Each issue was printed in roughly 10,000 copies. The publication had a newspaper format, but was printed on costly glossy paper. The material of the publication consisted of reports on party activities as well as historical narratives. Fashist dedicated a lot of attention to Civil War nostalgia, praising the role of the White Army and its leaders.

== Fashkors ==
Many authors of articles in Fashist were kept anonymous, to avoid reprisals from Soviet agents. Instead, they signed the articles as fashkor (фашкор, short for 'Fascist Correspondent', compare with rabkor) followed by their party membership number and geographic location. By using the pseudonyms of many different fashkors, Fashist created the impression of being in the epicentre of a vast global network of émigré Russian fascist agents as well as a network of saboteurs with the Soviet Union. In reality, Vonsyatsky could count on only a handful of Russian exiles as correspondents.

== Later period ==
As of 1938–39, it served as the organ of the All-Russian National Revolutionary Workers-Peasants Party of Fascists. Fashist ceased publication in July 1941.

== See also ==
- Rashist
- Russian fascism
- Russian imperialism
