= Union of Young Fascists – Vanguard (girls) =

Youth organization of the Russian Fascist Party

The Union of Young Fascists – Vanguard (Russian: Союз Юных Фашисток — Авангард, Soyuz Yunykh Fashistok — Avangard) was the young women's youth organization of the Russian Fascist Party. It was founded in 1934 in Harbin, and was open to Russian girls ages 10–16.

The main objective of the Union was "the preparation of national-minded Russian young women and girls to responsible national service based on religion, nationalism, and work".

The uniform consisted of a white blouse with a black tie and a black skirt.

== Structure ==
The ideology and tactics of the Union were entirely determined by members of the Russian Fascist Party. Membership was obtained on recommendation of an existing member of the Vanguard or a member of the senior Russian Fascist Party.

The Union was divided into two groups, Junior (10–13 years) and Senior (13–16 years). Each group was divided into two categories: Second Level (Young Fascists) and First Level (Avangardistki).

Commanding officers in the Union were the Senior Source, the Senior District Commander, and Senior Divisional Commander.

The lowest structural unit in the Union was the "Focus", a group of five people. Several of these that were geographically close to each other formed a District, and together with other suburban areas or units otherwise related, they formed a department. The head of the group was appointed by the head of the Russian Fascist Party, the others were appointed by their respective commanders.

== See also ==
- Union of Fascist Little Ones
- Union of Young Fascists – Vanguard (boys)
- Union of Fascist Youth
