= Union of Fascist Little Ones =

Youth organization of the Russian Fascist Party

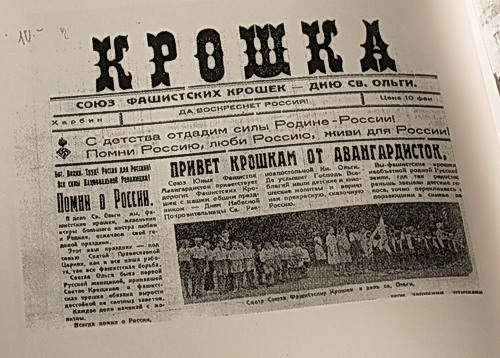
Front page of the Fascist Little Ones newspaper - "Kroshka"

The Union of Fascist Little Ones (Russian: Союз фашистских крошек, Soyuz fashistskikh kroshek) was a youth organization of the Russian Fascist Party. It was founded by Russian immigrants in 1934 in Harbin, China. It was open to "Russian boys and girls who believe in God, love Russia and respect labor".

The Union's declared goal was "saving Russian children from the streets and denationalization impact, raising them for future Russia in the Fascist spirit of religion and nationalism". The Union's members were Russian emigrant children aged between 3 and 10. Their parent's letter affirming agreement was all that was needed to secure membership.

== Structure ==
The membership was organised into levels named (from bottom to top) "Simple", "Clever", "Knowledgeable" and "Advanced". When a boy reached the age of 10 he moved to the Union of Young Fascists – Vanguard (boys), and a girl at that age moved to the Union of Young Fascists – Vanguard (girls).

The Union groups were called Focus groups. Members of each group lived near each other or were students at one school or in one class. Several Focus groups were then members of a District, and several Districts within certain territorial borders made up a Department.

Adult supervisors in the Union were the Focus Master (roughly, company leader), the District Master, and the Department Supervisor.

At the head of the Fascist Little Ones stood the Management Center Union, established by order of the Head of the Russian Fascist Party.

Fascist Little Ones wore uniforms. Boys wore black shirts, a sword belt, and black trousers. Girls wore a black sarafan and white blouses.

== Publications ==
The Union published the newspaper Kroshka.

== See also ==
- Union of Young Fascists – Vanguard (boys)
- Union of Young Fascists – Vanguard (girls)
- Union of Fascist Youth
