= Vladimir Kislitsin =

White Russian general

Vladimir Alexandrovich Kislitsin
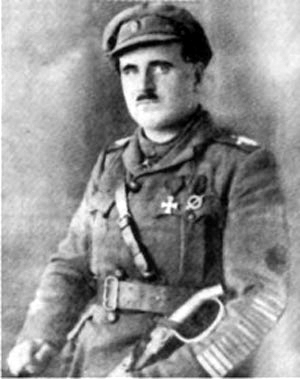
- Vladimir Kislitsin after the Great Siberian Ice march
- Born: January 9, 1883; Bila Tserkva, Russian Empire (now Ukraine)
- Died: May 18, 1944 (aged 60) Harbin, Manchukuo (now Manchuria, China)
- Allegiance: Russian Empire (Russia) White Movement; Manchukuo
- Branch: Imperial Russian Army (Russian Empire) White Army; Manchukuo Imperial Army
- Rank: General
- Commands: 2nd Ufa Cavalry Division
- Conflicts: Russo-Japanese War; World War I Russian Civil War; World War II

Vladimir Alexandrovich Kislitsin (Russian: Влади́мир Алекса́ндрович Кисли́цын) (January 9, 1883 – May 18, 1944) was an officer in the Imperial Russian Army and later commanding officer of the pro-monarchist White Army in the later stages of the Russian Civil War.

== Early life ==
As a son of Admiral Alexander Kislitsin, Vladimir was educated at the Odessa Military Institution in 1900 and the Sandomir Officer Training School. He was assigned to the Special Frontier Corps on the Western border of the Russian Empire and served in the Russo-Japanese War. During the course of World War I he was an officer of the 11th Dragoon Regiment, gaining the rank of colonel in 1916. Kislitsin was awarded the Order of St. George of the Fourth Degree (1915), the Order of Saint Stanislaus (Imperial House of Romanov) of the 3rd and 2nd classes, the St. George honour weapon, and the Order of St. Anna, the 4th and 1st classes. He was repeatedly wounded, many times in the head.

== White movement ==
In 1918, he was appointed commander of the 3rd Cavalry Division of Ufa and then 3rd Cavalry Corps in the army of The Hetmanate. In 1919 Kislitsin served as a company commander in the Northern Army of Evgenii Miller. In July of the same year, Vladimir Kislitsin was appointed commander of the 2nd Brigade of the Ufa Cavalry Division under Admiral Aleksandr Kolchak. In December 1919 he was appointed commander of the 2nd Ufa Cavalry Division.

After the defeat of Admiral Kolchak's armies in the Ural and Western Siberia, Kislitsin took part in the Great Siberian Ice march. After his arrival at Chita, Ataman Grigory Semyonov entrusted to Kislitsin's command the 1st Ataman Semyonov Manchurian Detachment until the end of the White movement in Transbaikal (1921-1922).

== White emigre ==
Vladimir Kislitsin emigrated to Harbin in November 1922, where he became a dentist, but also served in the police. In Manchuria he was a head of local "legitimists" (legitimisti, in Russian легитимисты), who supported Grand Duke Cyril Vladimirovich as a legal heir to the Russian throne. In 1928, he was promoted to full general by Grand Duke Cyril Vladimirovich. In 1936, Kislitsin's memoirs ('In the fires of the Civil War: Memoires') were published in Harbin (then a part of Manchukuo) by Nash Put publishing house. From 1938 to 1942, Kislitsin acted as a chairman of Bureau for Russian Emigrants in Manchuria (BREM), established by Japanese occupational forces.

He died in Harbin in 1944, where he was buried as well.

== See also ==
- White movement
- Russian Civil War
