= All-Russian Fascist Organization =

Russian fascist party in Connecticut

- Leader: Anastasy Vonsiatsky
- Founded: May 10, 1933; 93 years ago
- Dissolved: 1942
- Succeeded by: Russian Fascist Party
- Headquarters: Putnam, Connecticut
- Newspaper: Fashist
- Membership: Several hundred
- Ideology: Fascism
- Political position: Far-right

The All-Russian Fascist Organization (VFO) (Russian: Всероссийская фашистская организация, romanized: Vserossiyskaya Fashistskaya Organizatsiya) was a Russian white émigré group led by Anastasy Vonsiatsky. It was based in Putnam, Connecticut, United States and was founded on May 10, 1933, by Vonsiatsky and Donat Yosifovich Kunle, a former White Russian Army officer. The group never had more than several hundred members.

In 1934, in Yokohama, the Russian Fascist Party (RFP) and VFO attempted to merge into a new entity, the All-Russia Fascist Party. On April 3, 1934, representatives from both organizations signed a protocol number 1, which proclaimed the merger of RFP and VFO and the creation of the All-Russia Fascist Party (VFP). The new organization was intended to connect the RFP's organizational structure with the financial resources of the VFO. April 26, 1934, in Harbin on 2-m (Unity) Congress of Russian Fascists happened formal association VFO and the RFP and the creation of the All-Russia Fascist Party.

A full merger was quite problematic however, because Vonsiatsky was an opponent of anti-Semitism and considered the support base of the RFP—primarily Russian Cossacks and the monarchists—as an anachronism. In October–December 1934 there was a split between Konstantin Rodzaevsky and Anastasy Vonsiatsky. The Vonsiatsky group remained in the RFP, but later he refounded his party as the All-Russian National Revolutionary Party. The party remained a marginal feature. It was renamed several times, eventually assuming the name All-Russian National Revolutionary Toilers and Workers-Peasants Party of Fascists (Russian: Всероссийская национально-революционная трудовая и рабоче-крестьянская партия фашистов).

In 1940 – December 1941, the cooperation of Rodzaevsky and Vonsiatsky resumed, interrupted with the start of Japanese-American War.

After the U.S. entry into World War II in 1942 Anastasy Vonsiatsky was arrested by the FBI for espionage, after which the party ceased to exist. Federal authorities raided the VFO's compound, seizing 57 old Russian rifles, two tear gas guns and 18 cartridges, two automatic handguns, and large quantities of ammunition.
