= Konstantin Rodzaevsky =

Russian fascist and politician

- Константин Родзаевский
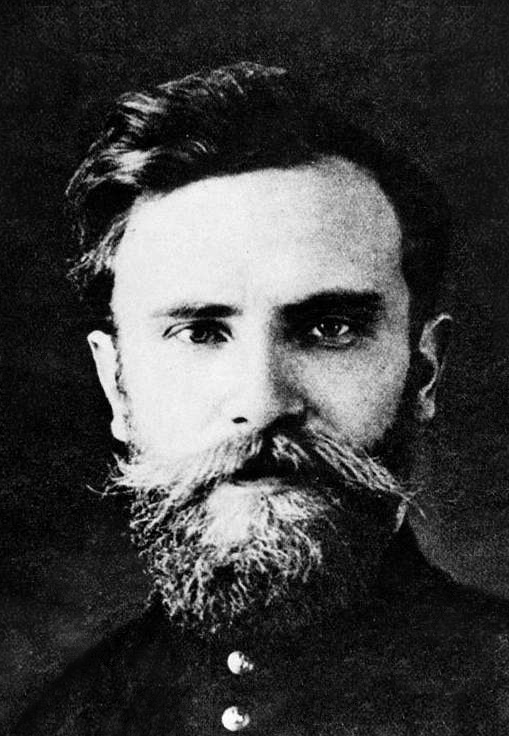
- Rodzaevsky in 1934

Secretary General of the Russian Fascist Party
- In office 26 May 1931 – 1 July 1943
- Preceded by: Office established
- Succeeded by: Office abolished

Personal details
- Born: 11 August 1907 Blagoveshchensk, Russian Empire
- Died: 30 August 1946 (aged 39) Moscow, Russian SFSR, Soviet Union
- Cause of death: Execution by shooting
- Party: Russian Fascist Party
- Profession: Lawyer

Konstantin Vladimirovich Rodzaevsky (Russian: Константин Владимирович Родзаевский; 11 August [O.S. 29 July] 1907 – 30 August 1946) was the leader of the Russian Fascist Party, which he led in exile from Manchuria. Rodzaevsky was also the chief editor of the RFP paper Nash Put' (Russian: Наш Путь, Our Way). After the defeat of anti-communist forces in the Russian Civil War, he fled to Manchuria in 1925 and eventually became the leading figure of the Russian Fascist movement. He was lured by the NKVD to return to the Soviet Union with false promises of immunity and executed in a Lubyanka prison cellar after a trial for "anti-Soviet and counter-revolutionary activities".

== Early life ==
Konstantin Vladimirovich Rodzaevsky was born in a small town near the city of Blagoveshchensk, the administrative city of Amur Oblast on the 11th of August 1907. Konstantin's family was decidedly middle class and was a part of a quite rare and frail status of Siberian bourgeoise. Vladimir Ivanovich, his father, was a gentleman who worked as a notary with a degree in law. His mother, Nadezhda Mikhailovna was from an old Blagoveshchensk family and devoted herself to raising Konstantin alongside his younger brother, Vladimir, and his two sisters, Nadezhda and Nina. Most notably, Konstantin had at some point became a member of the Komsomol during his adolescence.

== Far Eastern Fascism ==
Unexpected to his family, Rodzaevsky fled the Soviet Union for Manchuria in 1925. In Harbin, Rodzaevsky entered the law academy and joined the Russian Fascist Organization. On May 26, 1931, he became the Secretary General of the newly created Russian Fascist Party; in 1934 the Party amalgamated with the All-Russian Fascist Organization of Anastasy Vonsyatsky, Rodzaevsky becoming its leader. He modeled himself on Benito Mussolini, and also used the Swastika as one of the symbols of the movement.

Rodzaevsky collected around himself personally selected bodyguards, using the symbolism of the former Russian Empire and Russian nationalist symbols; like the Italian Blackshirts, the Russian Fascists wore black uniforms with black crossed belts. Rodzaevsky's black shirts were armed with weapons obtained from the Imperial Japanese Army. They created an international organization of White émigrés with a central office in Harbin, the "Far East Moscow", and made connections in twenty-six nations around the world. The most important of these international posts were in New York City.

== Manchukuo ==
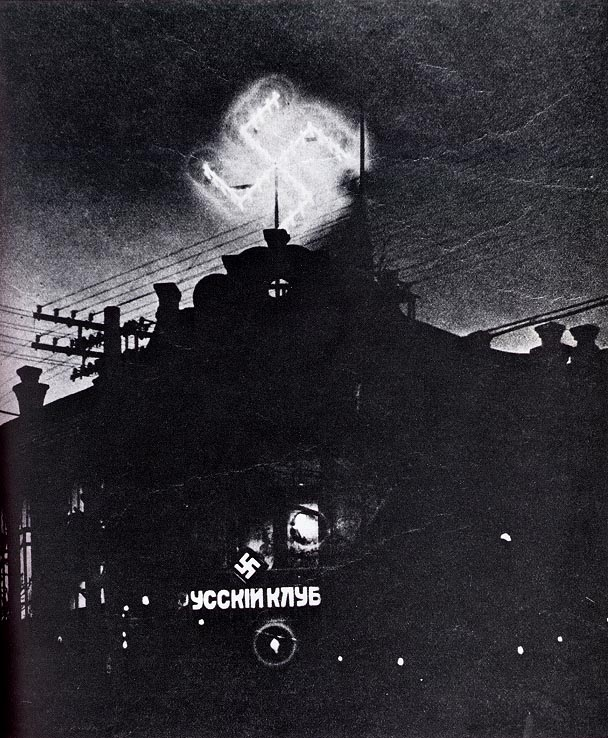
Russian Club in Manzhouli.

Rodzaevsky had around 12,000 followers in Manchukuo. During the 2,600th anniversary of the founding of the Empire of Japan, Rodzaevsky, with a select group of people, paid his respects to Emperor Hirohito at the official celebration in the region.

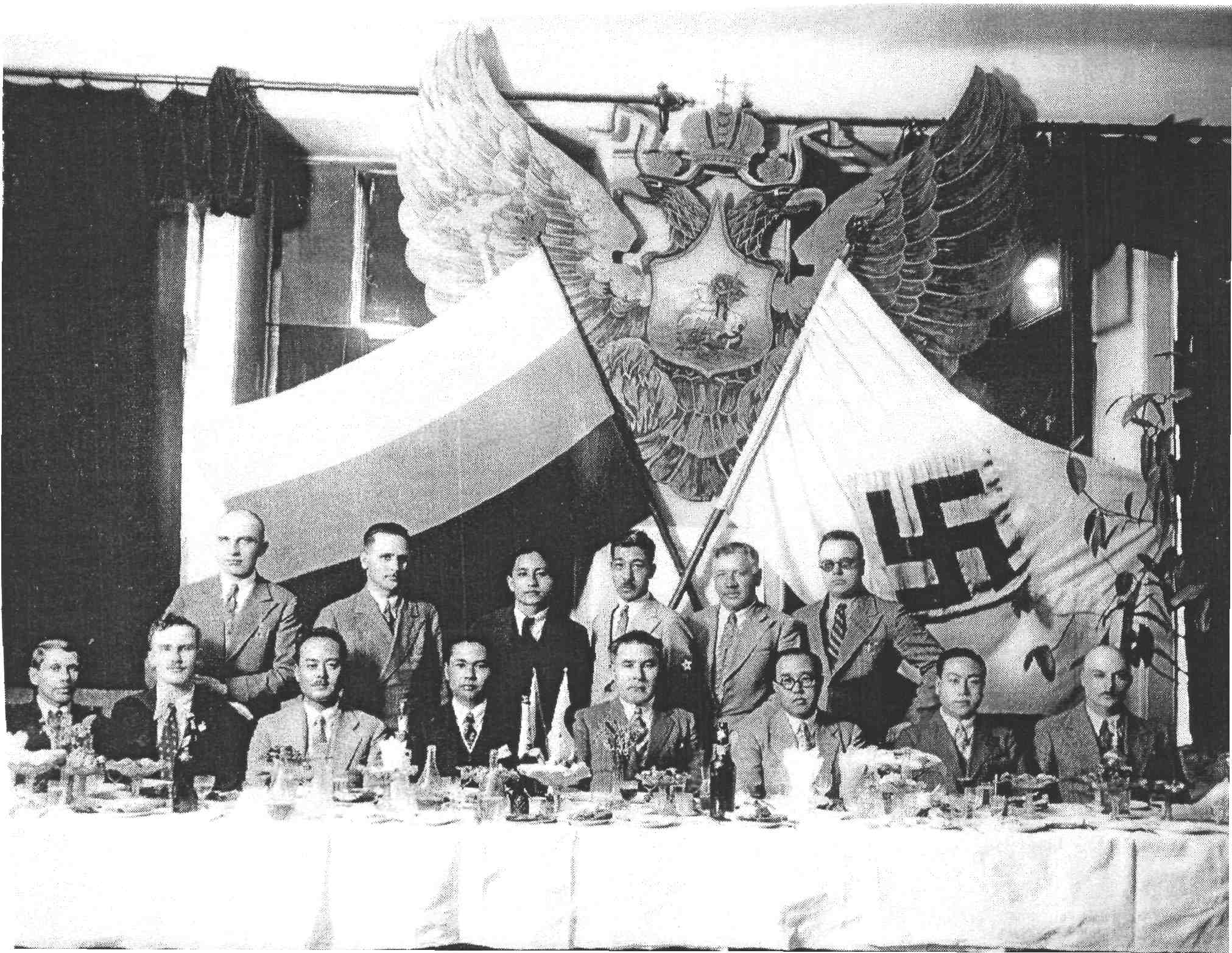
Rodzaevsky (seated second from left), L. F. Vlasyevsky (seated fourth from right), and to the right of him, Akiko Toshi. Banquet in Harbin on the occasion of the establishment of the Bureau for Russian Emigrants in the Manchu Empire. December 1934.

The fascists installed a great swastika illuminated by neon light at their branch in Manzhouli (Manchouli), at least 3 km from the Soviet border. It was kept on all day and night to provide a show of power against the Soviet government. Rodzaevsky awaited the day when, leaving these signs on the Russian border, he would lead the White Anti-Soviet forces, joining White General Kislitsin and Japanese forces, into battle to "liberate the people of Russia from Soviet rule". Their main military acts involved the training of the Asano Detachment, an entirely ethnic-Russian special force in the Kwantung Army, organized for carrying out sabotage against Soviet forces in case of any Japanese invasion of Siberia. Japan was apparently interested in creating a White Russian regime in Outer Manchuria.

== World War II and execution ==
During World War II, Rodzaevsky tried to launch an open struggle against Bolshevism, but Japanese authorities limited the RFP's activities to acts of sabotage in the Soviet Union. A notorious anti-Semite, Rodzaevsky published numerous articles in the party newspapers Our way and The Nation; he was also the author of the brochure "Judas’ End" and the book "Contemporary Judaisation of the World or the Jewish Question in the 20th Century".

Upon the Soviet invasion of Manchuria and the impending occupation, Rodzaevsky fled Harbin and moved to Shanghai, leaving his family behind. At the end of the war, Rodzaevsky had what he called a "spiritual crisis". He claimed that Joseph Stalin's regime was evolving into a nationalist one. Rodzaevsky said he now understood that Stalinism was the ideal embodiment and realization of "our Russian fascism." In a long personal letter, he explained himself, made excuses, and admitted his mistakes. He admitted to participating in anti-Soviet activities, but said these were "acts against the motherland out of love for the motherland." He said he was wrong to support Germany, but that he'd believed Hitler could help Russia by exterminating the Jews. The letter also showed striking similarities with the doctrines of National Bolshevism, with Rodzaevsky saying he was now a "national Communist and convinced Stalinist":

I issued a call for an unknown leader, ... capable of overturning the Jewish government and creating a new Russia. I failed to see that, by the will of fate, of his own genius, and of millions of toilers, Comrade J.V. Stalin, the leader of the peoples, had become this unknown leader.

Rodzaevsky personally begged Stalin for forgiveness, referring to himself as "your unworthy slave". In response, the Soviets offered him an amnesty and a job as a journalist in one of their newspapers. Rodzaevsky returned, only to be arrested upon arrival (along with fellow party-member Lev Okhotin). The trial, which began on August 26, 1946, was widely covered in the Soviet press. It was opened by the chairman of the Military Collegium of the Supreme Court of the Soviet Union, Vasily Ulrikh. Rodzaevsky and other leaders of the RFP were charged with anti-Soviet agitation, creation of the Russian Fascist Party and distributing anti-Soviet propaganda among White army exiles and creation of similar anti-Soviet organizations in China, Europe and the United States. In addition, according to the verdict, he was involved in preparing an attack on the Soviet Union, together with a number of Japanese generals, as well as personally organizing spies and terrorist groups against the Soviet Union with the cooperation of German and Japanese intelligence. All of the defendants pleaded guilty.

Rodzaevsky was sentenced to death. Also sentenced to various punishments were Grigory Semyonov, Lev Fillipovich Vasilevsky, Aleksei Proklovich Baksheev, Lev Okhotin, Ukhtomsky and others. Rodzaevsky was executed in a Lubyanka prison cellar on 30 August 1946.

== The Last Will of a Russian Fascist ==
The Last Will of a Russian Fascist
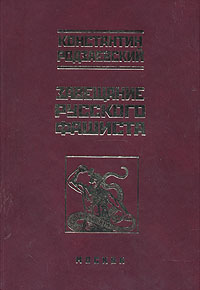
- Author: Konstantin Rodzaevsky
- Original title: Завещание русского фашиста
- Language: Russian
- Genre: Journalism
- Publisher: FERI-V
- Publication date: 2001
- Publication place: Russia
- Pages: 512
- ISBN: 5-94138-010-0
- OCLC: 49660451

The Last Will of a Russian Fascist (Russian: Завещание русского фашиста, romanized: Zaveshchaniye russkogo fashista) is a 2001 reprint edition of a book by Rodzaevsky. Circulation of the book was 12,000 copies, of which 5,000 were a first-edition volume with illustrations, and the remainder were a second-edition volume without illustrations.

=== Content ===
The book begins with a preface by I. Dyakov, "At the Edge of Russian Graves", and a biography of Konstantin Rodzaevsky written by K. Gusev.

The bulk of the book is the monograph by Rodzaevsky "Contemporary Judaisation of the World or the Jewish Question in the 20th Century", published in Harbin in 1943. The monograph is divided into four parts:

1. "Traveling around the world" discusses political geography and the views of the author regarding the geography of the world in terms of the presence of Jews and the degree of their influence in a country
2. "Excursion to the story": the author's conception of Jewish history
3. "World Jewish interstate": the author's conception of the organization of Jewish communities of the world
4. "The decision of our destiny": the author's opinions about contemporary world events, their causes, and the hidden consequences of the Jewish Policy

Also included in the book is "Azbuka fashizma" ("The ABC of fascism"), compiled, edited and with additions by Rodzaevsky published in Harbin in 1934. This work represents 100 responses to 100 questions about fascism. At the end of the book, the anthem of the Russian Fascist Party (VFP) is found.

In the book published by VFP Program (approved 03/07/1935 in Harbin) and approved by the Supreme Council of 25.10.1936, is included the VFP position papers: "On the party greeting" No. 69, "On the party flag of VFP" No. 71, "On the National Flag and National Anthem" No. 73, "On the party icon" No. 67, "On the party banner" No. 72, "On the party and form a hierarchical Signs" No. 68 (with appendix – table of hierarchical letters), and "On the religious icon" No. 65.

After the party documents in the book, there are two articles by Aleksey Shiropaev: "Voice of Russian Truth" and "Russian of the future".

The book includes a statement dated October 4, 1997, concerning the rehabilitation of Rodzaevsky, Lev Okhotin, and others; the definition of the Military Collegium of the Supreme Court of the Russian Federation No. 043/46 dated 26.03.1998; the refusal of rehabilitation of Rodzaevsky, Lev Okhotin, and others; as well as the response from the Chief Military Prosecutor's Office on the legality of this definition.

=== Banned in Russia ===
On October 11, 2010, due to a decision by the Central District Court of Krasnoyarsk, the book became recognized in Russia as extremist material, and the book has been included in the Federal List of Extremist Materials (No. 861).

== Notes ==
- The Russian Fascists: Tragedy and Farce in Exile, 1925-1945 by John J. Stephan ISBN 0-06-014099-2
- К. В. Родзаевский. Завещание Русского фашиста. М., ФЭРИ-В, 2001 ISBN 5-94138-010-0
- А.В. Окороков. Фашизм и русская эмиграция (1920-1945 гг.). М., Руссаки, 2002 ISBN 5-93347-063-5
- Knútr Benoit: Konstantin Rodzaevsky. Dict, 2012, ISBN 978-6-13841624-1
