= Russian Fascist Party =

All-Russian Fascist Party Всероссийская фашистская партия
- Secretary-general: Konstantin Rodzaevsky
- Founder: Nikolai Nikiforov
- Founded: 26 May 1931; 95 years ago
- Dissolved: 1 July 1943; 83 years ago
- Preceded by: Russian Fascist Organization
- Headquarters: Harbin, Manchukuo
- Newspaper: Nash Put'
- Women's wing: Russian Women's Fascist Movement
- Youth wing: Fascist Union of Youth
- Membership: approx. 30,000 (1938 est.)
- Ideology: Christian fascism; Russian irredentism; Ultra-nationalism; Corporate statism
- Political position: Far-right
- Religion: Russian Orthodoxy
- Political alliance: All-Russian Fascist Party (Note: Union with the All-Russian Fascist Organization which lasted from 24 March 1934 to 1935.)
- Colours: Black Gold White
- Slogan: Бог, Нация, Труд ("God, Nation, Labour")
- Anthem: "Rise, brothers, with us!"

Party flag
- Other flag

The All-Russian Fascist Party (Russian: Всероссийская фашистская партия, romanized: Vserossiyskaya fashistskaya partiya Russian: ВФП, romanized: VFP) and from 1937 onwards the Russian Fascist Union (Russian: Российский фашистский союз, romanized: Rossiyskiy fashistskiy soyuz) was a minor Russian émigré movement that was based in Manchukuo during the 1930s and 1940s.

== History ==
Fascism had existed amongst the Manchurian Russians; the minor Russian Fascist Organization (founded in 1925), amongst others, had promoted its tenets. The defeat of the White Armies in the Russian Civil War of 1917–1922, which discredited the older White leaders, together with the rise of Fascism in Italy (in power from 1922) caused many younger Russian émigrés to look to fascism as an alternative that might beat communism. The fascist movement among the White émigrés existed around the world, but the majority of its supporters lived in Manchuria and in the United States. A number of Russians had settled in Manchuria when the Russian Empire had occupied the region from 1900 to 1905, and numbers increased from an influx fleeing after the Red Army victory in the Russian Civil War.

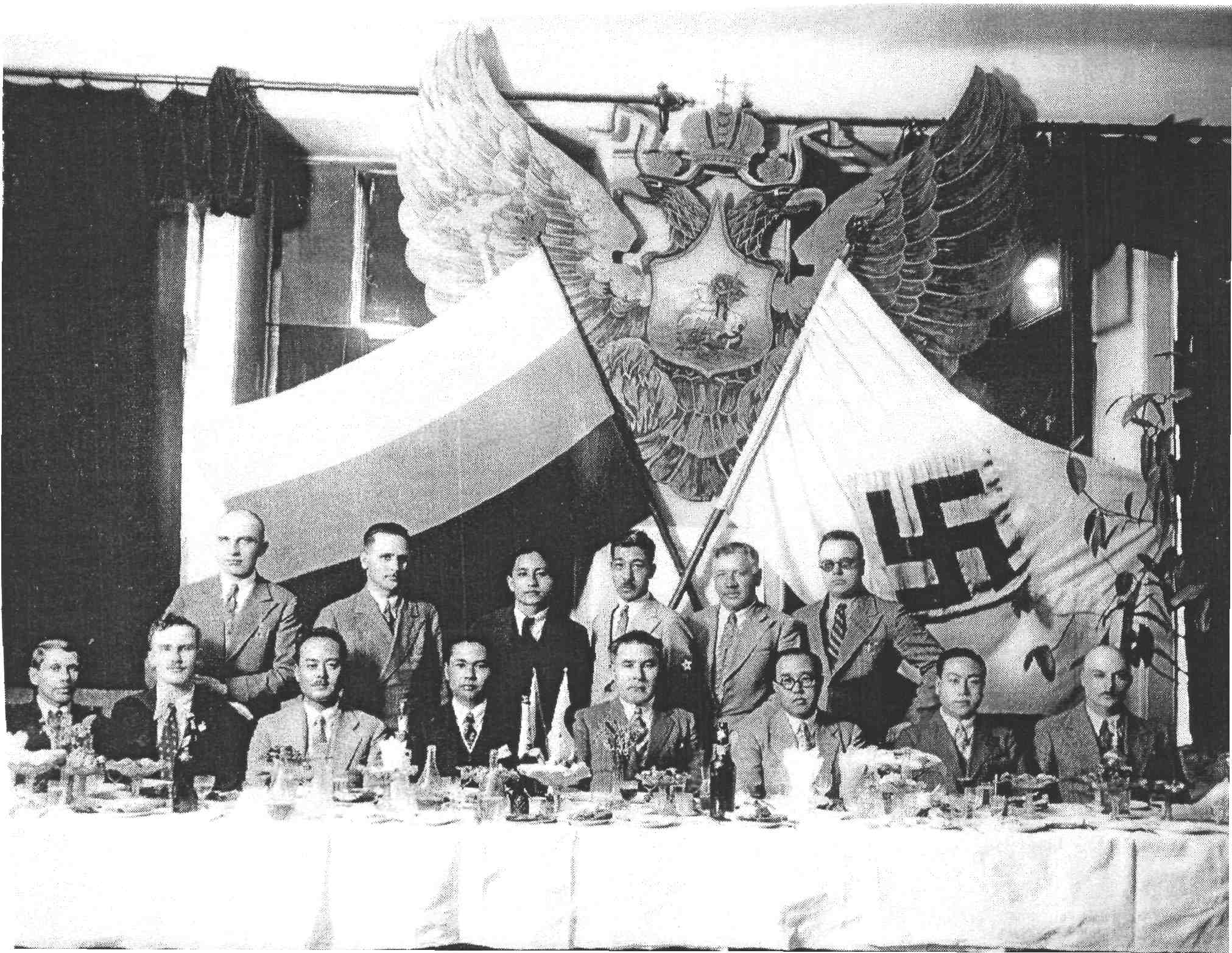
Banquet in Harbin on the occasion of the establishment of Bureau Russian Emigrants in Manchuria, December 1934

A secret convention of the various groups took place, leading to the foundation of the RFP under the presidency of Major General Vladimir Dmitrievich Kozmin. Konstantin Rodzaevsky became Secretary General of the party's central committee on May 26, 1931, becoming the de facto leader of the party. Adopting the slogan "God, Nation, Labour" and publishing the journal Natsiya ("Nation"), the party called for Italian-style fascism to take advantage of the shaky position of the Bolshevik leaders in the face of both external and internal opposition. During the Japanese invasion of Manchuria in 1931-32 the Russian Fascist Party came out very strongly in the support of Japan, forging close links with the Kwantung Army that lasted until 1945.

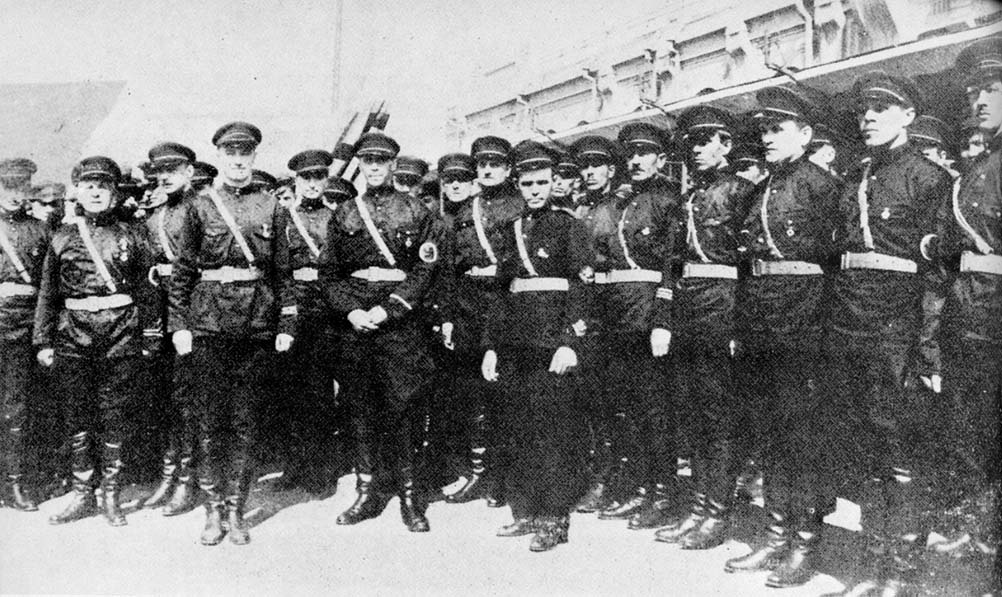
RFP (Russian Fascist Party) Blackshirts at Harbin Station, 1934, waiting for arrival of their leader Konstantin Rodzaevsky

By cooperating with Japan, the RFP became the most influential émigré group in Manchukuo, setting up a party school in Harbin in 1932. Rodzaevsky also assisted the Imperial Japanese Army in the formation of the Asano Detachment, the all ethnic-Russian special forces in the Kwantung Army, organized for carrying out sabotage against Soviet forces in case of any Japanese invasion of Siberia and the Russian Far East areas.

The party also developed close links with like-minded groups in the United States, including Anastasy Vonsyatsky during his exile. On 24 March 1934, the RFP and Vonsyatsky's supporters (who also used the label All-Russian Fascist Organisation) agreed to a merger in Tokyo, albeit they would later clash over Rodzaevsky's attempts to accommodate more conservative Russians, as well as his anti-Semitism, which Vonsyatsky rejected. In a pamphlet published in Connecticut in 1932 titled On Russian Jews, Vonsyatsky had written: "Among the Jews, only the red Jew is our enemy. Do not touch the peaceful Jewish inhabitant, his wife or his children. We are Christians. We do not shed innocent blood, we do not lament the guilty." By contrast, Rodzaevsky's followers had been translating various völkisch tracts from German into Russian since 1932, and he had openly admired Nazi Germany (established in 1933) right from the beginning.

Much to Rodzaevsky's discomfort, the Kwantung Army forced Rodzaevsky to concede that in the event of a war with the Soviet Union, all of the Russian émigrés in Manchuria would come under the command of Ataman Grigory Semyonov. This caused tensions with Vonsyatsky, who argued that Semyonov was an incompetent general who had been defeated in the Russian Civil War, and an unsavory character to boot, being well known in Manchuria for his involvement with organized crime. In an open letter published on 31 December 1934, Vonsyatsky condemned Rodzaevsky for his "deviations" by agreeing to work with Semyonov. Rodzaevsky justified his willingness to work with the Kwantung Army under the grounds: "Japan is the only country not interested in the dismemberment of Russia, but the creation of a great and powerful Russia, which would be Japan's friend". Vonsyatsky argued that the "liberation of Russia" could only be accomplished by the Russians themselves, and opposed working with foreign powers. Eventually the RFP broke with the Americans, and in 1935 Vonsyatsky was expelled, breaking off to form a more minor movement in the United States called the "Russian National Revolutionary Party", which was of anti-communist orientation and claimed that their only intention was "to form in Russia a truly democratic government".

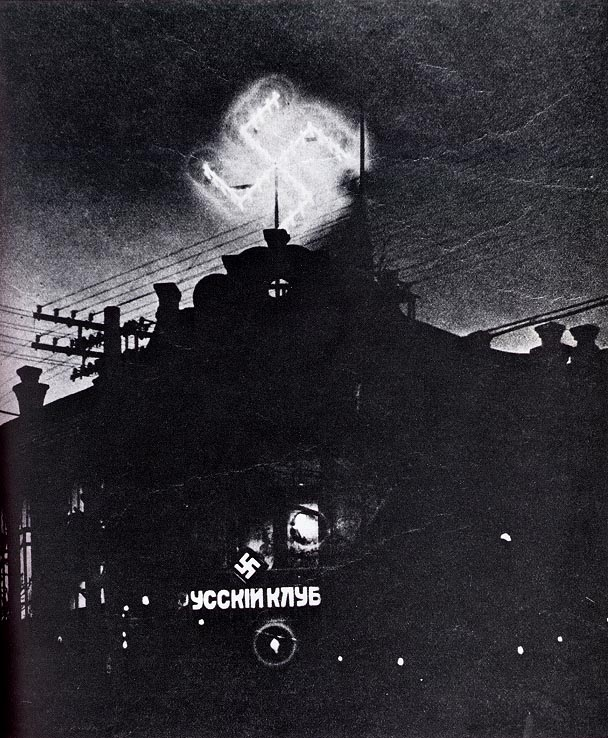
Illuminated swastika at RFP Manzhouli headquarters, 1934

Nevertheless, the RFP under Rodzaevsky had grown strong, and he claimed in a speech on 22 May 1935 to have 20,000 activists organized in 597 local chapters across the world, with the majority being in Manchukuo. Subsidiaries of the RFP were set up - the Russian Women's Fascist Movement (RGFD), the Fascist Union of Youth, the Union of Young Fascists – Vanguard (boys), the Union of Young Fascists – Vanguard (girls), and the Union of Fascist Little Ones. Rodzaevsky's book, The Russian National State, outlined the programme of the party to establish fascism in Russia by 1 May 1938, including a desire to get rid of the Jews, indicating a strong break from the Vonsyatsky-wing. The party had a strong commitment to the Russian Orthodox Church, promising a special relationship between the Church and the state in Rodzaevsky's projected fascist Russia. The group also promised to respect the traditions of Russia's nationalities and to instigate corporatism. In a series of articles published in the spring of 1935, Rodzaevsky gave as his aims the "liquidation of Jewish rule in Russia", the re-establishment of the Eastern Orthodox Church as the state religion of Russia, rejection of the "tendency towards cosmopolitanism", and "Russia for the Russians".

Rodzaevsky called for "class co-operation" instead of "class conflict", which was to be achieved via an Italian style "corporate state", which would mediate between the interests of labor and capital by imposing "national unions". Rodzaevksky stated that once the Soviet régime was overthrown, he would create a "temporary dictatorship" that would establish a "federated state", and he never explicitly claimed that he was to serve as a leader, but his rhetoric left little doubt that he saw himself as the future vozhd of a fascist Russia. Rodzaevsky's definition of Russian nationalism did not define Russianness in ethnic terms so much as in terms of a "common historical destiny", which meant that provided that they were loyal the Russian state (with the exception of the Jews who Rodzaevsky saw as born disloyal), all of the non-Russian ethnic groups were to be considered "Russian".

Though Rodzaevsky excoriated Imperial Russia in many ways, his definition of Russian nationalism as those loyal to the Russian state owed much to definition of Russianness in the Imperial period, where those who were loyal to the House of Romanov were considered Russian, regardless of their language. Under his leadership, Rodzaevsky envisioned Russia taking back Poland, Estonia, Latvia, Lithuania, and Finland, and in addition, he planned to annex Romania, Bulgaria, Iran, Afghanistan, and Mongolia.

Finally, to definitively resolve the problem of "domination by the Jews and Freemasons", Rodzaevsky called for an alliance of Fascist Russia, Nazi Germany and Imperial Japan. A problem with this future foreign policy was the open anti-Slavic racism expressed by the Nazis, who saw all Slavs as Untermenschen (sub-humans) and the Soviet Union as a place that was to be Germany's Lebensraum ("living space") that millions of Germans would colonize after a conquest of the Soviet Union. One of the völkisch tracts not translated into Russian by the Russian Fascist Party was Mein Kampf, as Hitler's denigration of Slavs as Untermenschen and his statements that Germany's Lebensraum was to be found in the Soviet Union presented problems for the Russian Fascists. Rodzaevsky wrote to Hitler, asking him to amend Mein Kampf, and upon receiving no reply, finally did translate Mein Kampf into Russian in 1936 with the offending passages removed. In his speeches to his followers, Rodzaevsky praised Hitler as a "great statesman" and tried to explain away Hitler's anti-Russian statements and his intentions to colonize Russia, as expressed in Mein Kampf, as something written a long time ago that was not relevant at present, saying that he knew that Hitler had changed his views about Russia. Several of the RFP leaders called for the restoration of the monarchy, but Rodzaevsky himself remained vague on this issue until 1940, only saying that a Russia under his leadership would not be a republic and refusing to commit himself explicitly to a Romanov restoration.

In November 1935 the psychological war laboratory of the German Reich Ministry of Defence submitted a study about how best to undermine Red Army morale should a German-Soviet war break out. The Wehrmacht had dispatched a team to Manchukuo to contact the leaders of the Russian Fascist Party, and working together, the German-Russian team put together a series of pamphlets written in Russian for distribution in the Soviet Union by Germany. The pamphlets written in Manchukuo were designed to play on Russian anti-Semitism, with one pamphlet calling the "Gentlemen commissars and party functionaries" a group of "mostly filthy Jews", and ending with the call for "brother soldiers" of the Red Army to rise up and kill all of the "Jewish commissars". Although this material was not used at the time, later in 1941 the material the psychological war laboratory had developed in 1935 in Manchukuo was dusted off, and served as the basis not only for German propaganda in the Soviet Union but also for propaganda within the Wehrmacht for Operation Barbarossa (1941).

The Russian Fascist Party maintained very close links with Japanese military intelligence, and in January 1934, Rodzaevsky visited Tokyo to ask the Army Minister General Sadao Araki for Japanese support for his proposed raising of an army of 150,000 men from the ethnic Russian population of Manchukuo that would be led by him to invade the Soviet Union. Nothing came of this plan, if only because the Russian Fascist Party did not command the loyalty of 150,000 whom Rodzavesky claimed would flock to his banner. From 1936 onward, members of the party infiltrated into the Soviet Far East from Manchukuo to engage in sabotage and to hand out pamphlets calling for the overthrow of the Soviet régime. This was extremely dangerous work, and most of the volunteers who infiltrated the Soviet Union were captured; in July 1938, a "spy school" was established to provide training for the volunteers, but the capture rate remained high, right up to April 1941 when the Soviet-Japanese non-aggression pact put an end to these operations.

The Kwantung Army operated a secret biological-chemical warfare unit, Unit 731, based in Pingfang, that performed gruesome experiments on people that usually involved evisceration of the subjects in order to see the effects of chemicals and germs on the human body, and were always fatal for the subject. In the late 1930s, the doctors of Unit 731 demanded more Caucasian subjects to experiment upon in order to test the efficiency of the strains of anthrax and plague that they were developing on Caucasians, having already mastered strains capable of killing Asians by much experimentation on Chinese subjects. As a result of this, great many of the Russians living in Manchukuo found themselves the unwilling human guinea-pigs of Unit 731. The Kwantung Army used the Russian Fascists to kidnap various "unreliable" Russians living in Manchukuo for Unit 731 to experiment upon.

From 1940 to December 1941 Konstantin Rodzaevsky and Anastasy Vonsyatsky resumed cooperation, but the start of the Japanese-American War interrupted this.

When war was declared by the United States against the Empire of Japan, the activities of the RFP outside Manchuria slowly came to an end. The Japanese restricted the group following the Soviet–Japanese Neutrality Pact (signed 13 April 1941). In October 1941 the Japanese uncovered the Soviet spy-ring headed by Richard Sorge in Tokyo, which caused the Japanese to have an exaggerated and paranoid fear that Soviet spies were everywhere. The Kenpeitai began to suspect in early 1943 that Rodzaevsky was in fact a Soviet agent, and in May 1943, he was arrested and taken in for questioning by the Kenpeitai, before being released in June 1943. In July 1943, following complaints from the Soviet ambassador to the Japanese about the anti-Soviet statements coming from the Russian émigrés in Manchukuo, the Japanese shut down Nash Put. By mid-1943, following the Soviet victories at Stalingrad and Kursk, the Japanese no longer took it for granted that Germany would defeat the Soviet Union, while they themselves had suffered a number of defeats at the hands of the Americans, which made Tokyo anxious to avoid a war with the Soviet Union. From the viewpoint of Tokyo, the Russian Fascist Party by the middle of 1943 had become a liability that was straining relations with Moscow - this caused the Japanese to shut down the RFP's media outlets. The group came to an end following the Red Army invasion of Manchukuo in the Soviet invasion of Manchuria of August 1945. Rodzaevsky surrendered in Harbin (1945) and was executed in Moscow (30 August 1946).

== See also ==
- All-Russian Fascist Organization
