= Russian Fascist Organization =

Fascist organizations in Manchuria by Russian émigrés

Russian Fascist Organization (RFO) was the name adopted by a Russian émigré group active in Manchuria before World War II.

The RFO was formed in 1925 by members of the law faculty at Harbin Normal University. Under the leadership of Nikolai Nikiforov, it looked to Italian fascism for inspiration and produced the 'Theses of Russian Fascism' in 1927. The RFO smuggled some propaganda into the Soviet Union, although this was brought to the attention of China who banned the group from publishing such works. In 1931 the RFO absorbed into the newly founded Russian Fascist Party (RFP) under the leadership of Konstantin Rodzaevsky.
