= Innokenty Smolin =

Russian military commander

Innokenty Semyonovich Smolin
- Born: Innokenty Konstantinovich Mutterperl; January 13, 1884; Yakutsk, Russian Empire
- Died: March 23, 1973 (aged 89); Papeete, French Polynesia
- Military career
- Allegiance: Russian Empire; Russian Republic; Siberian Republic; Russian State; Eastern Okraina; Provisional Priamurye Government
- Branch: Infantry
- Service years: 1905–1917 (Russian Empire – Russian Republic); 1918 (Siberian Republic); 1918–1922 (Russian State – Eastern Okraina – Provisional Priamurye Government)
- Rank: Major general (1919); Lieutenant general (1920)
- Commands: 3rd Finnish Rifle Regiment; 3rd Steppe Regiment (until June 1918); 15th Kurgan Siberian Rifle Regiment (July 1918 – May 1919); 4th Siberian Rifle Division (December 21, 1918 – March 20, 1920); 3rd Steppe Siberian Army Corps (May 1919 – October 12, 1919); 2nd Omsk Rifle Division (April – August 1920); 2nd Siberian Rifle Corps (August 23, 1920 – August 1922); Siberian Rat (August – November 1922)
- Conflicts: World War I Russian Civil War
- Awards: Order of Saint George; Order of Saint Vladimir; Order of Saint Anna; Order of Saint Stanislaus; Order of the Great Siberian Ice March; Military Cross, 1914–1918; Golden Weapon for Bravery

Innokenty Semyonovich Smolin (Russian: Иннокентий Семёнович Смолин; January 13, 1884, in Yakutsk – March 23, 1973, in Papeete) was a Russian military commander who served in the Russian–Japanese War, World War I and Russian Civil War. A prominent figure in the White movement in Siberia and the Far East, in 1919 Smolin achieved the rank of Major general in the Russian Army and in 1920 Lieutenant general in the Far Eastern Army, although eventually he renounced the latter position.

== Biography ==
Innokenty Semyonovich Mutterperl (Russian: Иннокентий Семёнович Муттерперль), sometimes also called Innokenty Konstantinovich Mutterper (Russian: Иннокентий Константинович Муттерпер), was born on January 13, 1884, into a bourgeois family in the city of Yakutsk. He was of Karaim descent.

=== Officer ===
In 1905, he graduated from the Irkutsk Military School in the 2nd Category. On May 5, 1905, he was promoted from the Portupey Junker to Second Lieutenant in the 11th Siberian Infantry Regiment of Semipalatinsk. He participated in the Russo–Japanese War, but saw no action. On May 7, 1906, the regiment was transferred from the city of Semipalatinsk to the city of Kurgan. On December 3, 1909, by virtue of long service Smolin was appointed Lieutenant (seniority from May 5, 1909). On September 14, 1910, the 11th Infantry Siberian Reserve Semipalatinsk Regiment and the 12th Infantry Siberian Reserve Barnaul Regiment were combined into the 44th Siberian Rifle Regiment. On January 7, 1914, by virtue of long service Smolin was appointed Staff Captain (seniority from May 5, 1913).

On June 3, 1914, he was transferred as сommander of the 6th Company to the 4th Finnish Rifle Regiment (22nd Army Corps), participating in the First World War as part of the regiment.

On September 7, 1914, the captain of the 4th Finnish Rifle Regiment, Innokenty Mutterperl, was wounded and shell–shocked near the town of Byala and sent to the Minsk Hospital.

From February 10, 1915, Captain Mutterperl participated in the battle of Kozevo, controlling an important section of the positions, repeatedly drove out the Germans who broke into Russian trenches and retained the section entrusted to him, being awarded the Golden Weapon for Bravery. He was shell–shocked on February 14, 1915 and on April 24, 1915.

From April 19, 1915, Smolin commanded the 2nd Battalion of the 4th Finnish Rifle Regiment. On April 29, 1915, he was made regimental adjutant. On September 22, 1915, for distinction in deeds Smolin was appointed Captain (seniority from February 9, 1915). On March 22, 1916, Smolin was appointed Lieutenant Colonel (seniority from August 1, 1915). Since December 1916, he handled economic affairs of the regiment. In March 1917, he served as a temporary commander of the regiment. From April 1917 Smolin was assistant commander, then commander of the 3rd Finnish Rifle Regiment (22nd Army Corps). On August 19–29, 1917, he was sent to the Stavka of the Supreme Commander for a meeting as a representative from the command staff of the 7th Army. He was discharged from the army on November 20, 1917.

=== Commander of the White Partisan Detachment ===
He settled with relatives near the city of Turinsk. In early 1918, he headed an underground officer organization in Turinsk. Then, pursued by the Bolsheviks, he hid in the vicinity of the city. In June 1918, he crossed the front line, went to the location of the White troops and reached Kurgan, and then Omsk, where he suggested that Colonel Pavel Ivanov–Rinov create a special detachment to carry out operational tasks to eliminate Soviet power in Siberia.

On June 24, 1918, a Smolin's detachment was formed (35 Czechs and 44 Russians, of which 16 were horsemen under the command of Captain Mikhail Manzhetny). The composition of the Russians was as follows: 25 officers, 4 volunteers, 6 soldiers from local peasants and 9 students from Kurgan youth. The detachment was part of the 2nd Steppe Siberian Rifle Regiment (commander Captain Dmitry Pankov). On June 25, 1918, Smolin's detachment set out from Kurgan and on the evening of June 26, 1918, occupied the village of Isetskoye without a fight. Then, on the night of June 30, 1918, he captured the Yertarsky Glass Factory, where he arrested the council of deputies, and on the night of July 1, 1918, the Tugulym Station (the Yekaterinburg–Tyumen Railway Line), where he summoned and captured an armored train of the Reds. Then the detachment moved to the Tyumen–Omsk Railway Line, where it joined the 1st Steppe Siberian Rifle Division (commander Colonel Grigory Verzhbitsky) of the 2nd Steppe Siberian Corps (commander Colonel Pavel Ivanov–Rinov) of the Siberian Army. Smolin's detachment was reinforced by the 3rd Steppe Siberian Rifle Regiment (up to 190 infantrymen, commander Captain Boris Verzhbolovich), two platoons of the 2nd Siberian Cossack Regiment (60 cavalrymen) and one gun. On July 16, 1918, the detachment, after a heavy battle, took the Podyom Station. From July 18, 1918, Smolin held the rank of Colonel. On the night of July 19 he attacked the village of Chervishevo (the Consolidated Cavalry Hundred of Captain Manzhetny, consisting of 70 men, was supposed to cross the highway north of Chervishevo, interrupting its connection with the city of Tyumen and the village of Bogandinskoye, and attack from the north; 3rd Steppe Siberian Rifle Regiment was supposed to attack from the southeast, Smolin's detachment – from the west). Smolin's detachment played an important role in the capture of the city of Tyumen on July 20, 1918 by the troops of General Grigory Verzhbitsky. After the capture of the city, Colonel Smolin commanded a parade of troops of White rebels, Cossacks and Czechoslovaks.

White officer Boris Filimonov recalled the circumstances of the creation of Smolin's detachment as part of the corps of General Pavel Ivanov–Rinov:

When a certain Lieutenant Colonel Smolin, who had arrived from nowhere, appeared at the corps headquarters and offered his services in forming a partisan detachment, it never occurred to anyone at the headquarters to check whether he really was the person he claims to be. They realized this only two weeks later, when a partisan detachment was already led by Lieutenant Colonel Smolin. The corps headquarters then became terribly worried and sounded the alarm. The fact is that someone, either jokingly or seriously, stated at the headquarters of the corps that Smolin was in fact in the service of the Bolsheviks and was provoking Ivanov–Rinov. And then telegrams and secret instructions flew from Omsk to Kurgan and counterintelligence agents went to immediately and accurately find out the location of Smolin's detachment and detain him. But then reports came to corps headquarters about the successful actions of the detachment of Lieutenant Colonel Smolin in the deep rear of the Reds, which brought calm and joy to the White command, and for some people, presumably, a decent embarrassment.

=== General of the White Army ===
Smolin's detachment was renamed the 3rd Steppe Regiment, and then became part of the 15th Kurgan Siberian Rifle Regiment. On July 31, 1918, Smolin took command of the 15th Kurgan Siberian Rifle Regiment from Lieutenant Colonel Cherkasov and in May 1919 transferred the regiment to Lieutenant Colonel Boris Verzhbolovich. The regiment was part of the 4th Siberian Rifle Division (commander Colonel Mikhail Fukin, then Major General Grigory Verzhbitsky).

On September 28, 1918, at the head of the 15th Kurgan Siberian Rifle Regiment, he was the first to enter Alapaevsk. He organized an investigation to clarify the circumstances of the execution of members of the Romanov Dynasty on the night of July 18, 1918. He kept the documents of the investigation at his headquarters and later transferred them to the head of the 7th Ural Division, General Vladimir Golitsyn who then sent them to the commission investigating the circumstances of the murder of the Tsar's family and its relatives in the Urals.

On January 3, 1919, the Russian Army was created by the Supreme Ruler of Russia, Admiral Alexander Kolchak. From December 21, 1918, to March 20, 1920, Smolin commanded the 4th Siberian Rifle Division, which was part of the 3rd Steppe Siberian Army Corps (commander Major general Grigory Verzhbitsky, then Smolin himself).

From May 1919 to October 12, 1919, Smolin was the Commander of the 3rd Steppe Siberian Army Corps as part of the Southern Group of Forces under Lieutenant general Grigory Verzhbitsky. On March 16, 1919, Smolin was promoted to a Major general.

On October 12, 1919, the 3rd Steppe Siberian Army Corps was reorganized into the Southern Group of the 2nd Army (army commander Major General Sergey Voytsekhovsky). In November 1919, the Southern Group together with the Tobolsk Group was combined into a single column under the command of Lieutenant general Grigory Verzhbitsky.

From January 27 to February 22, 1920, Smolin commanded of the Southern Group of Forces. After participating in the Great Siberian Ice March, he commanded a group of troops of the 4th Siberian Rifle Division, which, numbering more than 1,800 fighters, came to Chita on March 4, 1920.

From April to August 1920 Smolin commanded the 2nd Omsk Rifle Brigade in the troops of the Eastern Okraina of Ataman Grigory Semyonov. In April 1920, Smolin was awarded the rank of Lieutenant general by Semyonov, but later renounced it. From August 23, 1920, he commanded the 2nd Siberian Corps of the Far Eastern Army. After the defeat of the White Far Eastern Army on November 20, 1920, in Transbaikalia, he moved to Primorye by Chinese Eastern Railway through Manchuria and China with the remnants of the 2nd Rifle Corps. After arriving, he took command of the former 2nd Rifle Corps in the White Rebel Army (Amur Provisional Government of Merkulov).

In 1921, he headed the garrison of Nikolsk–Ussuriysky.

Since August 1922, he commanded the Siberian Rat (formerly part of the 2nd Corps, consisting of 1450 infantrymen and cavalrymen) of the Zemskaya Rat.

=== Life in exile ===
From 1922, he lived in exile. As of 1925, he resided in Qingdao and owned a grocery store, then served as a watchman at a factory and a jockey at a hippodrome. Since 1932, he lived in Shanghai. He served in the International Savings Society, worked as a house manager, and, according to some sources, as a jockey.

In 1939, he left for the United States of America, where his son Boris Smolin was born. Then he moved to the island of Tahiti, where he was employed as chief accountant in the bank of the city of Papeete. During this time Smolin was a member of the Society of Veterans of the First World War. In his last years, he wrote memoirs.

The Soviet geographer Gleb Udintsev recalled a meeting with Smolin in 1961 in Tahiti and his question whether he still misses his homeland. In response, Smolin said:

Of course, I miss it, but too many difficult memories are associated with the death of the Admiral and our entire army, so it would be better not to awaken them by returning to the land that has become evil for us. However, I confess that I would like to visit my wife's grave for at least a minute. She was a nurse who died of typhus and was buried in Nikolsk–Ussuriysky, now Voroshilov–Ussuriysky. But seems like I won't be able to.

Smolin died on February 23, 1973, in the town of Papeete in the Papeete Commune of the Windward Islands of French Polynesia.

== Awards ==
- Order of Saint George, IV Class, March 16, 1919;
- Order of Saint Vladimir, III Class, May 21, 1919;
- Order of Saint Vladimir, IV Class with Swords and Bow, July 9, 1915;
- Order of Saint Anna, II Class with Swords, March 4, 1915 and April 28, 1916;
- Order of Saint Stanislaus, II Class with Swords, February 21, 1915 and April 9, 1916;
- Order of Saint Anna, III Class, 1909;
- Order of Saint Stanislaus, III Class, 1905;
  - Swords and a Bow for the Order of Saint Stanislaus, III Class, June 4, 1916;
- Order of Saint Anna, IV Class with the Inscription "For Courage", December 27, 1916;
- George Arms, May 1, 1915 and November 23, 1915;
- Insignia of the Military Order "For the Great Siberian Campaign", August 30, 1920;
- Highest Favor, 1916;
- French War Cross with Palme, declared by order of the Chief of Staff of the Supreme Commander, September 5, 1919.

== Ranks ==
- Lieutenant General – April 1920;
- Major General – March 16, 1919;
- Colonel – July 18, 1918;
- Lieutenant Colonel – March 22, 1916, seniority from August 1, 1915;
- Captain – September 22, 1915, seniority from February 9, 1915, for distinction in deeds;
- Staff Captain – January 7, 1914, seniority from May 5, 1913;
- Lieutenant – December 3, 1909, seniority from May 5, 1909, for length of service;
- Second Lieutenant – May 5, 1905, for long service.

== Family ==
- The first wife was a nurse who died of typhus and was buried in Nikolsk–Ussuriysky;
- With his second wife he had a son Boris Smolin, who was born in the United States and immigrated to Israel in mid-1960s. His grandson, Avigdor Smolin, an officer in the Barak Armored Brigade of the Israeli Army, was killed in 1982 during the Lebanon War. According to an article in the Vesti newspaper dated November 7, 2006, the General of the Kolchak's Army has about 20 grandchildren and great–grandchildren living in Israel.

== Writings ==
- Alapaevsk Tragedy; the Murder of the Russian Grand Dukes by the Bolsheviks (Manuscript);
- Russian General Innokenty Smolin in Tahiti (Letter) – A New Russian Word – 1940 – September 11
