= Order of the Great Siberian Ice March =

Insignia of the military order for the Great Siberian Ice March
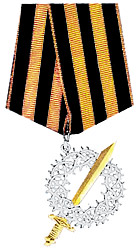
- Campaign: Great Siberian Ice March
- Established: 11 February 1920
- Ribbons, 1st and 2nd class

The Insignia of the military order for the Great Siberian Ice March (Russian: Знак отличия Военного ордена «За Великий Сибирский поход») was a campaign medal of the White movement during the Russian Civil War. The insignia, a variation of the Cross of St. George, was established on 11 February 1920, by order of the commander of the Eastern Front of the remnants of Kolchak's Russian Army, Major-General Sergei Voytsekhovsky. The decoration was awarded only to individuals who had participated in the Great Siberian Ice March. The number of awards was limited by the number of soldiers and refugees that came to Transbaikalia from the Eastern Front.

The two-class insignia was established in February 1920 by Voytsekhovsky. The insignia consisted of a silver crown of thorns pierced by a golden sword, which alluded to the insignia worn by participants of the Kuban Ice March. The 1st class of the insignia was awarded to troops and staff officers and worn on the ribbon of St. George. The remainder of participants in the march were entitled to the 2nd class of the insignia, worn on the ribbon of the Order of Saint Vladimir.

An order issued on 27 April signed by Voytsekhovsky named the first recipients of the decoration. Recipients of the 1st class of the insignia included Voytsekhovsky himself, former commander of the 2nd Separate Rifle Corps Lieutenant General Konstantin Sakharov, 2nd Corps commander Lieutenant General Grigory Verzhbitsky, and front chief of staff Major General Sergei Shepikhin.

By mid-1921, 7,173 insignias of the second class were produced. 582 people received the insignia of the 2nd class, including 136 nurses. Orders of the Far Eastern Army survive listing the names of 4,932 recipients of the insignia. Insignia were first manufactured in Chita and Vladivostok, and White émigrés continued to produce the insignias in exile in Harbin, Paris, and Berlin. The insignias produced in exile were made without reference to the order establishing the insignia, and contained design deviations that eventually made them resemble the Kuban Ice March insignia.
