= Alexey Schastny =

Russian and Soviet naval commander (1881–1918)

Alexey Mikhaylovich Schastny
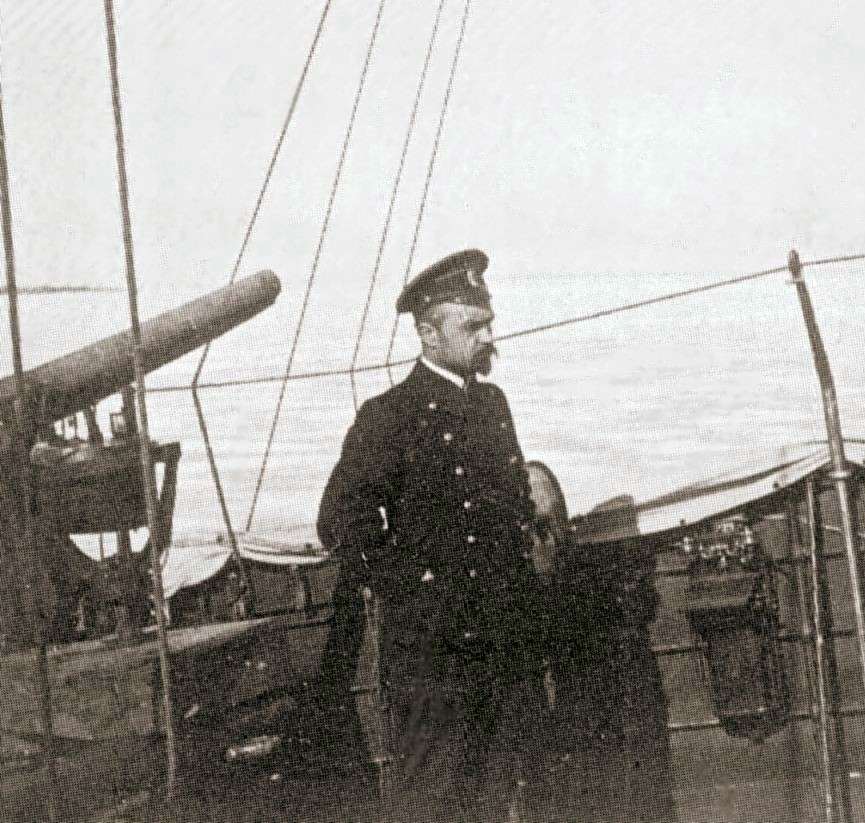
- Alexey Schastny
- Born: October 16, 1881; Zhytomyr, Ukraine, Russian Empire
- Died: July 22, 1918 (aged 36); Moscow, Soviet Russia
- Military career
- Allegiance: Russian Empire; Soviet Russia
- Branch: Imperial Russian Navy; Red Fleet
- Service years: 1901–1918
- Rank: Captain 1st Rank
- Commands: Baltic Fleet
- Conflicts: Russo-Japanese War; World War I Russian Civil War (executed)
- Awards: Order of St. Anna; Order of Saint Stanislaus

Alexey Mikhailovich Schastny (Russian: Алексе́й Миха́йлович Ща́стный) (1881–1918) was a Russian and Soviet naval commander. He commanded the Baltic Fleet during the Ice Cruise. He was executed on the order of the Soviet judge M. Karklin in June 1918 on the charges of organizing a dictatorship of the Baltic Fleet in separation from the Soviet Union.

== Life ==
Schastny was born into a military family in Zhytomyr, Ukraine. His father Mihail Mikhaylovich Schastny, was a major general of artillery in the Imperial Russian Army. Schastny was educated in the Vladimir Kiev cadet Corps (a military school) 1892-1896. He graduated second in his class from the Sea Cadet Corps in 1901 and completed the mine warfare officers class in 1905.

His initial service was aboard the battleship Sevastopol, transferring to the cruiser Diana he served during the Russo-Japanese War and was interned with his ship in Saigon. On returning to Russia, Schastny served in the Kronstadt Naval Base as an instructor in the Torpedo School (1906–1909) and as Flag Lieutenant to the commander destroyers, Baltic Fleet. In 1912-1914 he was transferred to the Caspian Sea to co-ordinate the building of radio transmitters.

During World War I, Schastny served as second officer on the dreadnought Poltava, and as commander of the minelayer Pogranichnik. In 1917 he became Flag Captain to the commander Baltic Fleet.

Schastny was given command of the Baltic Fleet in 1918 and was responsible for organising the evacuation of the fleet from Helsinki to Kronshtadt in March and April 1918. The Baltic was frozen and the ice cruise took nearly a month. The ships evacuated comprised 236 vessels and included 6 battleships, 5 cruisers, 59 destroyers and 12 submarines.

Schastny however fell foul of Trotsky and was arrested on 27 May 1918 for high treason. Trotsky declared at his trial that: "Schastny strongly and steadily deepened the gulf between the navy and the Soviet government. Wreaking havoc, he has consistently put forward his candidature for the role of saviour. He was the vanguard of the conspiracy of the officers of the mine divisions, he openly put forward the slogan ‘dictatorship of the fleet’.”Schastny was sentenced to death and shot on the orders of the Revolutionary tribunal on 22 June 1918.

In his testimony before the Revolutionary Military Tribunal, Trotsky referenced accounts of other naval commanders such as Admiral Zelyonoy that Shchastny had made unauthorised orders to blow up Fort Ino, disobeyed orders to negotiate with German command, possessed implicatory documents in his briefcase and refused to arrest several naval mutineers who sought to openly overthrow the Soviet government with a proposed resolution for a "dictatorship of the Baltic fleet".

According to Dmitrii Fedotoff-White, an officer in the Tsarist Navy and supporter of the White Army, Schastny had expressed anti-Bolshevik sentiments and had threatened in early 1918 that the Baltic Navy would bring the Soviet government to an end.

Schastny was married to Antonina Nikolayevna (née Priyemskaya) and had two children; a daughter Galina (1913–1982) and a son Lev (1915-2002). Schastny was rehabilitated after the fall of the Soviet Union. A street was named after him in his native Zhytomyr in 1992.

== Sources ==
- Biography in Russian
- - the first victim page in Russian
- - Article about the Ice Cruise from Novoye Vremya in Russian
- - Article in Russian
