= Vladimir Kantakuzen =

Former Russian Major General (1872-1937)

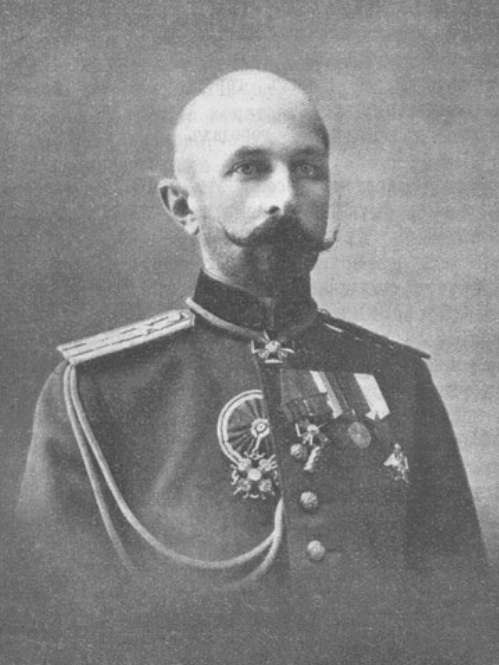
- Kantakuzen in 1915
- Born: 19 July [O.S. 7 July] 1872; Bessarabia Governorate, Russian Empire
- Died: 16 July 1937 (aged 64); Chișinău, Kingdom of Romania or Ocnița, Kingdom of Romania
- Military career
- Allegiance: Russian Empire; Russian state
- Branch: (Russian Empire) Russian Imperial Army; White Army
- Service years: 1890–1920
- Rank: Major general
- Conflicts: Russo-Japanese War; First World War; Russian Civil War
- Awards: Golden Weapon for Bravery; Order of St. George Fourth Class; Order of Saint Anna Third Class; Order of Saint Stanislaus Second and Third Classes

Prince Vladimir Georgievich Kantakuzen (Russian: Владимир Георгиевич Кантакузен; 19 July [O.S. 7 July] 1872 – 16 July 1937) was a Russian major general who saw action in the Russo-Japanese War and the First World War.

== Biography ==
Vladimir Kantakuzen was descended from the noble Romanian Cantacuzino family in Bessarabia Governorate: son of George Grigorievich Kantakusen.

Kantakuzen graduated from the 4th Moscow Cadet Corps (1892) and Mikhailovsky Artillery School (1895), was graduated lieutenant in the 15th cavalry artillery battery.

Ranks: lieutenant (1897), staff-captain (1901), podyesaul (1902), yesaul (1905), captain (1905), lieutenant colonel (1909), colonel (1915), major general (1917).

He was transferred to the 3rd Transbaikal Cossack battery. As part of it participated in Russian-Japanese War, also fought in the 1st Frontier Zaamursky cavalry regiment, the 4th battery of 1st Siberian Rifle Artillery Brigade.

After the war he was returned to the 15th Cavalry Artillery Battery. Commanded the 2nd reserve infantry battery (1908-1909), the 19th cavalry artillery battery (since 1909). In 1913 he graduated from the Artillery Officers' School.

In First World War he commanded the 9th cavalry division, served as inspector of artillery of the 2nd Cavalry Corps (Russia) (1914-1917). He was awarded the order of St. George 4th degree

"For his actions during the battle on August 11, 1914 in the village of La. 1914 at the village of Lapy-Polsky, left without cover, with excellent courage, repulsed with buckshot attack of three squadrons of Hungarian hussars and the bicycle riders who came after them, suddenly attacked the left flank and rear of the battery, and thereby saved his guns from the capture of the enemy."

and St. George's Arms

"For having acted brilliantly at the head of the battery, which was the only one to cross to the left bank of the San and at the section of the 42nd Infantry Division (Russia) with its fire from 1200 paces at all times successfully assisted the infantry."

In 1917 he commanded the 9th Kiev Hussar Regiment (March–May) and the His Majesty's Hussar Life Guards Regiment (from 8 May to October), was wounded.

Participated in the White Movement in Siberia. Commanded the 2nd Ufa Cavalry Division (September 1919-March 1920). Participated in the Great Siberian Ice March.

After the end of the Russian Civil War emigrated to France. In 1921 he participated in the Reichenhall monarchist congress. He was a member of the Association of Cavalry Artillery. Then moved to Romania, died in Bessarabia.

== Awards ==
- Order of St. Stanislaus 3d class with swords and bow (1904);
- Order of St. Anna 3d class with swords and bow (1904);
- Order of St. Stanislaus, 2nd Class, with swords and bow (1907);
- Order of St. George 4th class (VP 03.02.1915);
- Order of St. George, 4th Class (GP 09.03.1915).

== Sources ==
- "Vladimir Kantakuzen" (in Russian). «Russian army in a Great war» project.
