= Verzhbitsky =

Verzhbitsky (Russian: Вержбицкий) is a surname. Notable people with the surname include:

- Grigory Verzhbitsky (1875–1942), Russian military officer
- Viktor Verzhbitsky (born 1959), Russian actor
- Nicolai Verzhbitsky (born 1980), Italian-Moldovan author
