= Far Eastern Army =

- Дальневосточная армия
- Active: 20 February 1920 – 12 September 1921
- Allegiance: White Army
- Size: 29,000 bayonets and sabers 200 guns 9 armored trains
- Engagements: Civil War in Russia: Chita Operations

The Far Eastern Army was a military formation of Cossack and White rebel units in the Far East (20 February 1920 – 12 September 1921), formed by the former ataman of the Trans–Baikal Cossack Army, Lieutenant General Grigory Semyonov from three corps of the Eastern Front, under whose command it took active participation in battles with the People's Revolutionary Army of the Far Eastern Republic and red partisans in Transbaikalia from April to October 1920, creating the so–called "Chita Plug". Reached its maximum number in the fall of 1920 – 29 thousand people. In November 1920, the Far Eastern Army relocated to Primorye, where it continued to fight until November 1922.

== Creation ==
In January 1920, units of the 2nd and 3rd Armies of Kolchak and Kappel made their way to Transbaikalia during the Siberian Ice Campaign. In February 1920, these units were combined with the 6th East Siberian Corps of Ataman Grigory Semyonov into the Armed Forces of the Russian Eastern Outskirts. The Moscow Group of Troops of General Sergey Voitsekhovsky upon arrival in Chita, 15 March 1920, became known as the Far Eastern (White) Army, consisting of three corps. On 27 April 1920, these units formed the Far Eastern Army (Order No. 311 of Commander–in–Chief Grigory Semyonov) and included the 1st Trans–Baikal Corps (Chita Infantry and Manchurian Special Ataman Semenov Divisions), the 2nd Siberian Corps (Irkutsk and Omsk Infantry Divisions, Volunteer Brigade and the Siberian Cossack Regiment), the 3rd Volga Corps (Ufa, Consolidated Rifle and Orenburg Cossack Divisions, Volga Consolidated Separate Named After General Kappel and the 1st Separate Cavalry Brigades). In Transbaikalia in 1920, the Far Eastern Army fought the enemy together with the Cossack troops of the Eastern Outskirts (the Transbaikal Cossack Division, the Amur and Ussuri Cossack Brigades) and the Asian (Foreign) Cavalry Division (Buryat–Mongol and Tungus horse formations).

== In Transbaikalia ==
In April 1920, the Far Eastern Army successfully repelled two attempts by the People's Revolutionary Army of the Far Eastern Republic in the west and east of the Amur Front to break through to Chita. In the summer there were local battles. In August–September 1920, the question of evacuating the armed forces of the Eastern Outskirts, including the Far Eastern Army, from Transbaikalia to Primorye, where the main warehouses with ammunition and weapons were located, began to be discussed. Unlike the commanders of Kolchak's Army, ataman Grigory Semyonov was categorically against this plan, believing that the red units at the moment did not have sufficient forces to break through the Chita Plug. However, on 1 October 1920, the Chief of Staff of the Commander–in–Chief Nikolai Lokhvitsky, unauthorized, violating the order of the Commander–in–Chief Grigory Semyonov, began to evacuate the 3rd Corps of the Far Eastern Army, creating a gap in the eastern defense, and thereby gave the Amur Front of partisan detachments an opportunity to go on the offensive. Taking advantage of this breakthrough of the partisans, the People's Revolutionary Army of the Far Eastern Republic launched an offensive in mid–October. After that, Grigory Semyonov was forced to agree to the withdrawal of his troops from Transbaikalia. By November 1920, all units of the Far Eastern Army were evacuated.

== In the Ussuri Region ==
During the transfer of troops along the Sino–Eastern Railway, the Far Eastern Army was almost completely disarmed by the Chinese authorities. In Primorye, mainly on the territory of the railway from Grodekovo Station to Ussuriysk, soldiers and officers were disguised as people who had come to find employment from Manchuria in Primorye. By orders of Grigory Semyonov, the Commander–in–Chief of All Armed Forces and the Marching Chieftain of All Cossack Troops of the Russian Eastern Outskirts, No. 700/a, 703/a, 705/a, dated 25, 28 and 30 November 1920, all headquarters and institutions of the Far Eastern Army were declared disbanded and located in the state of reorganization.

Part of the troops of the Far Eastern Army, released from the command of Grigory Semyonov, including the command of the 2nd and 3rd Corps, refused to obey his orders. These troops took an active part in the overthrow of the Provisional Government of the Primorye Regional Zemstvo Council, headed by the Bolshevik Antonov, and in the establishment of the power of the Provisional Priamurye Government headed by Spiridon Merkulov in May 1921.

By order of the Priamurye Provisional Government No. 36 of 1 June 1921, the commander of the Far Eastern Army, Lieutenant General Verzhbitsky was appointed Commander of All the Troops on the territory of the Priamurye Region, and the army headquarters was disbanded and turned to form the headquarters of the Priamurye Provisional Government troops (orders of the commander of the Priamurye Provisional Government No. 1, 32 of 1 and 18 June 1921).

In connection with the non–recognition of Grigory Semyonov as the Commander–in–Chief of All Troops by the government of Merkulov and the departure of Grigory Semyonov abroad, all the directorates and institutions of the army under his command were declared disbanded, and the personnel were transferred to the command of the commander of the Grodekovo Group of Forces, Lieutenant General Faddey Glebov, who from 12 September 1921, was subordinated to the Priamurye Provisional Government and formed the basis of the armed forces of the Priamurye State Formation.

== Command Staff of the Far Eastern Army ==
Supreme Commander–in–Chief of the Far Eastern Army

- Lieutenant General (Ataman of the Trans–Baikal Cossack Host) Grigory Semyonov.

Army Commanders:

- Major General Sergey Voitsekhovsky (20 February – 27 April 1920);
- Lieutenant General Nikolai Lokhvitsky (27 April – 22 August 1920);
- Lieutenant General Grigory Verzhbitsky (23 August 1920 – May 1921).

Chiefs of Staff of the Army:

- General Staff Major General Konstantin Akintievsky (3 May – 28 July 1920);
- General Staff Major General Fyodor Puchkov (28 July 1920 – 18 June 1921).

Corps Commanders:

- 1st Zabaikalsky:
  - Lieutenant General Dmitry Semyonov (10 March – 23 June 1920);
  - Major General Georgy Matsievsky (from 23 July 1920).
- 2nd Siberian:
  - Lieutenant General Grigory Verzhbitsky (February – 23 August 1920);
  - Major General Innokenty Smolin (from 23 August 1920).
- 3rd Povolzhsky:
  - Major General Viktorin Molchanov.

Headquarters Location: Chita, Grodekovo, Nikolsk–Ussuriysky.
