= White Rebel Army =

Large military formation of the Priamurye Provisional Government

The White Rebel Army was a large military formation of the Priamurye Provisional Government of the White Movement during the Civil War in Russia, created in 1921 from the remnants of the White Armies of the Eastern Front – Semyonov–Kappel troops and operating in the Far East, in the Amur Region and Primorye from 1921 to 1922.

== Background and history of formation ==
On May 26, 1921, with the overthrow of the government of the Primorskaya Zemsky Administration headed by the Bolshevik Vasily Antonov in Vladivostok by the white rebels, the Priamurye State Formation was established. Power was soon transferred to the Congress of Non–Socialist Organizations of the Far East, which elected a Provisional Amur Government. In a matter of days, the Provisional Amur government established its own armed forces, which were based on units of the Far Eastern Army, which were previously part of the armies of General Vladimir Kappel and Ataman Grigory Semyonov. The United States of America and Japan provided comprehensive support to the new state formation, while the latter also provided military assistance at the expense of the Japanese troops stationed in Primorye during the intervention. General Grigory Verzhbitsky was appointed commander–in–chief of the armed forces on May 31, 1921. At that moment, for the first time in Russian historiography, the name White Rebel Army appeared, parts of which became the basis of the formed armed forces. Major General Viktorin Molchanov became the head of the army, partially assembled from the units of the Grodekov group of forces (later – the 2nd Corps of General Innokenty Smolin). Officially, the existence of the army was recognized only in November 1921.

== Composition ==
As of November 1921, the White Rebel Army of Viktorin Molchanov included:

- 3rd Rifle Corps (about 4,200 bayonets and 1,770 sabers), Major General Viktorin Molchanov; with his
- 1st Rifle Brigade (Colonel Pyotr Gludkin, May 25, 1921 – May 15, 1922; Major General Yevgeny Vishnevsky, May 15 – October 25, 1922); and its 1st Jäger Regiment, 2nd Ural Rifle Regiment (Colonel Vladimir Gamper), 1st Horse–Jäger Regiment (Colonel Viktor Vrashtel);
- Primorsky Detachment and its 3rd Volunteer Regiment, 4th Omsk Regiment;
- Izhevsk–Votkinsk Brigade (Colonel Avenir Efimov) with its Izhevsk Regiment, Votkinsk Regiment, 1st Volunteer Regiment (Colonel Cherkes), Krasno–Ufa Squadron;
- Volga Brigade (Major General Nikolai Sakharov) with its 1st Volga Regiment (Colonel von Bach), 4th Ufa Regiment (Colonel Yuri Sidamonidze), 8th Kama Regiment, 1st Cavalry Regiment, Siberian Cossack Regiment, Iman Hundreds of Ussuri Cossacks (army sergeant Shiryaev);
- 2nd Rifle Corps (about 3,000) Major General Innokenty Smolin; and its units of the former Grodekovskaya ("Semyonovskaya") group of troops:
- A Separate Rifle Brigade and its 1st Plastun Regiment (Convoy and Manchurian divisions), 2nd Plastun Regiment (Kamsky and Ussuriysky Divisions);
- Separate Combined Horse Brigade.

In the last Battle near Volochaevka on February 5–12, 1922, the White Rebel Army had in its composition:

- Group (detachment) of Colonel Argunov (2,300 bayonets and sabers);
- Group (detachment) of Colonel Shiryaev (900 bayonets and sabers);
- Group (detachment) of General Vishnevsky (500 bayonets and sabers);
- Group (detachment) of General I. N. Nikitin (500 bayonets and sabers).
- In total – about 5,000 bayonets and sabers.

== Combat path of the army: Khabarovsk Campaign ==
In 1921, the White Rebel Army waged active hostilities in the southern Primorye and Amur Regions. In November 1921, the White Guards began to clean up the territories controlled by the Amur State Formation from partisan detachments. In historiography, this operation is usually called the Khabarovsk Campaign of the White Rebel Army. In the period from November to December, Amginsk and Khabarovsk were captured by the White Guards. The successes achieved by the detachments of Generals Smolin and Sakharov alarmed the leadership of the Far Eastern Republic, and by the beginning of 1922 a large group of Reds was concentrated in the Khabarovsk Region under the command of Blucher, which already in January launched an offensive and threw off the Whites. General Molchanov makes a difficult decision to leave Khabarovsk and withdraw troops to Vladivostok. Thus, having taken Khabarovsk, but failed to rouse the masses to revolt, the general, under the onslaught of the People's Revolutionary Army of the Far Eastern Republic, withdrew most of the troops to Primorye. However, after the crushing defeat of the White Rebel Army near Volochaevka (the irrecoverable losses of the White Rebels exceeded 1,000 people), inflicted by the Eastern Front of the Red Army under the command of Blucher, by February 1922 it will be completely occupied by the Red Army. The most difficult battles, in which the White Rebel Army participated, took place near Olgokhta and In in December 1921: the Volzhsky and Kamsky Regiments lost up to 85% of their personnel, from 60 to 80 people remained in the ranks of 470 fighters.

== Reformation and further destiny ==
By the beginning of spring 1922, the position of the White Guards and Japanese interventionists in the Far East became critical. The Whites were on the verge of total defeat, and only the continued support from the Japanese side delayed their final destruction. After a series of defeats of the White Rebel Army and a sharp aggravation of the political situation in Primorye, as well as ideological disagreements between the former "Kappelists" and "Semyonovites", the former demanded the convocation of the "People's Assembly". To avoid bloodshed and armed clashes, the political and military elite of the occupation troops of the interventionists decided to convene the "Zemsky Sobor" in Vladivostok on July 7, 1922, the result of which was the creation of the "Priamurskiy Zemsky Government" headed by General Dieterichs, who was simultaneously appointed Commander–in–Chief of Primorsky People's Militia, named – "Zemsky Army" in the rank of "Zemsky Voevoda". Already at the beginning of July, units of the White Rebel Army, led by General Molchanov, were regrouped into the so–called "Volga Group" and, becoming part of the "Zemskaya Army", continued armed resistance to the troops of the Far Eastern Republic and parts of the Workers' and Peasants' Red Army. On September 3, 1922, Japanese troops left the evacuation zone and the "Zemskaya Rat" was left without foreign support. Shocked by the actions of the Japanese, Dieterichs set for September 4 the beginning of his last campaign against the People's Revolutionary Army of the Far Eastern Republic. By the end of October 1922, after the failed battles on the Ussuri River and at Chalcedon, Mikhail Konstantinovich Dieterikhs said that further resistance was considered impossible. On October 17, the voivode gave an order to retreat and prepare for the evacuation. On October 25, the Amur Zemsky Territory, and with it the "Zemsky Troops" ceased to exist.

== Criticism ==
- Anastasia Yalanskaya, a journalist for Parlamentskaya Gazeta, in the article "The Civil War Ended 97 Years Ago", writes that the defeat of the White Rebel Army in the Nikolsk–Ussuriysky Area by units of the People's Revolutionary Army of the Far Eastern Republic was the last battle of the Civil War, which predetermined the collapse of the White movement in Russia.
- Oleg Kotov, journalist of the "City on Bir" publication, citing employees of the Museum of Local Lore of the Jewish Autonomous Region, writes that in fact, in the Battle of Volochaevka, described in Soviet historiography as a great victory for the Red Army, the losses of the White Rebel Army were lower than that of the People's Revolutionary Army of the Far Eastern Republic. The Red Army also had more weapons and personnel than the White Rebels, and the retreat of the "Molchanovites" was, rather, tactical and was competently organized. Kotov also claims that information about the presence of the Japanese occupation forces in the area of clashes has not been confirmed.
- In February 2019, as part of commemorative events timed to coincide with the anniversary of the Battle of Volochaevka, the heads of the regional branches of the Communist Party of the Russian Federation of the Khabarovsk Territory, Primorsky Territory and the Jewish Autonomous Region said: "The Battle of Volochaevka became the most important event that influenced the entire further history of our country and all mankind". It was the victory over the White Rebel Army, according to members of the Communist Party, that allowed the creation of the Soviet Union.

== In culture ==
- Details about the White Rebel Army are described in the autobiographical book by Viktorin Molchanov "The Last White General". The literary collection is based on an interview given by General Molchanov to B. Raymond, an employee of the library of the University of California at Berkeley in 1970. The collection also includes articles from the series "Struggle in the East of Russia and Siberia", first published in 1974.
- Viktorin Molchanov and his White Rebel Army are present in the last episode of Sergey Ursulyak's 16–episode television feature film "Isaev". It was he who rejected Blucher's ultimatum and continued to fight the Reds to the last. The role of Molchanov is played by Alexander Porokhovshchikov.
- The White Rebel Army is mentioned in Nikita Mikhalkov's Russian 6–episode documentary "Russians Without Russia".
- The White Rebel Army is described in detail in the book by Boris Filimonov "White Rebels".
- The Khabarovsk Campaign of the White Rebel Army is touched upon in the book by Svetlana Bakonina "The Church Life of the Russian Emigration in the Far East in 1920–1931".

== See also ==
- Russian Civil War
- White movement
- White emigration

== Sources ==
- Haim Eidus. Japan From the First to the Second World War [Text] / Professor Haim Eidus; Academy of Sciences of the Soviet Union. Institute of World Economy and World Politics – [Leningrad]: State Publishing House of Political Literature, 1946 (Printing House Printing House) – 247 Pages
- Avdeeva N. A. Five Years of Heroic Struggle (1918–1922) [Text]: [How the Interventionists and White Guards Were Defeated in the Far East]: A Short Historical Sketch / N. A. Avdeeva, G. S. Chechulina – Blagoveshchensk: Khabarovsk Book Publishing House. [Amur Branch], 1972 – 78 Pages, 4 Sheets of Illustrations
- Vladimir Fomin. White Insurrectionary Rebellion on the Amur and Its Defeat in 1924 / Vladimir Fomin, Konstantin Fomin – Moscow: [Without Publishing House], 2005 – 151 Pages
- Ivan Serebrennikov. Civil War in Russia: The Great Retreat / Ivan Serebrennikov; Compiled and foreword by W. A. Mayer – Moscow: ACT Publishing House LLC; ZAO Research and Production Enterprise "Ermak", 2003 – 695, [9] Pages – (Military History Library) // Circulation: 5,000 Copies. ISBN 5-17-019751-9 (ACT Publishing House LLC)
- Alakhverdov G. History of the Civil War in the Soviet Union, "Ripol Classic", 2013, 462 Pages
- Civil War and Military Intervention in the Soviet Union. Encyclopedia / Editorial Board, Editor–In–Chief Semyon Khromov – 2nd Edition – Moscow, "Soviet Encyclopedia", 1987
- Valery Klaving. Civil War in Russia: White Armies – Moscow: ACT Publishing House LLC; Saint Petersburg: Terra Fantastica – 637, [3] Pages: 16 Sheets, 2003
