= Dmitrii Fedotoff-White =

American historian

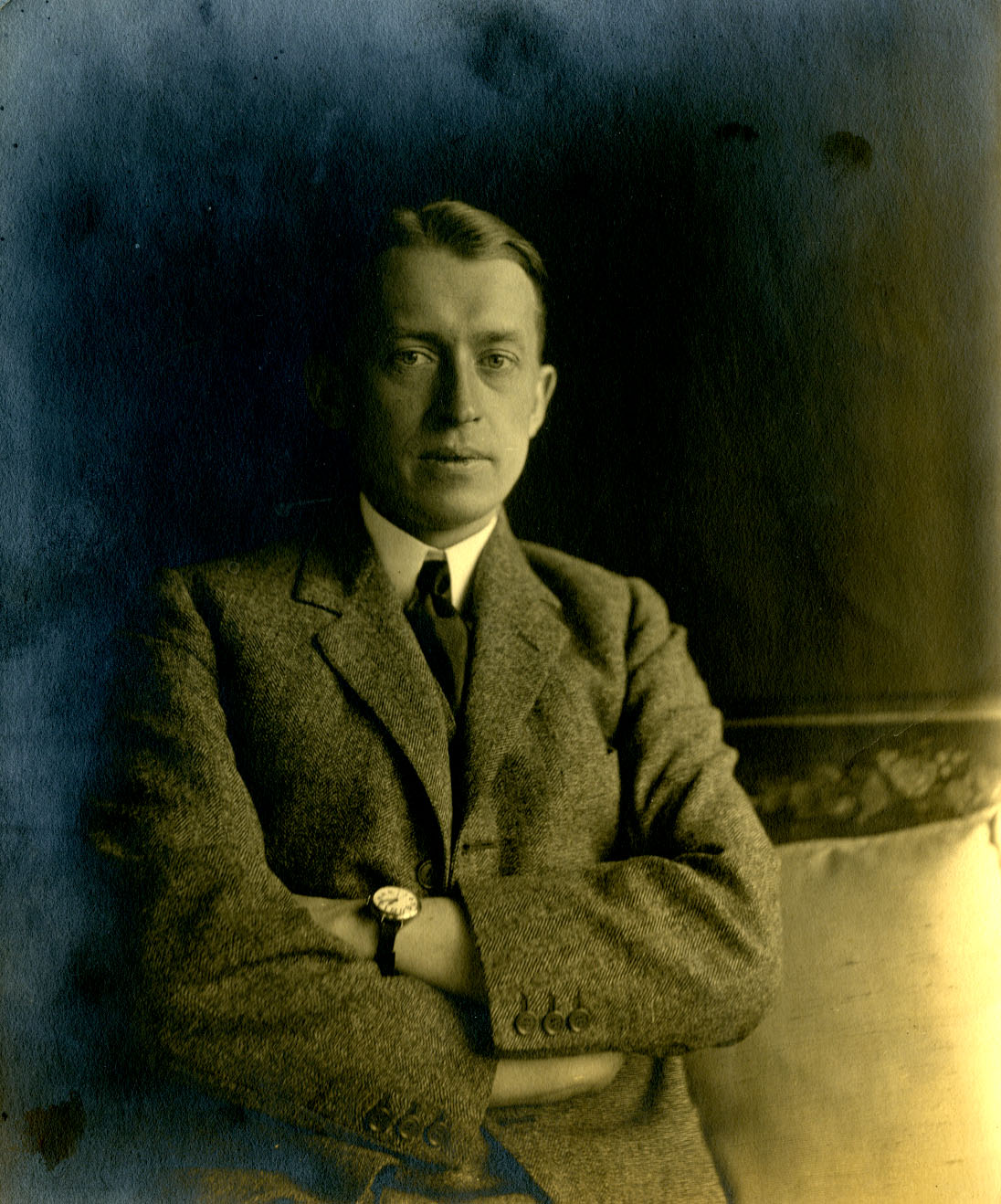
Fedotoff-White in the United States during the 1930s

Dmitrii Nikolayevich Fedotoff-White (Russian: Дмитрий Николаевич Федотов-Уайт; 1889–1950) was an Imperial Russian Navy officer from Saint Petersburg. He fought for the White forces during the Russian Civil War and wrote a book about his experiences entitled "Survival - Through War and Revolution in Russia" (1939). He also fought for the British and later escaped Russia in 1921.

== Writings ==
=== Books ===
- Survival Through War And Revolution In Russia. Philadelphia. University of Pennsylvania press. 1939.
- The Growth of the Red Army. Princeton University Press. 1944.
  - Portuguese trans.: O exército vermelho. Rio de Janeiro. 1945.

=== Articles ===
- Soviet Philosophy of War. Political Science Quarterly, Vol. 51, No. 3 (Sep., 1936), pp. 321–353.
- The Russian Navy in Trieste. During the Wars of the Revolution and the Empire. American Slavic and East European Review, Vol. 6, No. 3/4 (Dec., 1947), pp. 25–41
- An Aristocrat at Stalin's Court. American Slavic and East European Review, Vol. 9, No. 3 (Oct., 1950), pp. 207–217.
- A Russian Sketches Philadelphia, 1811–1813. The Pennsylvania Magazine of History and Biography, Vol. 75, No. 1 (Jan., 1951), pp. 3–24
