= White movement =

Major faction in the Russian Civil War

- Бѣлое движеніе Белое движение
- Flag of Russia
- Leaders: Alexander Kolchak (executed); Anton Denikin; Pyotr Wrangel; Lavr Kornilov †... and others: Mikhail Alekseyev #; Nikolai Yudenich; Grigory Semyonov (executed); Pyotr Krasnov; Sergey Markov †; Anatoly Pepelyayev (executed); Pavel Bermondt-Avalov; Mikhail Diterikhs; Roman von Ungern-Sternberg (executed)
- Dates active: 1917–1922
- Country: Russian State; South Russia (1919–1920)
- Allegiance: Russian Government (1918–1920); Government of South Russia (1920)
- Groups: White Army: Volunteer Army; White Rebel Army; White movement in Transbaikal; Ural Army; Turkestan Army; Far Eastern Army; Northern Army; Army of Wrangel; Caucasus Army; Don Army; West Russian Volunteer Army; AFSR; Northwestern Army; Siberian Army
- Active regions: Other territories: Priamurye (1920); Provisional Regional Government of the Urals (1918); Omsk Siberian Government (1918); Vladivostok Siberian Government (1918); Transcaspian Government (1918–20); Transbaikal Republic (1917–20); Komuch (1918); North Russia (1918, 1918–20); Northwest Russia (1918–19); Crimea (1918–19); Provisional Military Dictatorship of Mughan (1918–19); Don Republic (1918–20); Kuban Republic (1918–20); Eastern Okraina (1920); Tambov Land (1921)
- Ideology: Anti-communism; Majority: Russian nationalism Right-wing populism Antisemitism (Russian); Conservatism (Russian); Factions: Proto-fascism; Monarchism (Russian); Liberalism (Russian); Moderate republicanism other different ideologies
- Political position: Big tent Majority: Right-wing
- Size: 3.4 million members (peak)
- Wars: Russian Civil War: Southern; Western; Eastern; North Russia; Central Asian; Ukrainian War of Independence; Lithuanian War of Independence; Latvian War of Independence; Estonian War of Independence; Sochi conflict Mongolian Revolution

The White movement, (Note: Russian: pre–1918 Бѣлое движеніе / post–1918 Белое движение, romanized: Beloye dvizheniye, IPA: [ˈbʲɛləɪ dvʲɪˈʐenʲɪɪ]. The old spelling was retained by the Whites to differentiate from the Reds.) also known as the Whites, (Note: Russian: Бѣлые / Белые, romanized: Belyye.) was one of the main factions of the Russian Civil War of 1917–1922. It was led mainly by the right-wing and conservative officers of the Russian Empire, while the Bolsheviks who led the October Revolution in Russia, also known as the Reds, and their supporters, were regarded as the main enemies of the Whites. It operated as a system of governments and administrations united as the Russian State, which functioned as a military dictatorship throughout most of its existence, and military formations collectively referred to as the White Army, (Note: Russian: Бѣлая армія / Белая армия, romanized: Belaya armiya.) or the White Guard. (Note: Russian: Бѣлая гвардія / Белая гвардия, romanized: Belaya gvardiya.)

Although the White movement included a variety of political opinions in Russia opposed to the Bolsheviks, from the republican-minded liberals through monarchists to the ultra-nationalist Black Hundreds, and lacked a universally-accepted doctrine, the main force behind the movement were the conservative officers. The resulting movement shared many traits with widespread right-wing counter-revolutionary movements of the time, namely nationalism, racism, distrust of liberal and democratic politics, clericalism, contempt for the common man and dislike of industrial civilization. In November 1918, the movement united on an authoritarian-right platform around the figure of Alexander Kolchak as its principal leader. It generally defended the order of pre-revolutionary Imperial Russia, although the ideal of the movement was a mythical "Holy Russia", what was a mark of its religious understanding of the world. The positive program of the movement was largely summarized in the slogan of "united and indivisible Russia" which meant the restoration of imperial state borders, and its denial of the right to self-determination. The Whites are associated with pogroms and antisemitism; while the relations with the Jews featured a certain complexity, the movement was largely antisemitic, with the White generals viewing the Revolution as a result of a Jewish conspiracy. Antisemitism and more broad nationalism and xenophobia of the movement were manifested in the acts of the White Terror, which often targeted non-Russian ethnic groups of the former Russian Empire.

Some historians distinguish the White movement from the so-called "democratic counter-revolution" led mainly by the Right SRs and the Mensheviks that adhered to the values of parliamentary democracy and maintained anti-Bolshevik governments (Komuch, Ufa Directory) advocating for these values until November 1918, and then supported either the Whites or the Bolsheviks or opposed both factions, making attempts to overthrow the White administrations and create ones of their own, such as the "Political Centre" in 1920.

Following the military defeat of their movement, the Whites expelled from the USSR attempted to continue the struggle by creating armed groups which would wage guerilla warfare in the USSR. Some of the former White commanders also hoped to depose the Soviet authorities by means of collaboration with Nazi Germany during World War II. In exile, remnants and continuations of the movement remained in several organizations, some of which only had narrow support, enduring within the wider White émigré overseas community until after the fall of the European communist states in the Eastern European Revolutions of 1989 and the subsequent dissolution of the Soviet Union in 1990–1991. This community-in-exile of anti-communists often divided into liberal and the more conservative segments, with some still hoping for the restoration of the Romanov dynasty.

== Origins of the name ==
In the Russian context after 1917, "White" had three main connotations which were:

1. Reference to the French Revolution, where the forces opposing the Revolution and supporting the restoration of Bourbon monarchy used white as their symbolic colour.
2. Historical reference to absolute monarchy, specifically recalling Russia's first Tsar, Ivan III (reigned 1462–1505), at a period when some styled the ruler of Russian Tsardom Albus Rex ("the White King").
3. The white uniforms of the Imperial Russian Army worn by some White Army soldiers.

== Ideology ==
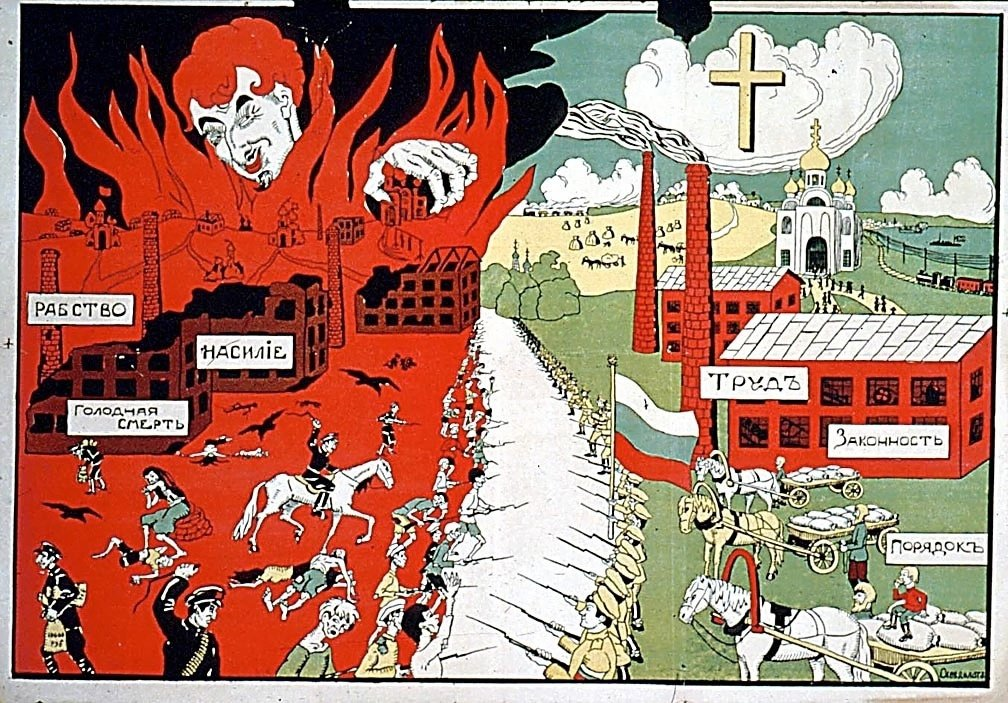
Propaganda poster of the Russian Whites, contrasting its positive ideal of a "Holy" Christian Russia to Soviet Russia of the Bolsheviks

Although the Bolsheviks had many opponents that adhered to the values of parliamentary democracy, such as the Mensheviks and the SRs, the main force of the White movement were the imperial army officers, since, unlike the moderate left politicians, they were able to organize an armed movement and had a necessary unity of common experience developed in the army and the wars the Russian Empire was involved in. Although the Whites were disunited by such factors as personal rivalries, distances between the military formations, and lack of a clearly formulated political program and doctrine and a leader with an absolute authority who could formulate those, they shared a common ideological military culture of officer corps of the Russian Empire, which included such key elements as conservatism, distrust of technology and industrial civilization, "faith in élan" as a key to victory, and conservative military anti-intellectualism. During the Civil War, the officers did not produce a political program and a critique of Bolshevism, but instead simply viewed the revolutionaries as inherently evil, viewing their struggle as a fight of Good against Evil and God against Satan, and expected the people to realize this and turn to the conservative values of the Whites. The professional officers rejected "politics", understood primarily as party activities undermining the authority of the Tsar, and modern rational political thought promoting equality and social justice, as threats to the national spirit and the army. In such worldview, the army "stood above politics", while the defense of the autocracy was not a political act, but an article of faith. This stance was not consciously monarchist, and during the February Revolution the officers did not resist the overthrow of Tsarism in order to keep the military effort; in a similar way, they mainly abstained from defending the Provisional Government against the Bolsheviks. Most officers preferred not to engage in political struggle during the initial period after the October Revolution, while the organizers of the Volunteer Army represented only the most conservative minority.

The White officers believed socialist and pacifist politicians and intellectuals to be their enemies, condemning socialism as materialistic and anti-individualistic as opposed to "spiritual" and patriotic values of the army, and pacifism as threatening these values and allied with socialism. Liberal politics were distrusted as well, and during the Civil War the Whites preferred the Tsarist bureaucrats and officers to liberal civilians to administer the White-controlled territories. Racial antisemitism was widespread in the army and in Russian society in general; the Jews could not become army officers and were mistreated in the army, the officers believing them to be guilty of spreading subversive ideologies and not being able to become good soldiers. During the Civil War, antisemitism varied among the White officers, but was a crucial element of the ideology of the Whites.

Despite their conservatism, the Whites did not openly proclaim a reactionary movement and instead attempted not to alienate potential support and to attract a broad base, avoiding controversial decisions and openly expressing their stance on the major issues, and producing programs subject to various interpretations while neglecting propaganda work and promoting positive ideals. The Whites had the stated aim to reverse the October Revolution and remove the Bolsheviks from power before a constituent assembly, dissolved by the Bolsheviks in January 1918 could be convened. There was no clear position on whether to consider the Provisional Government legitimate. However, while the socialists believed the socialist-dominated Constituent Assembly dissolved by the Bolsheviks to be legitimate, the White leaders did not recognize it and insisted on conveining a new Assembly after the Civil War. From 1918, Anton Denikin, while rejecting the outright slogans for the restoration of Tsarism popular within the officers as a possible detriment to their cause and recruitment and claiming the military could not decide for a government instead of the Russian people, began referring to a future "National Assembly". While its difference from the Constituent Assembly had never been defined, this change could imply that the Whites did not support the principles of popular sovereignty and universal suffrage. While the leaders of the movement continued to formally reject reactionary ideas, and some of the Whites accepted the ideas of the abolition of monarchy and some reforms, in general the movement sought to reestablish the traditional imperial social order. During the last phase of its existence, the movement under the leadership of Baron Pyotr Wrangel reverted to the term "Constituent Assembly", but issued a manifesto which advocated the necessity of "the Russian people" choosing "its own MASTER," implying that Wrangel meant a new Tsar.

At the same time, the historian Vladimir Brovkin argues that it fought not "for a restoration of the prerevolutionary order, nor indeed for any mundane political goal, but rather for the mythical "Holy Russia." According to Brovkin, the Whites viewed the world primarily in religious categories, and they expressed their thinking in dense religious imagery. Yet, they were products of secular society, and their 'cult', the primary object of which was Russia, was shaped by World War I and the Revolution. The Whites often depicted the state of Russia after the Revolution in terms of "defilement," "impurity," and "blasphemy", opposite to the ideals of purity and of the triumph of the spirit over matter, derived from Christian and specifically Byzantine asceticism. The Revolution was seen as sacrilege and rape, and thus the Whites saw their goal as to purify Russia by means of self-sacrifice, similarly to the crucifixion of Christ, what was expressed in rendering the 'Great Siberian Ice March' as "walk[ing] the Way of the Cross" and its direct association with the crucifixion. Thus, the Revolution and the Civil War was understood through religious and extremely polar imagery, as a struggle of nobility and baseness, freedom and slavery, purity and defilement, light and darkness, life and death, and, ultimately, God and Satan. More to it, the Whites "believed that the epochal conflict between Good and Evil was coming to its summation and that Russia was its battleground."

The movement was generally conservative, while the largest group within the movement which had leanings most similar to fascism were the Cossacks, who were led by the economic motive of defending their estates and by their anti-modern culture. Their primary leader was Pyotr Krasnov, a staunch antisemite who appealed to the Cossacks with demagogue rhetoric and ideas of a mythical Cossack past. During World War II, Krasnov would become a prominent collaborator with Nazi Germany, leading collaborationist Cossack units. Among the members of the movement could be monarchists, republicans, rightists, and Kadets. The Kadets were one of the largest liberal parties in Russia, however, many of them shifted to conservatism during the Revolution and more broadly World War I, when the Kadet party started promoting military dictatorship and territorial integrity of the Russian Empire and afterwards by its scale of support of the Whites became next to the Russian nationalist parties. At first, the Kadets as the main party of the Russian State attempted to build the government as a "collective dictatorship", until the Kolchak coup took place, and the Kadets became the supporters of Admiral Alexander Kolchak. Kolchak became the dictator of the Russian State and was recognized as the principle leader of the Whites while gaining the title of the Supreme Ruler of Russia, thus uniting the movement around himself on an authoritarian-right platform. Kolchak was a proponent of Russian nationalism and militarism, while opposing democracy which he believed to be tied to pacifism, internationalism, and socialism.

The Whites presented themselves as proponents of Russian partiotism, nationalism and conservatism as opposed to internationalism and revolutionary social programme of the Bolsheviks; the Whites relied on conservative populism which maintained that the Russian people possessed unique and valuable qualities which distinguished them from Westerners and made Western institutions in Russia inappropriate. They proclaimed that they were fighting "for Russia" and implied that Russia as a political entity could exist only on the basis of traditional social and political principles congruent with the history of Russia, and those who wanted to fundamentally change the social and political order were thus against Russia. They proclaimed that the army "stood above classes" just as above "politics" and were reluctant to solve social contradictions, partially because it would alienate the support of the landowners and owning classes. Although such leaders as Denikin and Kolchak made attempts to implement a land reform which proposed a compulsory alienation of land with compensation to former owners, these attempts were sabotaged by the lower-ranking officers and Tsarist bureaucrats to which the White leaders granted the authority to implement the reform, while the White leaders took little action to enforce the implementation of their reforms.

The Whites rejected ethnic particularism and separatism. It proclaimed the slogan of "united and indivisible Russia" which meant its denial of the right to self-determination and the restoration of imperial state borders with possible exceptions for such states as Poland and Finland; in accordance with it, the Whites attempted to operate on the territories of the former empire they regarded as "Russia" but where ethnic Russians were a minority. This principle was violated during the Estonian War of Independence, where the Russian Whites aided the Estonian Republic. However, in accordance with this principle, the Whites did not recognize the Ukrainian People's Republic and fought against it in Ukrainian War of Independence, as well as against the Mountainous Republic of the Northern Caucasus. Following this principle, Kolchak refused General Mannerheim's offer to receive military aid from Finland in return for recognizing its independence, since for Kolchak a "Russia in pieces was not Russia." Whites differed on policies toward the German Empire in its extended occupation of western Russia, the Baltic states, Poland, and Ukraine on the Eastern Front in the closing days of the World War, debating whether or not to ally with it. While such White leaders as Pyotr Krasnov (Don Republic) and Pavlo Skoropadskyi (German-occupied Ukrainian State) agreed to receive support from Germany, many other leaders remained loyal to the Allies.

An important element of the ideology of the Whites was antisemitism. There was a certain complexity with the relations with the Jews, since the 'liberal' official White programs never featured antisemitism, and there was even a number Jewish officers in the White armies. However, antisemitism was shared by the White generals and spread by White propaganda, which blamed the Jews for the Revolution and spreading non-Russian and 'modern' values; the officers described Jews as microbes and blamed them for misfortunes ranging from military defeat to inflation and lack of foreign support, while the White Orthodox Christian priests denounced Jews as Christ-killers and called for a holy crusade against Jewish Bolshevism. Antisemitism varies among the leaders of the Whites: while for such figures as Krasnov every Jew was a conspirator against Russia, Denikin was moderate. Denikin confessed to a Jewish delegation which asked for protection that he did not like Jews and he took various steps against Jewish economic interests, but denied antisemitism of the Whites and that the pogroms directed by the Whites were directed against the Jews. While it appears that such figures as Denikin did not share the militant antisemitism of their subordinates, they did little to stop them.

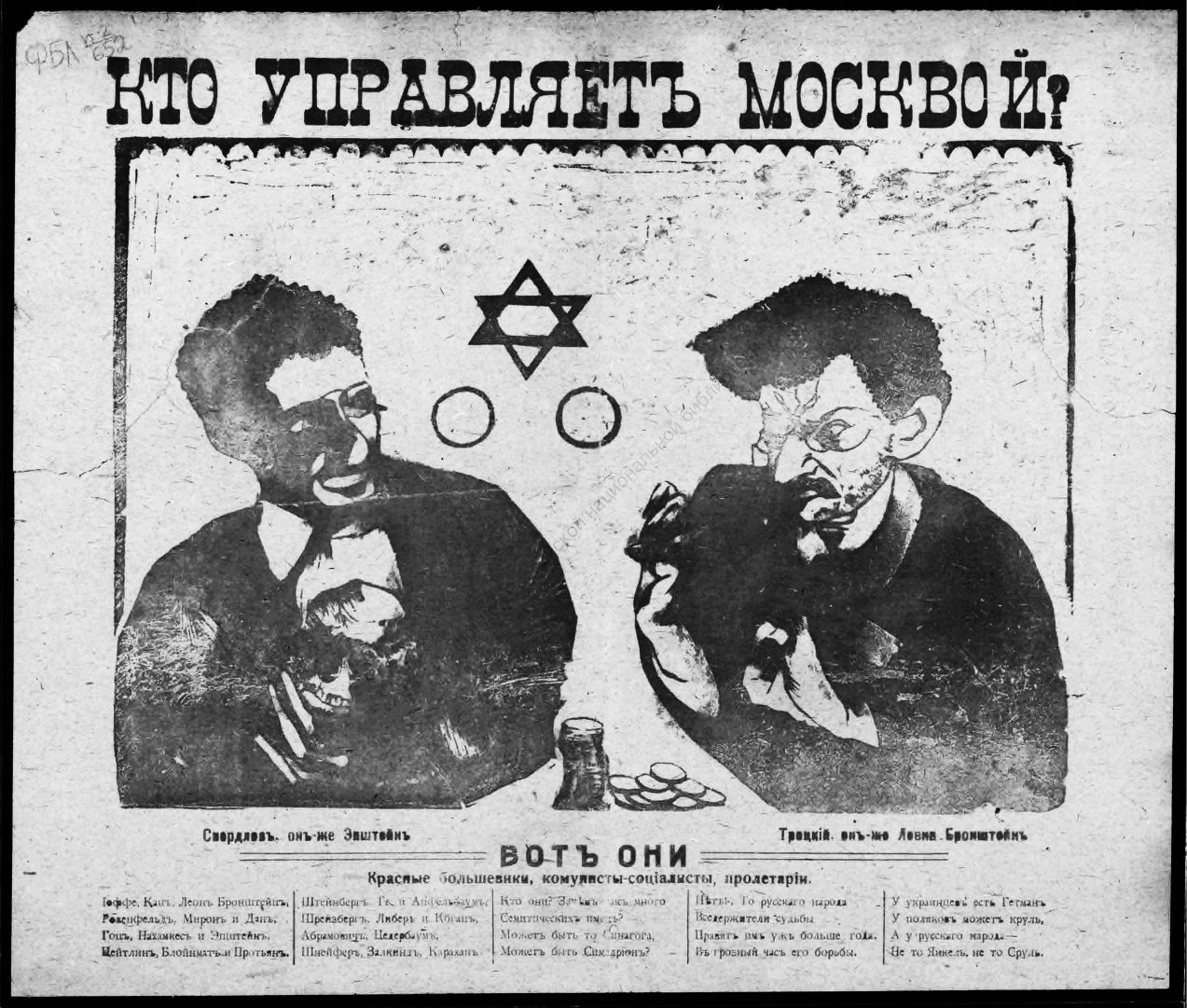
Antisemitic White propaganda poster Who Rules Moscow? Here they are – Red Bolsheviks, Communists-Socialists, Proletarians (1919), caricature of senior Bolsheviks Yakov Sverdlov and Leon Trotsky with the Star of David, depicting the Bolsheviks as Jews oppressing Russians and striving for money and power

The historian Peter Holquist describes the Russian nationalist and antisemitic underpinnings of the Russian White Terror in the following way: "Anti-Soviet commanders and foot soldiers alike believed they knew who their enemies were, and they equally believed they knew what they had to do with such foes. White commanders sifted their POWs, selecting out those they deemed undesirable and incorrigible (Jews, Balts, Chinese, Communists), and executed these individuals in groups later, a process the Whites described as "filtering." Joshua Sanborn traces the antisemitic White Terror to state-supported antisemitism of the Russian Empire:

...in the case of the Jews, we see not only the development of terror practices (like hostage-taking, decimation, mass retribution, mass deportation, rape, robbery, and sadistic, spectacularly cruel violence), but of the social intent. Most notably, efforts on the part of Ianushkevich’s Stavka to gather material on Jewish behavior in the army stressed that commanders were to gather this to prove all the “harm” that Jews posed to the army and to the nation. [...] These were processes that were justified by the war atmosphere, but whose vision extended well into the post-war period. As a result, the White Terror, like the Imperial Army's Terror campaign from 1914–1917, was revolutionary in its Terror against Jews, and who knows, might have taken this kernel even further had they prevailed in the Civil War.

The propaganda service of the Volunteer Army, the Osvag, made the claim that "the Jews must pay for everything: for the February and October revolutions, for Bolshevism and for the peasants who took their land from the owners". The organization also reissued The Protocols of the Elders of Zion. Although Denikin's troops committed only 17.2% of the pogroms (most of which were carried out by Ukrainian nationalists or by rebel armies not affiliated with any side), White officers praised soldiers who committed anti-Semitic crimes, some of whom even received bonuses.

Winston Churchill personally warned General Anton Denikin (1872–1947), formerly of the Imperial Army and later a major White military leader, whose forces effected pogroms and persecutions against the Jews:

[M]y task in winning support in Parliament for the Russian Nationalist cause will be infinitely harder if well-authenticated complaints continue to be received from Jews in the zone of the Volunteer Armies.

However, Denikin did not dare to confront his officers and remained content with vague formal condemnations.

Some warlords who were aligned with the White movement, such as Grigory Semyonov and Roman Ungern von Sternberg, did not acknowledge any authority but their own.

== Structure ==
=== White Army ===
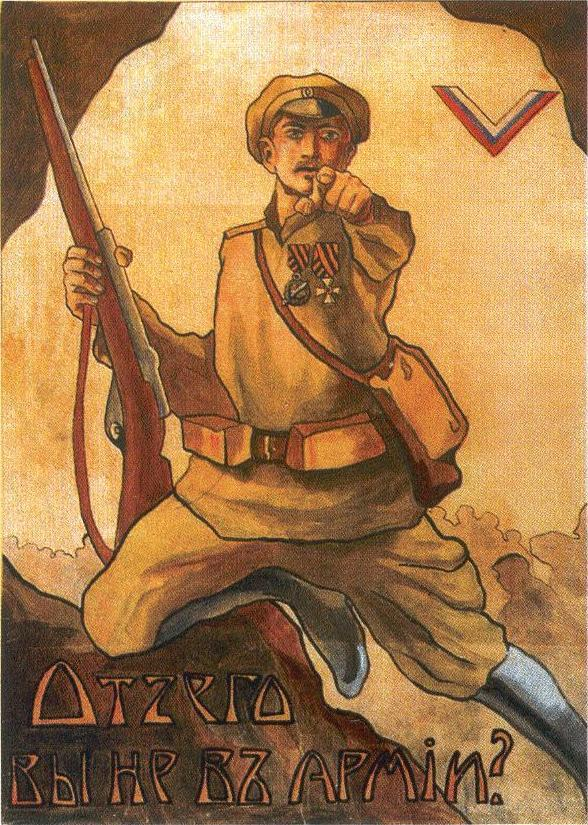
"Why aren't you in the army?", Volunteer Army recruiting poster during the Russian Civil War

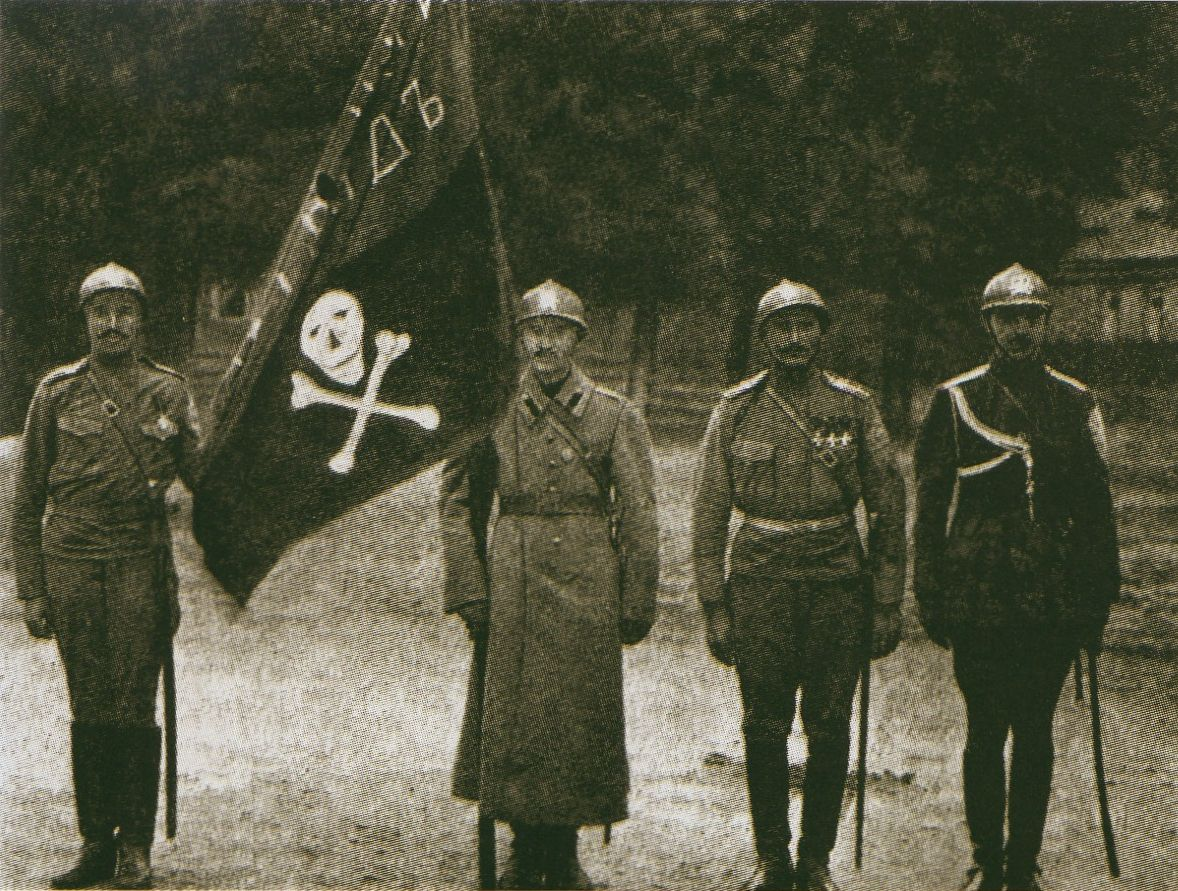
Kornilov's Shock Detachment (8th Army), later became the Volunteer Army's elite Shock Regiment

The Volunteer Army in South Russia became the most prominent and the largest of the various and disparate White forces. Starting off as a small and well-organized military in January 1918, the Volunteer Army soon grew. The Kuban Cossacks joined the White Army and conscription of both peasants and Cossacks began. In late February 1918, 4,000 soldiers under the command of General Aleksei Kaledin were forced to retreat from Rostov-on-Don due to the advance of the Red Army. In what became known as the Ice March, they traveled to Kuban in order to unite with the Kuban Cossacks, most of whom did not support the Volunteer Army. In March, 3,000 men under the command of General Viktor Pokrovsky joined the Volunteer Army, increasing its membership to 6,000, and by June to 9,000. In 1919 the Don Cossacks joined the Army. In that year between May and October, the Volunteer Army grew from 64,000 to 150,000 soldiers and was better supplied than its Red counterpart. The White Army's rank-and-file comprised active anti-Bolsheviks, such as Cossacks, nobles, and peasants, as conscripts and as volunteers.

The White movement had access to various naval forces, both seagoing and riverine, especially the Black Sea Fleet.

Aerial forces available to the Whites included the Slavo-British Aviation Corps (S.B.A.C.). The Russian ace Alexander Kazakov operated within this unit.

=== Administration ===
The White movement's leaders and first members came mainly from the ranks of military officers. Many came from outside the nobility, such as generals Mikhail Alekseyev and Anton Denikin, who originated in serf families, or General Lavr Kornilov, a Cossack.

The White generals never mastered administration; they often utilized "prerevolutionary functionaries" or "military officers with monarchististic inclinations" for administering White-controlled regions.

The White Armies were often lawless and disordered. Also, White-controlled territories had multiple different and varying currencies with unstable exchange-rates. The chief currency, the Volunteer Army's ruble, had no gold backing.

== Theatres of operation ==
Russian Civil War in the west

The Whites and the Reds fought the Russian Civil War from November 1917 until 1921, and isolated battles continued in the Far East until June 1923. The White Army—aided by the Allied forces (Triple Entente) from countries such as Japan, the United Kingdom, France, Greece, Italy and the United States and (sometimes) the Central Powers forces such as Germany and Austria-Hungary—fought in Siberia, Ukraine, and in Crimea. They were defeated by the Red Army due to military and ideological disunity, as well as the determination and increasing unity of the Red Army.

The White Army operated in three main theatres:

=== Southern front ===
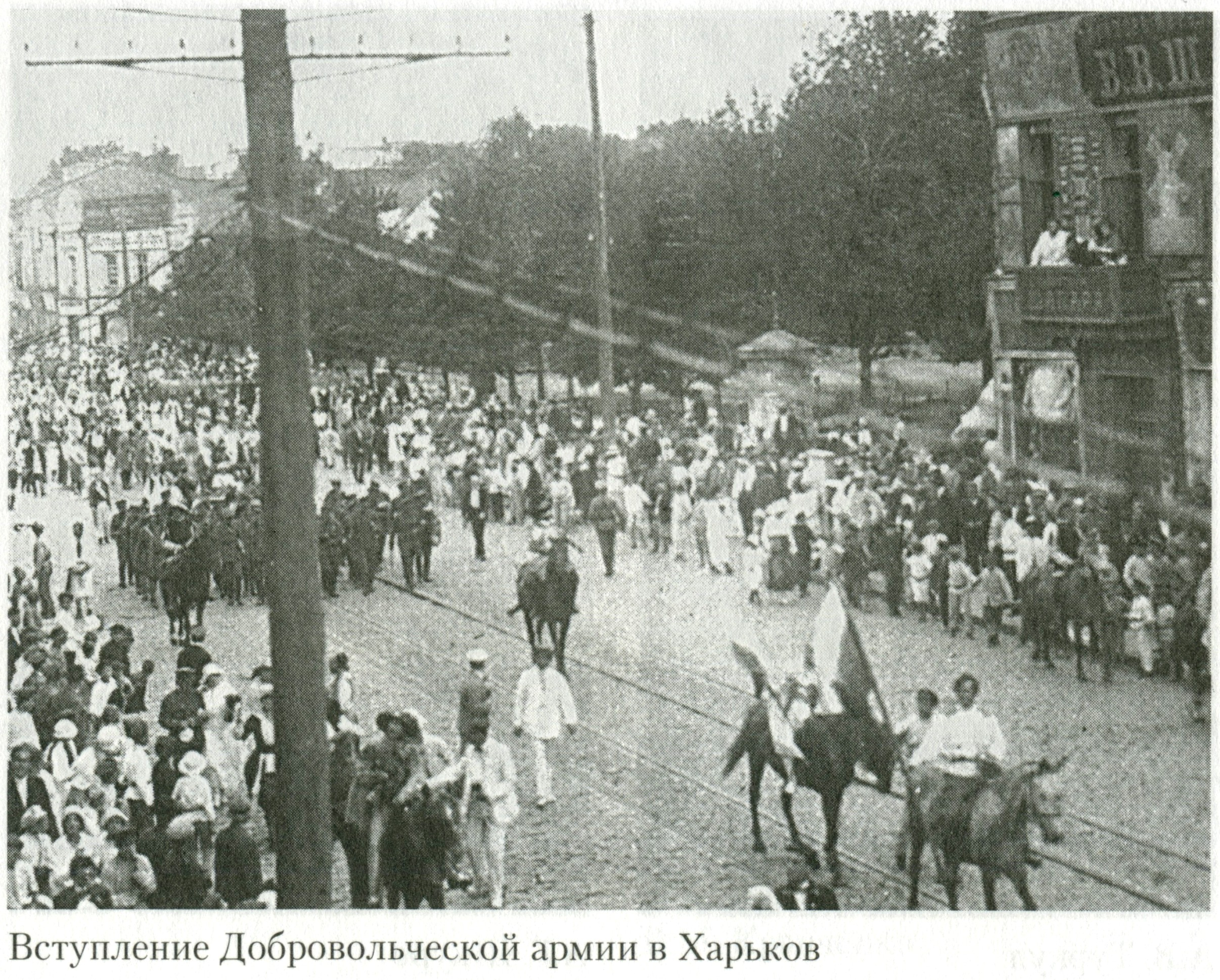
In the summer of 1919, Denikin's troops captured Kharkiv

Organization of the White Army located in the South started on 15 November 1917, (Old Style) under General Mikhail Alekseyev. In December 1917, General Lavr Kornilov took over the military command of the newly named Volunteer Army until his death in April 1918, after which General Anton Denikin took over, becoming head of the "Armed Forces of the South of Russia" in January 1919.

The Southern Front featured massive-scale operations and posed the most dangerous threat to the Bolshevik Government. At first it depended entirely upon volunteers in Russia proper, mostly the Cossacks, among the first to oppose the Bolshevik Government. On 23 June 1918, the Volunteer Army (8,000–9,000 men) began its so-called Second Kuban Campaign with support from Pyotr Krasnov. By September, the Volunteer Army comprised 30,000 to 35,000 members, thanks to mobilization of the Kuban Cossacks gathered in the North Caucasus. Thus, the Volunteer Army took the name of the Caucasus Volunteer Army. On 23 January 1919, the Volunteer Army under Denikin oversaw the defeat of the 11th Red Army and then captured the North Caucasus region. After capturing the Donbas, Tsaritsyn and Kharkiv in June, Denikin's forces launched an attack towards Moscow on 3 July, (N.S.). Plans envisaged 40,000 fighters under the command of General Vladimir May-Mayevsky storming the city.

After General Denikin's attack upon Moscow failed in 1919, the Armed Forces of the South of Russia retreated. On 26 and 27 March 1920, the remnants of the Volunteer Army evacuated from Novorossiysk to the Crimea, where they merged with the army of Pyotr Wrangel.

=== Eastern (Siberian) front ===
The Eastern Front started in spring 1918 as a secret movement among army officers and right-wing socialist forces. In that front, they launched an attack in collaboration with the Czechoslovak Legions, who were then stranded in Siberia by the Bolshevik Government, who had barred them from leaving Russia, and with the Japanese, who also intervened to help the Whites in the east. Admiral Alexander Kolchak headed the eastern White Army and a provisional Russian government. Despite some significant success in 1919, the Whites were defeated being forced back to Far Eastern Russia, where they continued fighting until October 1922. When the Japanese withdrew, the Soviet army of the Far Eastern Republic retook the territory. The Civil War was officially declared over at this point, although Anatoly Pepelyayev still controlled the Ayano-Maysky District at that time. Pepelyayev's Yakut revolt, which concluded on 16 June 1923, represented the last military action in Russia by a White Army. It ended with the defeat of the final anti-communist enclave in the country, signalling the end of all military hostilities relating to the Russian Civil War.

=== Northern and Northwestern fronts ===
Headed by Nikolai Yudenich, Evgeni Miller, and Anatoly Lieven, the White forces in the North demonstrated less co-ordination than General Denikin's Army of Southern Russia. The Northwestern Army allied itself with Estonia, while Lieven's West Russian Volunteer Army sided with the Baltic nobility. Authoritarian support led by Pavel Bermondt-Avalov and Stanisław Bułak-Bałachowicz played a role as well. The most notable operation on this front, Operation White Sword, saw an unsuccessful advance towards the Russian capital of Petrograd in the autumn of 1919.

== Post–Civil War ==
The defeated anti-Bolshevik Russians went into exile, congregating in Belgrade, Berlin, Paris, Harbin, Istanbul, and Shanghai. They established military and cultural networks that lasted through World War II (1939–1945), e.g. the Harbin and Shanghai Russians. Afterward, the White Russians' anti-communist activists established a home base in the United States, to which numerous refugees emigrated.

Moreover, in the 1920s and the 1930s the White movement established organisations outside Russia, which were meant to depose the Soviet government with guerrilla warfare, e.g., the Russian All-Military Union, the Brotherhood of Russian Truth, and the National Alliance of Russian Solidarists, a far-right anticommunist organization founded in 1930 by a group of young White emigres in Belgrade, Yugoslavia. Some White émigrés adopted pro-Soviet sympathies and were termed "Soviet patriots". These people formed organizations such as the Mladorossi, the Eurasianists, and the Smenovekhovtsy. A Russian cadet corps was established to prepare the next generation of anti-Communists for the "spring campaign"—a hopeful term denoting a renewed military campaign to reclaim Russia from the Soviet Government. In any event, many cadets volunteered to fight for the Russian Protective Corps during World War II, when a number of White Russians collaborated with Nazi Germany. The collaborators included some prominent figures of the White movement, like Pyotr Krasnov, the leader of the White Don Cossacks during the civil war.

Emblem used by white émigré volunteers in the Spanish Civil War

After the war, active anti-Soviet combat was almost exclusively continued by the National Alliance of Russian Solidarists. Other organizations either dissolved, or began concentrating exclusively on self-preservation and/or educating the youth. Various youth organizations, such as the Russian Scouts-in-Exteris, promoted providing children with a background in pre-Soviet Russian culture and heritage. Some supported Zog I of Albania during the 1920s and a few independently served with the Nationalists during the Spanish Civil War. White Russians also served alongside the Soviet Red Army during the Soviet invasion of Xinjiang and the Islamic rebellion in Xinjiang in 1937.

== Prominent people ==
- Alexander Kolchak
- Mikhail Alekseyev
- Vladimir Antonov
- Nicholas Savich Bakulin
- Pavel Bermondt-Avalov
- Stanisław Bułak-Bałachowicz
- Anton Denikin
- Mikhail Diterikhs
- Mikhail Drozdovsky
- Alexander Dutov
- Dmitrii Fedotoff-White
- Ivan Ilyin
- Nikolay Iudovich Ivanov
- Alexey Kaledin
- Vladimir Kantakuzen
- Vladimir Kappel
- Alexander Kolchak
- Lavr Kornilov
- Pyotr Krasnov
- Mikhail Kvetsinsky
- Alexander Kutepov
- Anatoly Lieven
- Konstantin Mamontov
- Sergey Markov
- Vladimir May-Mayevsky
- Evgeny Miller
- Najmuddin of Gotzo
- Konstantin Petrovich Nechaev
- Viktor Pokrovsky
- Leonid Punin
- Aleksandr Rodzyanko
- Grigory Semyonov
- Andrei Shkuro
- Roman von Ungern-Sternberg
- Pyotr Nikolayevich Wrangel
- Sergei Wojciechowski
- Nikolai Yudenich
- Boris Annenkov

== Related movements ==
After the February Revolution, Finland, Estonia, Latvia, and Lithuania declared themselves independent. However, they had a substantial Communist or Russian military presence within their newly proposed independent states at the time. Civil wars followed, wherein the anti-communist side may be referred to as White Armies, e.g. in Finland the White Guard-led, partially conscripted Finnish White Army (Finnish: Valkoinen Armeija) who fought against Soviet Russia-sponsored Red Guards. However, since they were nationalists, their aims were substantially different from the Russian White Army proper; for instance, Russian White generals never explicitly supported Finnish independence. The defeat of the Russian White Army made the point moot in this dispute. The countries remained independent and governed by non-Communist governments.

== See also ==
- Bibliography of the Russian Revolution and Civil War
- Outline of the Russian Revolution and Civil War
- Index of articles related to the Russian Revolution and Civil War
- Russian State (1918–1920)
- Allied intervention in the Russian Civil War
- Basmachi movement
- Estonian War of Independence
- Finnish Civil War
- Grand Orient of Russia's Peoples
- Russian All-Military Union
- Russian diaspora
- Russian nationalism
- Soviet–Ukrainian War
- Ukrainian War of Independence
