= White Army =

Army/faction in the Russian Civil War

- Бѣлая армія (Note: Pre-1918 spelling); Белая армия
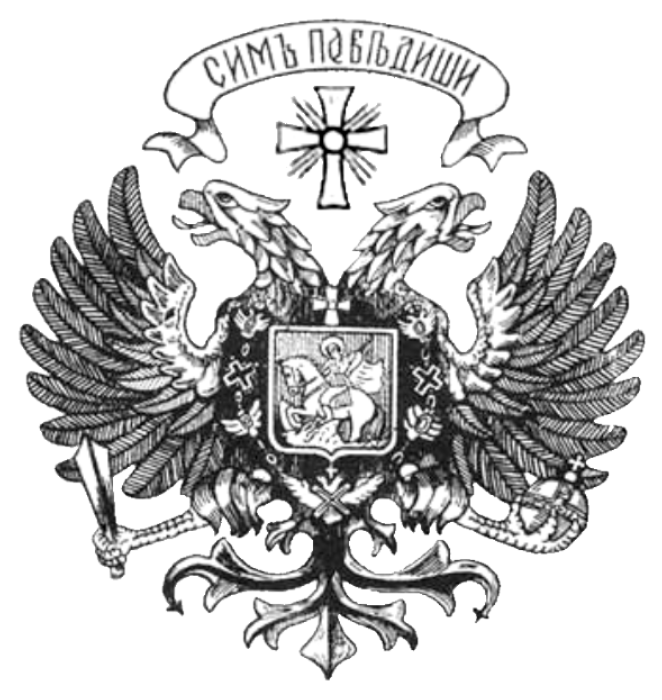
- Project of the coat of arms of the Russian State
- Active: 1917–1922
- Country: Russia
- Size: Overall Personnel: ~1,023,000 (May 1919); In combat units: ~4,000 (December 1917); ~683,000 (June 1919); ~300,000 (December 1919); ~100,000 (Summer 1920); ~8,000 (September 1922); ~1,000 (1923)
- Garrison/HQ: Russia; Outer Mongolia (1920–21); China; Persia

Commanders
- Notable commanders: Lavr Kornilov; Alexander Kolchak; Anton Denikin; Pyotr Wrangel; Nikolai Yudenich; Mikhail Drozdovsky; Mikhail Diterikhs; Anatoly Pepelyayev; Vladimir Kantakuzen

Insignia

The White Army, (Note: Russian: Белая армия, romanized: Belaya armiya; pre-reform spelling: Бѣлая армія. The pre-reform spelling was used by the Whites even afterwards to differentiate from the Reds.) also known as the White Guard, (Note: Russian: Белая гвардия, romanized: Belaya gvardiya; pre-reform spelling: Бѣлая гвардія.) the White Guardsmen, (Note: Russian: белогвардейцы, romanized: belogvardeytsi; pre-reform spelling: бѣлогвардейцы.) or simply the Whites, was a common collective name for the armed formations of the White movement and anti-Bolshevik governments during the Russian Civil War. They fought against the Red Army of Soviet Russia.

When it was created, the structure of the Russian Army during the period of the Russian Provisional Government was used, while almost every individual formation had its own characteristics. The military art of the White Army was based on the experience of the First World War which left a strong imprint on the specifics of the Russian Civil War.

== History ==
The name "White" is associated with white symbols of the supporters of the pre-revolutionary order, dating back to the time of the French Revolution, (Note: In the historiography of the French Revolution, the 1793–1794 revolutionary republican Reign of Terror of Robespierre against any suspected supporter of the Ancien Régime is also known as the "Red Terror", whereas the reactionary/anti-revolutionary monarchist pro-Bourbon mass killings and persecutions of revolutionaries and ex-Jacobins (and in southern France, Protestants) are known as the 1794–1795 First White Terror and the 1815–1816 Second White Terror.) in contrast to the name of the Red Guard detachments, and then the Red Army. For the first time, the name "White Guard" was used in Russia for Finnish police detachments created in 1906 to fight the revolutionary movement. Their members wore white bandages on their sleeves; however, this did not have a direct connection with the White Army during the Russian Civil War.

The White Armies comprised a number of different groups, who operated independently and did not share a single ideology or political goal. Their leaders were conservative or moderate generals and political leaders, each with different goals and plans to achieve them, and most of these armies did not coordinate their actions. The chain of command in each, as well as individual members, differed from experienced veterans of World War I to fresh volunteers.

The White Guards, in addition to directly fighting with the Reds as well as the Makhnovtsi, carried out the White Terror, taking part in mass executions, including assisting allied foreign interventionists (for example, 257 civilians were killed in 1919 in the course of the struggle in the village of Ivanovka of the Japanese Army and the White Guards against the pro-Bolshevik detachments of partisans).

=== Volunteer and Don Army ===
After the October Revolution, the arrested generals Lavr Kornilov, Anton Denikin, Sergey Markov and others were released by Commander-in-Chief Nikolay Dukhonin before his removal and subsequent murder by the mob and went to Don Host to Ataman Alexey Kaledin. The Don region abandoned the power of the Soviets and proclaimed independence "before the formation of a nation-wide, popularly recognized government". The first White Army was created by Mikhail Alekseyev, calling it the "Alekseyev Organization". Officers were recruited on a voluntary basis. A Volunteer Army was created from the members of this organization. Generals Kaledin and Kornilov joined him. Three months later, in April 1918, the Council of Defense of the Don Host formed the Don Army. In May 1918, the Drozdovsky brigade joined the Volunteer Army from the Romanian Front.

Among those who came to the Don were public figures. One of the first to join the Alekseyev organization was Vasily Shulgin, who later became a member of the Special Meeting under Denikin. Boris Savinkov—the former head of the Socialist Revolutionary Combat Organization, who organized the Union for the Defense of the Motherland and Freedom under the Volunteer Army—was also there. Military leaders and Cossacks reacted extremely negatively to his presence.

=== People's Army ===
On 8 June 1918, the uprising White Czechs took Samara. On the same day, the People's Army was organized under the command of Colonel Nikolai Galkin. It was formed by the Committee of Members of the Constituent Assembly, which was repressed by the Bolsheviks in 1918. On 9 June, after the arrival of Lieutenant Colonel Vladimir Kappel in the army, the following were formed: 1st Volunteer Samara Squadron, Cavalry Squadron of Staff Captain Stafievsky, Volzhskaya Equestrian Battery of Captain Vyrypayev, horse reconnaissance, subversive command and economic unit. After the formation of the units, Kappel's troops occupy Syzran and Stavropol on 11 and 12 June, respectively.

On 10 July, the People's Army again entered Syzran, occupied by the Bolsheviks, and threw them back to Simbirsk. A few days later, Kappel's detachments occupied Simbirsk and from there they advanced in several directions: from Syzran to Volsk and Penza, from Simbirsk to Inza and Alatyr and along the banks of the Volga to the mouth of the Kama. After the capture of Kazan, the People's Army was reorganized. The Volga Front was created under the command of Stanislav Chechek. It was divided into several groups: Simbirsk, Kazan, Khvalynsk, Ufa, Nikolaev, Ural Cossack troops and the Orenburg Cossack troops.

Kappel suggested the command to take Nizhny Novgorod. He suggested that the occupation of the city would break the Bolshevik plans to sign additional agreements with the Kaiser of Germany in Berlin, as he would deprive them of money from the "pocket of Russia". However, the command and the Czechs abandoned these plans, citing a lack of reserves.

=== Siberian Army ===
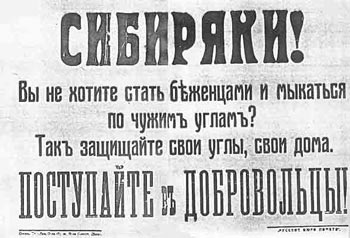
Appeal to volunteers, c. 1918–19

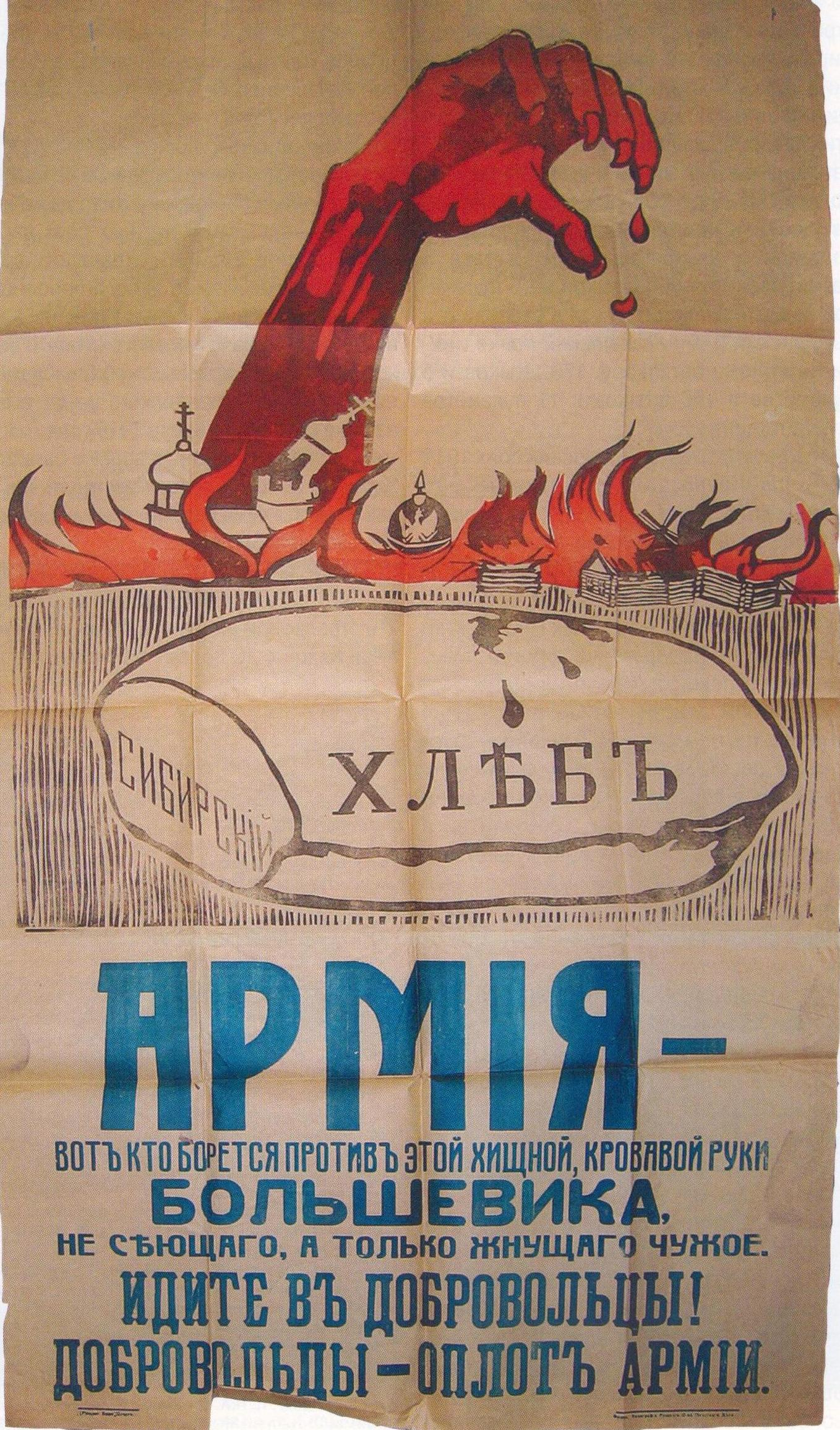
Anti–Bolshevik White Army poster encouraging people to enlist as volunteers

At the same time, in June 1918, the Provisional Siberian Government in Novo-Nikolaevsk created the Siberian Army. Initially, it was called the West Siberian Volunteer Army. From June to December 1918, the headquarters of the Siberian Army was the general headquarters for the entire White Movement of Siberia. In August the Supreme Administration of the Northern Region in Arkhangelsk created troops of the Northern Region, sometimes referred to as the Northern Army (not to be confused with General Rodzyanko's Northern Army).

In January 1919, the Don and Volunteer Armies were combined into the Armed Forces of the South of Russia. In June the Northern Army was created from Russian officers and soldiers of the Northern Corps, who left the Estonian army. A month later, the army was renamed the Northwest.

=== Unification in the Russian Army ===
On 14 October 1918, Minister of War Alexander Kolchak arrived in Omsk. On 18 November 1918 he was proclaimed the Supreme Ruler of Russia, who also assumed the supreme command of all the land and naval forces of Russia. He made a substantial reorganization of the forces of the White movement and carried out its integration into a single Russian Army on 23 September 1918. On 4 November Kolchak became part of the Russian Government.

As the Supreme Ruler of Russia, Kolchak was recognized by all the commanders of the White Armies both in the south and west of Russia, as well as in Siberia and the Far East; generals Denikin, Yevgeny Miller, Nikolai Yudenich voluntarily submitted to Kolchak and recognized his Supreme High Command over all armies in Russia. The supreme commander at the same time confirmed the authority of the commanders. From that moment, the Armed Forces of the South of Russia, the Northwestern Army, the Northern Army, and the Eastern Front began operating on the fronts as a single army.

The name "Russian Army" was approved as the union of all White fronts, the status of commanders of the fronts formally from the Supreme Commander-in-Chief was received by the commanders of the North and Northwest Armies Generals Yudenich and Miller. In April 1920, the Far Eastern Army was created in Transbaikalia from the remnants of the troops of the Eastern Front under the leadership of General Grigory Semenov. Out of the remnants of the Armed Forces of the South of Russia that left for Crimea in May 1920, General Wrangel formed the armed forces that inherited the name "Russian Army" from the single Russian army of Kolchak of 1919 – as the last of its fronts. In 1921, from the remnants of the Far Eastern Army of General Semyonov in Primorye, the White Rebel Army was formed, later renamed the Zemsky Army, since the Amur Zemsky Government was created in Vladivostok in 1922.

== Composition ==
White Armies drew both from volunteers and on the basis of mobilization. They drew from the population of controlled territories and from captured Red Army soldiers. On a voluntary basis, they were staffed not only from officers of the Imperial Russian Army and Navy, but also from all comers. It was both in the south – in the Volunteer Army, and in Siberia, for example – the division of the Labor Corps.

The strength of the White Armies fighting against the Red Army, according to intelligence estimates, by June 1919 was about 683,000. However, together with auxiliary and staff units, it could exceed 1,023,000 people. A significant part of the White forces was on contentment. Combat units amounted to only half of this figure. After that, the number of White Armies began to decline steadily.

The White Army consisted of all kinds of troops for that period:

- Air Units;
- Cavalry;
- Infantry;
- Railway connections.
- Tank Units;

All of them had their own uniforms and formation patch, often copied from the uniform of the guard units of the Imperial Russian Army. According to supporters of the White movement, the White Guard is a military man devoted to his ideals who was ready to defend his Motherland and his specific ideas about duty, honour, and justice with arms in hand.

== See also ==
- Russian All-Military Union
- Russian State (1918–1920)
- White Army, Black Baron
- Ranks and insignia of the White Movement
- Khabarovsk Campaign

== Sources ==
- Osipov, Yury (2005). White Armies. Moscow: Great Russian Encyclopedia. p. 268. ISBN 5-85270-331-1. Archived from the original on 11 July 2021.
- Valery Klaving (2003). Civil War in Russia: White Armies. Moscow, Saint Petersburg: AST, Terra Fantastica. p. 637. ISBN 5-17-019260-6.
- N. D. Egorov; N. V. Pulchenko; L. M. Chizhova, eds. (1998). White Army Funds Guide. Moscow: Russian Bibliographic Society. p. 526. ISBN 5-02-018037-8. Archived from the original on 7 March 2012 – via Russian State Military Archive.
- Werth, Nicolas; Bartosek, Karel; Panne, Jean-Louis; Margolin, Jean-Louis; Paczkowski, Andrzej; Courtois, Stephane (1999). Black Book of Communism: Crimes, Terror, Repression. Harvard University Press. ISBN 0-674-07608-7.
