= Northern Army (Russia) =

Russian Civil War

The Northern Army was a White Army that operated in the Northern Front of the Russian Civil War from November 1918 to February 1920.

== History ==
After the October Revolution, numerous counter-revolutionary governments formed to fight against the Bolsheviks. In August 1918, a leftist regime called the Supreme Administration of the Northern Region was formed in Arkhangelsk, led by the veteran Populist Nikolai Tchaikovsky. In January 1919, Tchaikovsky was replaced by Yevgeny Miller.

In the Northern Region, an Army was formed with support of the Allies. Major-General Vladimir Marushevsky became commander-in-chief of the White Northern Army. Due to the low influx of volunteers into the Army, the Supreme Administration of the Northern Region introduced general military service. Despite this, the strength of the troops grew rather slowly. In addition, the discipline of the Northern Army was very poor. By the summer of 1919, the Northern army numbered 25,000 men, of whom 14,000 were captured Red Army soldiers. In September 1919, the Northern Army launched an offensive on the Northern Front, during which land in the Komi Territory was seized.

By February 1920, the troops of the Northern region had 1,492 officers, 39,822 combatant and 13,456 non-combatant lower ranks, with a total complexity of 54,700 men with 161 guns and 1,600 machine guns. Despite this, after the Allies had withdrawn, the Northern Army quickly collapsed when the Red Army launched a counter-offensive in December 1919.

Many soldiers capitulated and the remnants of the Army were evacuated from Arkhangelsk in February 1920.

== Strength ==
- 3,000 (August 1918)
- 9,500 (January 1919)
- 25,000 (summer of 1919)
- 54,700 (February 1920)

== Commanders ==
- Vladimir Marushevsky (November 1918 - May 1919)
- Yevgeny Miller (May 1919 - February 1920)

=== Chief of staff ===
- Mikhail Kvetsinsky (January 1919 - February 1920).
