= Sergey Voytsekhovsky =

Russian and Czechoslovak general

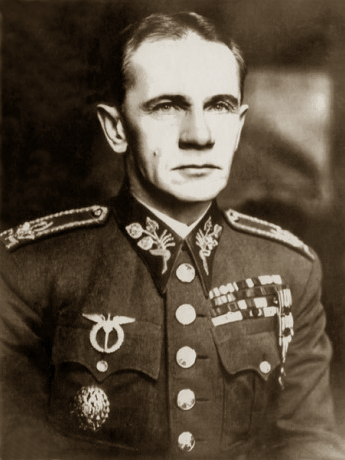
- Voytsekhovsky as Army General of the Czechoslovak Republic, 1938
- Born: 16 October 1883; Vitebsk, Vitebsk Governorate, Russian Empire
- Died: 7 April 1951 (aged 67) Irkutsk, Russian SFSR, Soviet Union
- Allegiance: Russia; Czechoslovakia
- Branch: Russian Army; White Army; Czechoslovak Army
- Service years: 1902–1939
- Rank: General (from 1917)
- Conflicts: World War I Russian Civil War
- Awards: Order of St. Stanislaus 2nd class Order of St. Anne 2nd class Order of St. George 4th class Order of St. Vladimir 4th class Order of the White Lion, 3rd class (1997); Commander of the Legion of Honor; Order of St. Sava; Czechoslovak War Cross 1918

Sergey Nikolayevich Voytsekhovsky (Russian: Сергей Николаевич Войцеховский; Czech: Sergej Nikolajevič Vojcechovský; 16 October 1883 – 7 April 1951) was a Russian military leader who was a colonel in the Imperial Russian Army, a major-general in the White Army, and a general in the Czechoslovak Army. He was a participant in the Great Siberian Ice March.

== Biography ==
=== Early life ===
Voytsekhovsky was born on 16 October 1883 in Vitebsk, into a noble family. He graduated from Technical High School in Velikiye Luki (1902), Constantine Artillery School. (Konstantinovskoye Artilleriiskoe Uchilishche), St. Petersburg (1904) and the Imperial Nicholas Military Academy (1912). After graduation, he served in the 2nd Artillery Brigade of the 20th Infantry.

=== Czechoslovak Service in Russia ===
From December 1917 he was Commanding Officer 3rd Rifle Regiment (of Jan Žižka z Trocnova) (took office in February 1918).

From May 1918 he was Senior military commander of the Czechoslovak Legion in the area of Chelyabinsk and was also a member of the Military Collegium of the Provisional Executive Committee of the Czecho-Slovak army in Russia: a body heading the Czechoslovak armed forces that opposed the Bolsheviks.

During the night of 26 to 27 May 1918, commanding the 2nd and 3rd Czechoslovak infantry regiments, he took Chelyabinsk with no losses. On 27 May 1918 he was appointed Commander of the army units of the Chelyabinsk and Ural front.

As a result of hostilities in May–June 1918 in Chelyabinsk he was joined by the troops of the Siberian Tatar group of Czechoslovak troops under the command of Czech general Radola Gajda.

On 11 June 1918 he was promoted, by decision of the Chelyabinsk branch of the Czechoslovak National Council, to the rank of colonel and was appointed to lead the Western Group of Forces (2nd and 3rd Czechoslovak Rifle Regiments and the Kurgan infantry battalion).

In June 1918 he took Troitsk and Zlatoust, then in July was sent to the Urals. After taking Yekaterinburg on 25 July he stayed in Yekaterinburg.

In August–September 1918 his group was expanded by groups from the 2nd Infantry Division and was then fighting in the area of Yekaterinburg, Nizhny Tagil, Kungur and Tyumen.

Colonel Voytsekhovsky personally led the battles to capture the Verkh-Neyvinsky plant, leading a group of Czechs. They moved along the east coast of Tavatuy Lake and took Nizhny Tagil.

On 17 October 1918 "for distinction in combat and distinguished service" he was promoted by the Czechoslovak National Council to major-general and appointed commander of the Samara group of troops of the Government Directorate.

He commanded defensive battles in the Volga region: not only did he stop the advance of the Red forces, but he threw them back across the Ik River, securing a firmer footing on the white Samara front. In an era of increasing contrasts between the command of the Czechoslovak army and the Supreme Ruler Aleksandr Kolchak he supported the latter.

=== Army General under Admiral Kolchak ===
On 8 March 1919 he returned to the Russian service (in the army of the Supreme ruler Kolchak) with the rank of major-general. He was appointed commander of the 2nd Ufa Corps, which headed part of the White Russian forces in the spring offensive of 1919, in the battles of Ufa, Zlatoust and Chelyabinsk. Major-general Voytsekhovsky was awarded the Order of St. George 4th degree in July 1919 for having captured Chelyabinsk, Troitsk, Chrysostom, and Yekaterinburg in 1918.

From August 1919 he was Commander of the Ufa group of troops. During the Tobolsk White offensive on 1 September 1919 despite the plight of his right flank, he completely fulfilled his task of flanking the 27th Red Infantry Division. Then he turned his force northwards during the battle and destroyed the enemy on the Siberian Army front, than let her go ahead, although it is early in the course of the failed counter-attack. During this period on 12 September 1919 Major-general Voytsekhovsky was awarded the Order of St. George in the 3rd degree.

From 1 October 1919 he was Commander of the 2nd Army. As a supporter of strict discipline he personally shot and killed, on 20 November 1919 in the village of Ust-Tarka, Major-General P. P. Grivin for unauthorized abandonment of his front that forced the retreat of Wojciechowski's southern group. Then the troops appointed a new commander and he ordered them to return to the abandoned position.

=== The Great Siberian Ice March ===
After the death of General Vladimir Kappel on 25 January 1920 during the Great Siberian Ice March, Major-General Voytsekhovsky succeeded him as Chief of the Eastern Front. He supervised the entrance of the White Army into Irkutsk and on 30 January 1920 destroyed the red troops in that area and on 1 February 1920 also took the suburb of Cherm. Later, he led his forces in fierce fighting near Irkutsk, where his army was weakened by an epidemic of typhus.

On 20 February 1920, General Grigory Semyonov appointed him commander of the Russian eastern regions. From 5 to 6 March 1920, he successfully withdrew his forces from the area around Krasnoyarsk. But by May 1920, Voytsekhovsky was seconded to the Crimea to establish a connection with the Armed Forces of South Russia, becoming the Army Reserve of General Wrangel. In November 1920, together with his troops he was evacuated to Istanbul, and then moved to Czechoslovakia.

=== Army General of the Czechoslovak Republic ===
On 1 May 1921 he was appointed to serve in the Czechoslovak army and served in different posts in the following years as follows:

- September 1921 – February 1922 Commander of the 24th infantry Brigade.
- February 1922 – 1924 Deputy Commander of the Subcarpathian Military Region in Uzhgorod
- 1924–1927 Commander of the 9th infantry division in Trnava
- 1927–1935 Head of the Land of the military district in Brno
- 1935–1938 Head of the Prague military district.

On 30 December 1929 was promoted to the rank of Army General.

In September and October 1938 he was in command of the 1st Czechoslovak Army. During the Munich crisis of 1938 he took an active anti-capitulatory position (at that time one of the advocates of surrender was General Jan Syrový) and for that in April 1939 he was discharged.

In 1939, after German occupation of Czechoslovakia, he created and headed an underground organization called Obrana národa ("Defence of the nation"). He was under surveillance by the Gestapo and was a member of the underground Czechoslovak government where he served as Minister of War.

=== Career ===
Division 1st Caucasian Corps

- (1904–1905) Inspector Training Division
- (1905–1907) Senior officer of the 3rd Battery
- (1907–1912) Inspector Training Division 5-Infantry Artillery Division in Białystok, adjutant commander of an artillery division.
- (1912–1913) Served in the 1st Grenadier Brigade, while he taught tactics at the Alexander Military School and graduated from flying school.
- (1913) (Apr-Oct) Served in the headquarters of the Moscow Military District.
- (1913–1914) Company commander in the 122nd Tambov Infantry Regiment of the 10th Army.

Participant in the First World War

- August 1914 – November 1915 Senior aide staff in the 69th Infantry Division,
- November 1915 – January 1917 Staff officer for assignments in the headquarters of 20 Corps.
- January 1917– December 1917 Chief of Staff, 126th Infantry Division.
- Since August 1917 Chief of Staff of the 1st Czechoslovak division in the Russian army (First Hussite Rifle Division).

Wounded and was awarded several medals in the fighting in the Carpathian Mountains and the Dnieper basin.

Promotions

- 1914 Captain
- 1916 Lieutenant Colonel

== Post-War fate ==
On 12 May 1945, despite being a Czechoslovak citizen, Voytsekhovsky was captured in Prague by a Soviet military counter-intelligence commando SMERSH and immediately abducted to Moscow. The warrant was only issued on 30 May 1945, two days after he was interned in Lefortovo prison. On 15 September 1945, he was sentenced in absentia to 10 years in prison for 'anti-Soviet activity'.

After the trial, Voytsekhovsky was moved to Butyrka prison, awaiting another transfer to Unzhlag GULAG camp. On 25 May 1949, he was transferred again, this time to a recently established special GULAG camp MVD Ozerlag for political prisoners in Irkutsk Oblast. Due to his advanced age, he was assigned a job of an orderly.

The post-war Czechoslovak government didn't take any action in relation to Wojciechowski's disappearance. On 17 September 1945, unaware of its general's whereabouts, the Czechoslovak Ministry of Foreign Affairs consulted the Ministries of Defense and Interior if the government should seek explanation and Wojciechowski's release from the Soviet authorities. The Ministry of Interior headed by the communist minister Václav Nosek declared such an intervention as 'undesirable'.

In 1949, after the communist putsch, the Czechoslovak communist government stripped Voytsekhovsky of his military rank and the communist propaganda labelled him as a counter-revolutionary.

Sergei Voytsekhovsky died in the Ozerlag camp on 7 April 1951, aged 67.

He was rehabilitated after the fall of the communist regime in Czechoslovakia. In 1997, he was awarded the Order of the White Lion in memoriam by Václav Havel, the then President of the Czech Republic. In 2004, a certificate dated 1996 of Wojciechowski's rehabilitation by the Russian Public Prosecutor's office was delivered to the Czech embassy in Moscow.

== Decorations ==
Awarded by Imperial Russia:

- Order of St. Stanislaus 3rd Class (1912, for the successful completion of Nicholas General Staff Academy).
- swords and bow to the Order of St. Stanislaus 3rd degree (1916).
- Order of St. Anne 4th Class "For Courage" (1915).
- Order of St. Anne 3rd Class with swords and bow (1915)
- Order of St. Stanislaus 2nd Class with Swords (1915).
- Order of St. Anne of 2nd Class with Swords (1915).
- Order of St. Vladimir 4th degree with swords and bow (1916).
- Order of St. Vladimir 3rd Class with Swords (1919)
- Order of St George 4th Class (1919).
- Order of St. George 3rd Class (1919).
- Order of the Great Siberian Ice March " 1st Class (№ 1, 1920).

Awarded by Czechoslovakia:

- Order of the Sokol (Řád sokola): with swords

Awarded by France:

- Légion d'honneur, in the grade of: Commandeur
- Légion d'honneur, in the grade of: Officier

Awarded by the Kingdom of Yugoslavia:

- The Order of St. Sava: I. class
- The Order of St. Sava: II. class
- The Order of The Yugoslav Crown: I. class

Awarded by Czech Republic:

- Order of the White Lion: III. class - in memoriam
