= Grigory Verzhbitsky =

Russian general (1875–1942)

Grigory Afanasyevich Verzhbitsky
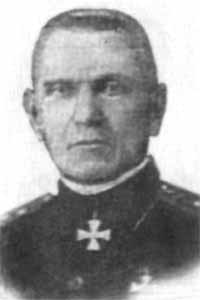
- Born: January 25, 1875; Letichev, Podolia Governorate, Russian Empire
- Died: December 20, 1942 (aged 67) Tianjin, China
- Allegiance: Russian Empire
- Branch: Russian Imperial Army, White Army
- Service years: 1897–1922
- Rank: Lieutenant-General
- Conflicts: Russo-Japanese War; World War I Russian Civil War
- Awards: Order of St. George (Third Degree), Order of St. Anna (2nd class), Order of Saint Stanislaus (Imperial House of Romanov) (3rd class), Order of St. Vladimir (4th class)

Grigory Afanasyevich Verzhbitsky (Russian: Григорий Афанасьевич Вержбицкий; 25 January 1875 — December 20, 1942) was one of the leaders of the White movement in Transbaikal and Primorye during the Russian Civil War.

Verzhbitsky graduated from the Odessa Infantry Engineering School in 1897. He fought in the Russo-Japanese War and World War I, rising to the rank of colonel in 1915. Verzhbitsky joined the Omsk Provisional Government of Admiral Kolchak and was appointed commander of the 3rd Steppe Siberian Corps, becoming Lieutenant general.

After the defeat of Admiral Kolchak's armies in the Ural and Western Siberia, Verzhbitsky took part in the Great Siberian Ice March. After arrival at Chita, Ataman Grigory Semyonov trusted into his hands the 2nd Separate Rifle Corps of the Far Eastern Army from February to August 23, 1920. Verzhbitsky escaped to China and even was a deputy of the Constituent Assembly of the Far Eastern Republic but did not participate in its work.

He headed the Provisional Priamurye Government Army of Spiridon Merkulov from 1921 to 1922. After the final defeat from the Soviets Verzhbitsky settled down in Harbin, heading the branch of the Russian All-Military Union. The Japanese sent him to Tianjin in 1934, where he died eight years later.

Verzhbitsky was awarded with:

- Order of St. George of the Fourth Degree
- Order of St. George of the Third Degree
- Order of St. Anna, 2nd class
- Order of St. Anna, 4th class
- Order of Saint Stanislaus (Imperial House of Romanov), 3rd class
- Order of St. Vladimir, 4th class
- Cross of St. George with a palm branch by his soldiers.
