= Great Siberian Ice March =

1919–20 White Army retreat during the Russian Civil War

- Part of the Eastern Front of the Russian Civil War
- Retreat of the White Army (Nov. 1919 - March 1920).
Date	14 November 1919 – March 1920
Location	East Central Siberia
Result	Red Army victory

Belligerents
Russian SFSR	Russian State

Commanders and leaders
(Russian Soviet Federative Socialist Republic) Sergey Kamenev (Russian Soviet Federative Socialist Republic) Vladimir Olderogge (Russian Soviet Federative Socialist Republic) Genrich Eiche	(Russian State) Alexander Kolchak (executed) (Russian State) Vladimir Kappel † (Russian State) Nikolai Lokhvitsky; Sergey Voytsekhovsky

The Great Siberian Ice March (Russian: Великий Сибирский Ледяной поход, romanized: Velikiy Sibirskiy Ledyanoy pokhod) was the name given to the 2,000-kilometre (1,200-mile) winter retreat of Admiral Alexander Kolchak's Siberian Army from Omsk to Chita between 14 November 1919 and March 1920, during the Russian Civil War.

General Vladimir Kappel, who was appointed to that position in mid-December 1919, led the retreat. After his death from pneumonia on 26 January 1920, General Sergey Voytsekhovsky took command of the troops. Kolchak travelled ahead by train to Irkutsk but was halted by Czechoslovak troops in December and handed over to Left Socialist-Revolutionary troops in Irkutsk on 14 January, who executed him on 7 February 1920.

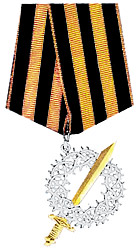
Order of the Great Siberian Ice March

== Prelude ==
In the summer of 1919, the Red Army had gained a great victory against Kolchak's army. The White Army forces re-established a line along the Tobol and the Ishim rivers to temporarily halt the Red Army, which was faced by an advance on Moscow from the south by Anton Denikin's Armed Forces of South Russia.

By the autumn, Denikin had been defeated, and the Red Army was able to direct reinforcements back to the Eastern Front. The Red Army broke through on the Tobol River in mid-October. and by November, the White forces were falling back towards Omsk in a disorganised mass. Omsk was conquered by the Reds on 14 November 1919.

== Retreat from Omsk to Lake Baikal ==
The retreat began after the heavy defeats of the White Army in the Omsk and the Novonikolaevsk operations in November to December 1919. The army, led by General Vladimir Kappel, retreated along the Trans-Siberian Railway using available trains to transport the wounded. They were followed by the 5th Red Army, under the command of Genrich Eiche.

The White retreat faced insurgencies in cities through which they passed, attacks by partisan detachments, and the fierce Siberian frost. After a series of defeats the White troops were demoralized, their supplies limited, and their discipline unstable.

Under these circumstances, Kappel was appointed commander of the Army because he enjoyed great trust and prestige amongst Kolchak's troops. The appointment was made to avoid the disintegration of the entire Kolchak army. Only the 2nd Army came under Kappel's command, as communication with the 1st and 3rd Armies had been lost. Control of the railway was in the hands of the Czechoslovak Legion therefore Kappel's army was unable to use the railway. The army was also harassed by partisan troops under the command of Alexander Diomidovich Kravchenko and Pyotr Efimovich Shchetinkin.

The pursuing Red 5th Army took Tomsk on 20 December 1919 and Krasnoyarsk on 7 January 1920.

== March across Lake Baikal ==
Kappel's 2nd Army came to a halt on the shore of Lake Baikal near Irkutsk in January 1920. With the Red Army in hot pursuit after Kappel was forced to find a route around the communist uprising in Krasnoyarsk, the 2nd White Army had to escape eastwards to Chita, across the frozen Lake Baikal in sub-zero temperatures. About 30,000 White Army soldiers, their families and all their possessions, as well as the Tsar's gold, made their way across the lake to Transbaikalia.

The bloodiest campaign battles occurred at the villages of Yakovlevka, Birulka, and Gruznovskaya, as well as at the city of Barguzin.

As the Arctic winds blew unobstructed across the lake, many in the army and their families froze to death. Their bodies remained frozen on the lake in a kind of tableau throughout the winter of 1919–1920. With the advent of spring, the frozen corpses and all their possessions disappeared under 5,000 feet of water. Kappel himself suffered frostbite and pneumonia in temperatures of -40 °C (-40 °F) and died on 26 January.

== End ==
The survivors of the march found a safe haven in Chita, the capital of Eastern Okraina, a territory under control of Kolchak's successor Grigory Mikhaylovich Semyonov, who was supported by a significant Japanese military presence.

The Central Committee of the Russian Communist Party issued an order not to advance beyond Irkutsk to avoid a military conflict with Japan since the main threat for the young Bolshevik state was Poland, in Europe.

== See also ==
- Bibliography of the Russian Revolution and Civil War
- Outline of the Russian Revolution and Civil War
- Index of articles related to the Russian Revolution and Civil War
- The "Russian" Civil Wars, 1916–1926: Ten Years That Shook the World
- Russia in Flames: War, Revolution, Civil War, 1914–1921
- Russia in Revolution: An Empire in Crisis, 1890 to 1928
- Russia: Revolution and Civil War, 1917—1921
- The Russian Revolution: A New History
