= Chita Operations =

Russian Civil War military engagements

- Part of the Eastern Front of the Russian Civil War
- The Chita White Cossack Regiment.
Date	10 April – 31 October 1920
Location	East Transbaikal
Result	Far Eastern Republic victory

Belligerents
Far Eastern Republic: People's Revolutionary Army	(Russian Empire) Eastern Okraina: Far Eastern Army; Japan

Commanders and leaders
(Far Eastern Republic) Genrich Eiche	(Russian Empire) Grigory Semyonov (Empire of Japan) Yui Mitsue

Strength
(Far Eastern Republic) 17,600 soldiers 107 machine guns 31 artillery pieces 4 armored trains 4 tanks	(Russian Empire) 14,600 soldiers 369 machine guns 100 artillery pieces 18 armored trains

The Chita Operations (Russian: Читинские Операции) were a series of military engagements fought in the Russian Civil War. On 10 April 1920, the army of the Far Eastern Republic (FER) launched the first operation, aiming at destroying the White Movement's Chita holdup in east Transbaikal which prevented it from connecting with its allies in Primorsky Krai. The first operation ended three days later, a second offensive (25 April–5 May) likewise failed to achieve its final objectives. Fighting continued, however neither side could boast significant territorial gains. On 15 July, the FER signed the Gongota Agreement of 1920 with Japan, the latter's withdrawal from Transbaikal severely weakened the Whites. The FER army was restructured and reinforced by its new commander Genrich Eiche, while morale under Grigory Semyonov's White units plummeted. On 1 October, Eiche launched the final Chita operation, by the end of the month the area of the Chita holdup had been subjugated.

== Background ==
In late 1919, the Bolsheviks began gaining the upper hand in the Russian Civil War. Alexander Kolchak's White Movement and its allies faced an upsurge of partisan activity, as the Bolsheviks initiated a large scale offensive on the Eastern Front. A coalition of Bolsheviks, Mensheviks and Left SRs formed a united political center in order to coordinate their actions against the Whites. The Red partisans took over Krasnoyarsk and Irkutsk on 24 December 1919 and 5 January 1920 respectively. On 4 January, Kolchak resigned, relegating the leadership of the White Movement to Anton Denikin and Grigory Semyonov.
On 6 April, the united leftist opposition formed the Far Eastern Republic as a semi autonomous buffer state between the Bolshevik dominated Russian Soviet Federative Socialist Republic and the rest of the Russian Far East still controlled by the White Movement and Japanese interventionists. On paper the Far Eastern Republic incorporated the Kamchatka Oblast, Zabaykalsky Krai, Primorsky Krai, Sakhalin Oblast, Amur Oblast and the Chinese Eastern Railway. However the eastern portion of Zabaykalsky Krai was still under the control of forces loyal to ataman Semyonov, forming the so-called Chita Holdup. The holdup thus prevented the Reds from connecting the Far East Republic with the Primorsky Krai.

In February 1920, Red partisans freed 700 leftist political prisoners in Blagoveshchensk, several thousand White prisoners of war volunteered to join their erstwhile adversaries. Four infantry regiments, one engineer battalion, one cavalry regiment and an artillery unit were formed out of the approximately 10,000 Red Amur partisans most of whom had little to no experience in combat. In early March, the aforementioned formations were dispatched to Transbaikal. On 12 March, fighting around Sretensk rekindled with new intensity.

== Operations ==
Semyonov's Eastern Okraina territory

=== First offensive (10-13 April 1920) ===
On 5 April, White major general Sergei Wojciechowski launched an offensive on the Sretensk–Nerchinsk–Olovyannaya axis. On 10 April 1920, the Far East Republic (FER) army launched its first Chita operation. The right column under Vasily Burov (2 regiments and 5 artillery pieces) advanced through the Yablonoi Mountains after seizing Beklemishev. Its advance was halted at the Domno Kliuchevsky rail road station, where it encountered determined resistance from Japanese army units and tanks. The middle column, consisting of five guns and the elements of the 10th and 11th Irkutsk Regiments, approached the Zastrel village from the direction of river Mongoy. It overtook the village, yet it similarly failed to move past its first objective. The left column (7 battalions and 4 light artillery pieces) emerged from the Yablonoi range at the Podvolochny village. It progressed through the Chitinka river valley, capturing the Shishkino, Popovo, Verch Chita, Smolenka villages, before being stopped just outside Kashtak. Shortages in ammunition, cavalry and training in conjunction with poor communication between the FER's units contributed to the termination of the offensive three days later. On 12 April, Wojciechowski attempted to encircle the Red partisans around Kopun. A day later the Reds broke out at Kuprikovo Shelopugino and the Zhidka hamlet, dispersing two enemy divisions. A parallel White push along the railroad line was repulsed. On 20 April, the Reds merged the West Amur and East Transbaikal fronts into the East Transbaikal Front, the 1st Transbaikal Corps was formed out of various partisan units.

=== Second offensive (25 April - 5 May 1920) ===
The Chita offensive was resumed on 25 April, once again it took a three pronged form. The 1st Brigade of the 2nd Irkutsk Division attacked from the railroad tracks from the west, the 2nd Brigade marched along the old Chita road, while a third column targeted the Chita river valley. On 26 April, the front stabilized at the Siviakovo–Amolovo–Ingoda–Pritupovo–Verch Chita–Shishkino–Podvolochnaya line. ensued, The FER army managed to break through to the banks of the Chernovka river after sanguine clashes. On 3 May, a White counterattack supported by tanks created a gap between the 1st and 2nd Irkutsk Divisions. Panic ensued and the Reds were forced to employ barrier troops to restore order. On 9 May, the Reds fell back to the Nikolayevskoye–Vershin Kondinskoe–Romanovka line.

=== Reorganization of the Red forces ===
On 10 May, Genrich Eiche was appointed as the new commander in chief of FER's armed forces, receiving a 30,000 man Amur army at his disposal. Eiche completely reorganized the army, liquidating partisan bands and merging depleted units. On 24 May, the FER and Japan initiated ceasefire talks at the Gongota railway station. The Japanese wished to gain a temporary reprieve west of Chita, while continuing operations in east Transbaikal. The negotiations came to a dead end in early June as the FER demanded an immediate cessation of hostilities and a complete Japanese withdrawal from Transbaikal. On 7 July, the Whites occupied the Gazimurovsk and Nerchinsk factories. The Reds used the opportunity and took Kadaya, Zulza, Noviy Orlov and Stariy Orlov villages, posing a direct threat to Nerchinsk. The FER–Japanese talks resumed on 10 July, five days later the Gongota Agreement of 1920 was signed. The agreed Japanese withdrawal from Transbaikal would deprive the Whites from much needed support.

On 26 July, the third FER army congress was held at the village of Pokrovka. The destruction of the Chita Holdup was set as the army's main target. At the same time FER agents made their way into Chita and came into contact with local partisans. A special partisan unit under B. M. Namokonov entered towns abandoned by the Japanese, setting up revolutionary councils in anticipation of the upcoming FER offensive. Sretensk, Nerchinsk and the Zubarevo railway station were captured on 5, 7 and 9 August respectively. By the middle of the month the partisans had reached the Urulga station, having previously handed over their positions to the FER in order to avoid resuming hostilities with the Japanese. On 10 September, Red partisans penetrated the Ingoda River valley and the area south west of Chita still held by the Whites. Semyonov's influenced began to wane leading to the desertion of the 1st Tatar Cavalry Regiment to the FER. Nevertheless, White forces in the region amounted to 14,600 soldiers, 369 machine guns, 100 artillery pieces and 18 armored trains. The FER's forces committed to the Chita operation numbered over 17,600 soldiers, 107 machine guns, 31 artillery pieces, 4 armored trains and 4 tanks. On 16 September, Eiche outlined the Karymskoye railway station as the focal point of future offensive operations.

=== Third offensive (1-31 October 1920) ===
On 1 October, the FER launched its third Chita operation. The first column, consisting of the 2nd Amur Division, 2nd Cavalry Brigade, partisan units, an armored train and a tank platoon under V. A. Popov, assaulted Zubarevo and Razmachino. The 1st Infantry Brigade of I. E. Fadeev targeted the Ust Haramibir and Dzhidinskii villages in the center. On the left flank the Zabaikalsk Cavalry Division of N. Korotaev struck the Borzia, Haranor, Olovianaia railway stations. The rest of the FER army remained in the reserve. On 15 October, the last Japanese units withdrew from Transbaikal setting the FER Amur Front in motion four days later. On 20 October, the Reds occupied Karymskoye isolating the Chita garrison from the Manchuria railway system. On 22 October, the 8th FER Cavalry Regiment executed a rapid maneuver towards the Verchnechitinsky village. Having defeated its defenders, it entered Chita. The left flank of the Whites situated between Adrianovka and Dauria fled to Manchuria. The Chita holdup had been terminated, 4 White divisions stationed at Olovyannaya held their ground until 29 October.

== Aftermath ==
Operations in Transbaikal continued through November. On 13 November, Hadabulak fell to the hands of the FER, a subsequent three day battle led to the capitulation of Borzya. On the night of 18 November, the FER overtook Dauria. By the end of the month 16 armored trains, 10 airplanes, 100 artillery pieces and 150 machine guns were seized, a 35,000 man White movement contingent had been annihilated. The defeat of the White movement in Transbaikal forced the Japanese to speed up their evacuation from Khabarovsk, putting an end to White resistance in the Russian Far East.

== See also ==
- Bibliography of the Russian Revolution and Civil War
- Outline of the Russian Revolution and Civil War
- Index of articles related to the Russian Revolution and Civil War
- The "Russian" Civil Wars, 1916–1926: Ten Years That Shook the World
- Russia in Flames: War, Revolution, Civil War, 1914–1921
- Russia in Revolution: An Empire in Crisis, 1890 to 1928
- Russia: Revolution and Civil War, 1917—1921
- The Russian Revolution: A New History
