= Sergey Taskin =

Russian political figure

Sergey Afanasyevich Taskin
- Серге́й Афана́сьевич Та́скин
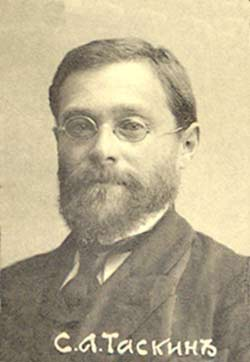
- Sergey Taskin, circa 1907

Personal details
- Born: September 7, 1876 Stanitsa Manchzhurskaya, Trans-Baikal Region
- Died: July 7, 1952 (aged 75) Harbin
- Party: Constitutional Democratic Party
- Occupation: Deputy of the State Duma of the Second and Fourth Convocations, the Constituent Assembly, the head of the "Government of the Russian Eastern Outskirts"

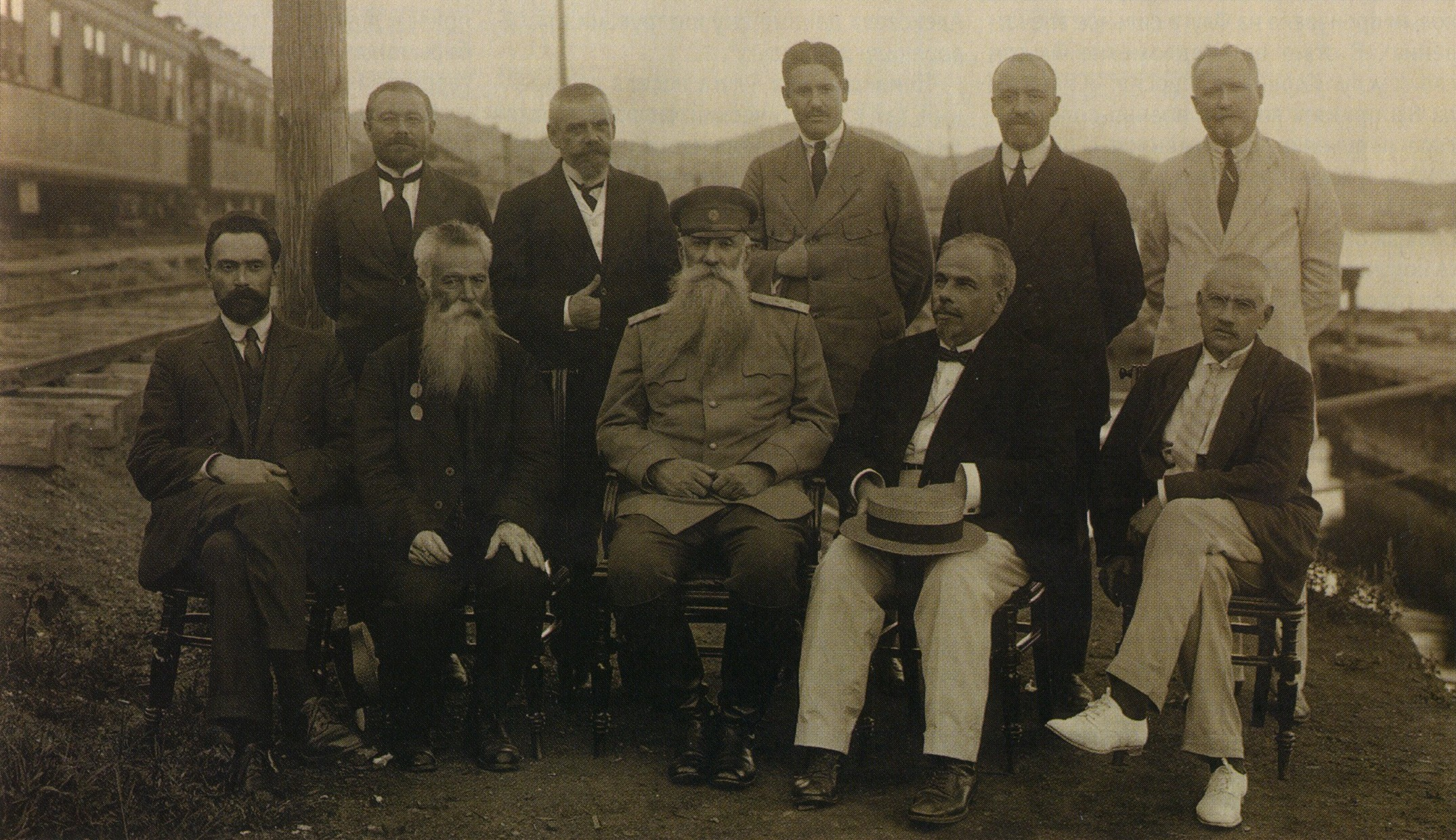
Government (business office) of General Dmitry Horvat. Vladivostok, 1918. Sitting: Leonid Ustrugov, Mikhail Kursky, Dmitry Horvat, Stepan Vostrotin, Vasily Flug. Standing: Sergey Taskin, Vasily Alferev, Alexander Okorokov, Vladimir Glukharyov, Professor Jacob Brandt

Sergey Afanasyevich Taskin (Russian: Серге́й Афана́сьевич Та́скин; September 7, 1876, in Stanitsa Manchzhurskaya, Trans-Baikal Region – July 7, 1952, in Harbin) was a Russian political figure of the first quarter of the 20th century, a constitutional democrat. He was a leading member of the White movement.

== Biography ==
Sergey Taskin came from the Cossacks of the Transbaikal army. He graduated from the Alexandrovsky Zavod two-year college, then the Chita men's gymnasium. In 1896 he entered the natural department of the Faculty of Mathematics and Physics of Saint Petersburg University.

During his studies, in 1902, he was elected chairman of the first organized council of headmen, a student self-governing body. For organizing a student gathering in February of the same year, he was arrested and sent to Siberia in Nerchinsk for three years under police supervision. In Siberia, Sergey Taskin worked as a teacher of natural sciences at the Nerchinsk Real School and was engaged in agriculture, was in the local organization of the Cadet Party.

In 1907 he was elected a deputy of the State Duma of the 2nd convocation from the Trans-Baikal Cossack army. He was a member of the cadet faction and participated in the work of the commission on public education. After the dissolution of the Duma, he returned to Transbaikalia, where he again worked as a teacher of natural sciences at the Nerchinsk Real School. In 1907, he was twice arrested by the police, but both times he was released for lack of evidence. By order of the Irkutsk Governor-General, he was sent to reside in the village of Kazachinskoye, Kirensk district, Irkutsk province. In 1908, after the expiration of the exile, he returned to his homeland and was engaged in agriculture. In 1912 he was elected a deputy of the State Duma of the 4th convocation from the Trans-Baikal Cossack Army. He was a member of the cadet faction, the Siberian and Cossack parliamentary groups, was a member of 3 commissions.

During the First World War, together with Viktor Pepelyaev led the West Siberian sanitary squad.

After the February Revolution as Commissioner of the Provisional Committee of the State Duma, together with Viktor Pepelyaev, he prevented the plundering of weapons from the Petrograd arsenal and was engaged in normalizing the situation in Kronstadt. In August 1917, he chaired the 2nd Regional Congress of the Transbaikal Cossacks and at the end of October was elected to the All-Russian Constituent Assembly from the Trans-Baikal Region.

He took an active part in the fight against Soviet power. In April 1918, he became part of the Provisional Government of the Trans-Baikal Region created by ataman Grigory Semenov, taking over the organization of civilian administration in the territory freed from the Bolsheviks. By the decree of the Supreme Ruler of Russia Alexander Kolchak in November 1918, Taskin was appointed manager of the Trans-Baikal region.

Guided by the latest decree of Alexander Kolchak, Ataman Grigory Semyonov announced on January 16, 1920 in Chita the creation of the Government of the Russian Eastern Okraina, headed by Sergey Taskin, who also became an assistant to the commander-in-chief of the Russian Eastern outskirts in the civilian part (later this post was occupied by Volgin).

On July 17, 1920, the Gongota Agreement was concluded between representatives of the Far Eastern Republic and the command of the Japanese troops. July 25, 1920 began the evacuation of Japanese troops from Transbaikalia, ending October 15. Whites understood the impossibility, after the evacuation of the Japanese, to retain the territory they had previously occupied with their own forces, and decided to evacuate the troops and institutions to the south, to the Manchurian border. On August 16, the government moved from Chita to Borzya. In late October, Chita was taken by the red troops, and Borzya in the middle of November. The Whites went to Manchuria, where they were disarmed by the Chinese militarists who controlled this country.

Sergey Taskin remained in exile in Manchuria. And under the Chinese government, and in the era of Manchukuo, he was engaged in teaching and was the director of the secondary school at Zharomte station on the western line of the Chinese Eastern Railway. He died in Harbin, in 1952, during the period of the People's Republic of China.

== Sources ==
- Pavel Novikov. The civil war in Eastern Siberia. – Moscow: Centrpoligraph CJSC, 2005. ISBN 5-9524-1400-1
- Peter Vologodsky. In power and in exile: the diary of the Prime Minister of anti-Bolshevik governments and the émigré in China (1918–1925). Ryazan, 2006.
- Sergey Zvyagin. Sergey Taskin, head of the Trans-Baikal Region (1918–1920) // Problems of the History of Siberia (18th – 20th centuries): Interuniversity collection of scientific papers (to the 75th anniversary of Professor Boris Batuev). Ulan-Ude, 2000.
