= Kalinino, Zabaykalsky Krai =

Kalinino Калинино
- Selo
- Location within Zabaykalsky Krai Location within Russia
- Coordinates: 51°54′N 116°39′E
- Country: Russia
- Region: Zabaykalsky Krai
- District: Nerchinsky District
- Time zone: UTC+9:00

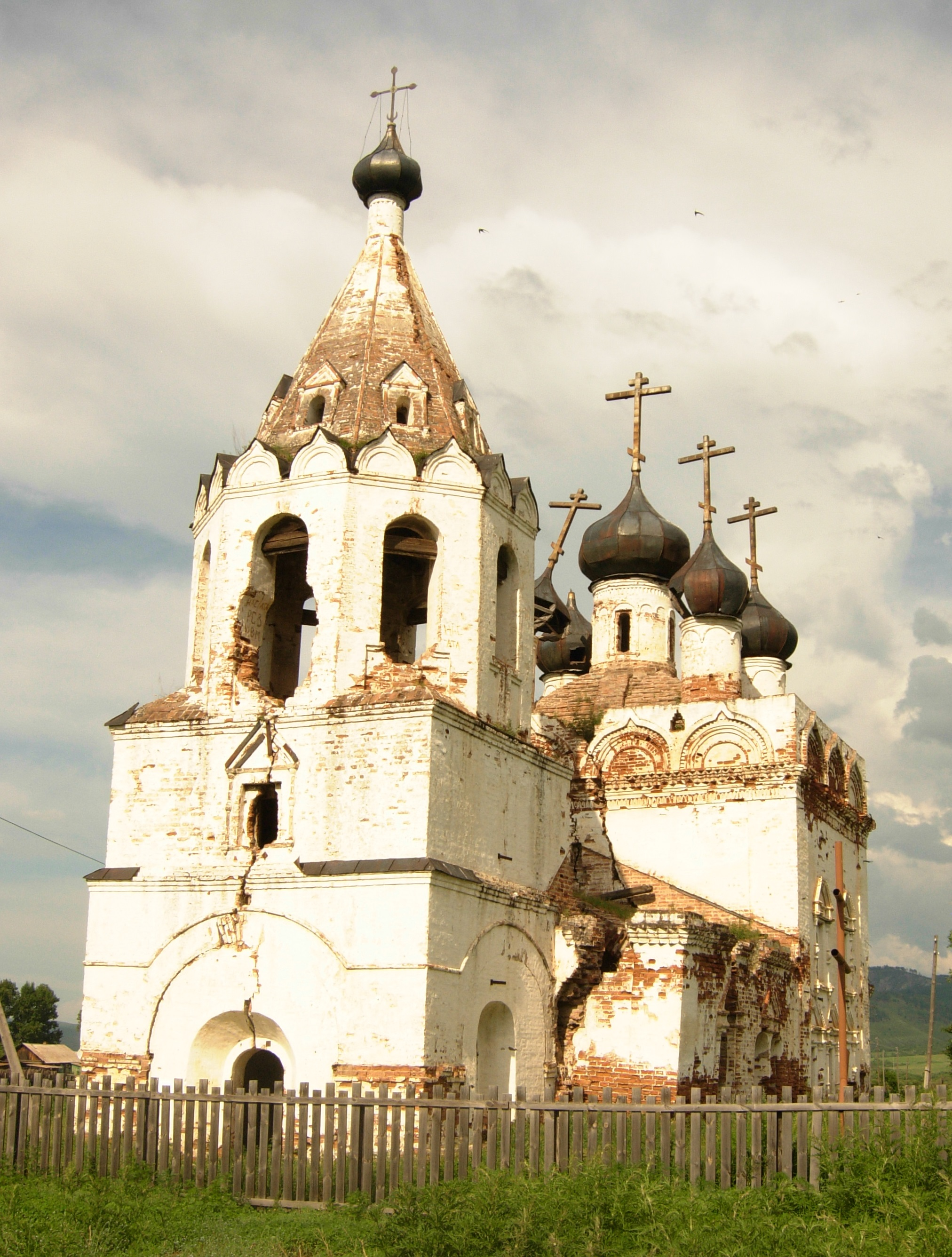
Uspenskaya Church in Kalinino

Kalinino (Russian: Калинино) is a rural locality (a selo) in Nerchinsky District, Zabaykalsky Krai, Russia. Population: 413 (2021 census); 463 (2010 census); 458 (2002 census); There are 7 streets in this selo.

== Geography ==
This rural locality is located 9 km from Nerchinsk (the district's administrative centre), 217 km from Chita (capital of Zabaykalsky Krai) and 5,440 km from Moscow. Priisovy is the nearest rural locality.
