= People's Revolutionary Army of the Far Eastern Republic =

Russian Civil War army

- Народно-революционная армия Дальневосточной республики
- Emblem of the PRA FER
- Founded: March 1920
- Disbanded: November 22 1922
- Service branches: People's Revolutionary Fleet

Leadership
- Minister of Defence: Vasily Blyukher

Personnel
- Active personnel: 15,000 (1920); 47,440 (1922)

The People's Revolutionary Army of the Far Eastern Republic (PRA FER) (Russian: Наро́дно-революцио́нная а́рмия Дальневосто́чной респу́блики (НРА ДВР)) was the military of the Far Eastern Republic, a buffer state established by the Russian Soviet Federative Socialist Republic during the Russian Civil War. Its military was formed in March of 1920 from units of the East Siberian Soviet Army. Its Commander-in-Chief was appointed by the leadership of the RSFSR, and was subject to the directives of the Revolutionary Military Council.

== History ==
Commander of a PRA rifle regiment alongside a political commissar

=== Formation ===
The People's Revoluationary Army originated with the Political Center of Irkutsk. In December 1919, an army of the same name led by Socialist Revolutionary Nikolai Sergeevich Kalashnikov led a successful rebellion against the forces of Alexander Kolchak. By January 21 1920, a coup by Bolsheviks and Left SR members in Irkutsk deposed the Political Center. Control of the PRA would be ceded to the Bolsheviks, which would rename it to the East Siberian Soviet Army.

On March 18 1920, its name would revert back to the People's Revolutionary Army. Its numbers would be bolstered by Soviet reinforcenments and it would fall under the command of Red Army commander Genrich Eiche. This consolidation of Bolshevik control over the PRA prompted Kalashnikov's resignation and protests from local SR and Menshevik representatives. The PRA would not be subordinate to the FER's government, and would function as a de facto formation of the Red Army for the remainder of its existence.

In contrast to ataman Grigory Semyonov's White forces, the PRA exempted local Buryats from conscription and requested volunteers instead. Though Buryats were expected to contribute horses and supplies to the PRA.

=== Chita Operations ===
From April to May 1920, the PRA tried and failed to assert its control over Transbaikal twice. By fall of 1920, diplomacy between the FER and Japan resulted in the withdrawal of Japanese troops from the Transbaikal. The Chita Operations resulted in the defeat of Semyonov's army. Clearing the way for the PRA to occupy Chita on October 22 1920. By the beginning of November, the Trainsbaikal region had been fully annexed to the Far Eastern Republic. The Far Eastern Army retreated to Primorye, while Japanese forces retreated to Khabarovsk.

=== Free City incident ===
Tension existed between Korean independence movement militants and Korean members of the PRA over subordination to the Red Army. This created a rift between the Irkutsk and Shanghai factions of the Korean Communist Party These culminated on June 28 1921 in the Free City incident. Resistance against disarmament by the PRA resulted in the deaths of 118 to 400 Korean militants. Vasily Blyukher, then commander of the PRA, laid blame for the incident with the Korean guerillas. Accusing them of violence against the local population, as had occurred in the Nikolayevsk incident.

=== Battles for Mongolia and Volochayevka ===
From May to August 1921, troops of the PRA fought alongside the 5th Army and Mongolian People's Army against Roman von Ungern-Sternberg's military. After repelling attacks from Sternberg's White forces, a Red counteroffensive was launched in July. By August, Urga was under Soviet occupation, and the rest of Mongolia followed. Securing the southern flank of the Far Eastern Republic and allowing for the establishment of a provisional Soviet government in Mongolia.

On May 26 1921, a Japanese-backed coup in Vladivostok resulted in the establishment of the Provisional Priamurye Government. Negotiations between the FER yielded no results. In November, White troops advanced north, and occupied Khabarovsk by December 22. The White army advanced westward before halting their advance at the train station in Volochayevka, fortifying their defenses there. On February 5 1922, PRA units commanded by Blyukher launched an offensive against the White Army which would later be known as the Battle of Volochayevka. White forticiations were reached on February 10. For three days and under deep snow cover, the PRA offensive continued until the White lines were broken on February 12. By February 14, the PRA occupied Khabarovsk.

=== Taking of Vladivostok ===
PRA troops marching through Vladivostok on October 25 1922

On October 4 1922, the PRA repelled an offensive by the Zemskaya Rat's army, led by White general Mikhail Diterikhs. A counteroffensive followed, resulting in the taking of Spassk-Dalny. Alongside partisan troops, the PRA defeated White forces on the approach to Nikolsk by October 14. Five days later, the PRA reached Vladivostok, which still contained about 20,000 Japanese troops. On October 24, an agreement was reached for these troops to withdraw from the Russian Far East. (Note: With the exception of northern Sakhalin, which would remain under Japanese occupation until 1925.) The following day saw the entry of the PRA into Vladivostok and the withdrawal of the remaining White movement forces.

On November 22 1922, the Far Eastern Republic was integrated into the RFSFR. The PRA would be integrated into the 5th Army of the Red Army, and given the name "Pacific Red Banner."

== Commanders ==
Commander-in-Chief
#	Name	Portrait	Start	End
1	Genrich Eiche		March 17 1920	January 21 1921
Acting	Sergey Pavlov		January 21 1921	February 21 1921
1	Genrich Eiche		February 21 1921	April 29 1921
2	Vasili Burov-Petrov		April 30 1921	May 3 1921
Acting	Albert Lapin		May 4 1921	June 25 1921
3	Vasily Blyukher		June 26 1921	July 14 1922
4	Konstantin Avksentevsky		July 15 1922	August 16 1922
5	Ieronim Uborevich		August 16 1922	November 22 1922

Defense Chief of Staff
#	Name	Portrait	Start	End
1	Pyotr Pelyenkin		March 18 1920	June 29 1921
2	Vyacheslav Tokarevskiy		June 30 1921	May 3 1922
3	Boris Feldman		May 4 1922	July 4 1922
4	Aleksandr Shuvayev		July 4 1922	August 21 1922
5	Ivan Smorodinov		August 22 1922	November 22 1922

Minister of War
#	Name	Portrait	Start	End
1	Vasily Blyukher		June 27 1921	July 1922

== Ranks and insignia ==
The uniforms and insignia of the PRA were initially no different from the Red Army's. The following insignia and rankings were adopted on November 30 1920.

#	1	2	3	4	5	6
Sleeve patch						
Ranking	Soldier	Separate Commander	Assistant platoon commander	Company sergeant major	Platoon commander, Assistant company commander	Company commander
№	7	8	9	10	11	12
Нарукавная нашивка						
Воинская должность	Separate Company Commander, Battalion commander, Assistant Regiment Commander	Separate Battalion Commander, Regiment Commander	Brigade commander	Chief of division, Chief of staff	Commander of the army	Commander-in-chief

== See also ==
- Far Eastern Republic
- Siberian Army
- Far Eastern Army
