= Zyulzya =

Zyulzya Зюльзя
- Selo
- Location within Zabaykalsky Krai Location within Russia
- Coordinates: 52°31′N 116°12′E
- Country: Russia
- Region: Zabaykalsky Krai
- District: Nerchinsky District
- Time zone: UTC+9:00

Zyulzya (Russian: Зюльзя) is a rural locality (a selo) in Nerchinsky District, Zabaykalsky Krai, Russia. Population: 1,416 (2021 census); 1,600 (2010 census); 1,801 (2002 census); There are 21 streets in this selo.

== Geography ==
This rural locality is located 68 km from Nerchinsk (the district's administrative centre), 191 km from Chita (capital of Zabaykalsky Krai) and 5,328 km from Moscow. Krupyanka is the nearest rural locality.
