= Nizhniye Klyuchi =

Nizhniye Klyuchi Нижние Ключи
- Selo
- Location within Zabaykalsky Krai Location within Russia
- Coordinates: 51°59′N 116°49′E
- Country: Russia
- Region: Zabaykalsky Krai
- District: Nerchinsky District
- Time zone: UTC+9:00

Nizhniye Klyuchi (Russian: Нижние Ключи) is a rural locality (a selo) in Nerchinsky District, Zabaykalsky Krai, Russia. Population: 421 (2021 census); 498 (2010 census); 590 (2002 census); There are 9 streets in this selo.

== Geography ==
This rural locality is located 16 km from Nerchinsk (the district's administrative centre), 227 km from Chita (capital of Zabaykalsky Krai) and 5,439 km from Moscow. Borshchovka is the nearest rural locality.
