= Bolshoy Lug, Zabaykalsky Krai =

Bolshoy Lug Большой Луг
- Selo
- Location within Zabaykalsky Krai Location within Russia
- Coordinates: 52°25′N 116°12′E
- Country: Russia
- Region: Zabaykalsky Krai
- District: Nerchinsky District
- Time zone: UTC+9:00

Bolshoy Lug (Russian: Большой Луг) is a rural locality (a selo) in Nerchinsky District, Zabaykalsky Krai, Russia. Population: 71 (2021 census); 72 (2010 census); 57 (2002 census); There is 1 street in this selo.

== Geography ==
This rural locality is located 56 km from Nerchinsk (the district's administrative centre), 188 km from Chita (capital of Zabaykalsky Krai) and 5,342 km from Moscow. Olinsk is the nearest rural locality.
