= Olekan =

Olekan Олекан
- Selo
- Location within Zabaykalsky Krai Location within Russia
- Coordinates: 52°22′N 116°03′E
- Country: Russia
- Region: Zabaykalsky Krai
- District: Nerchinsky District
- Time zone: UTC+9:00

Olekan (Russian: Олекан) is a rural locality (a selo) in Nerchinsky District, Zabaykalsky Krai, Russia. Population: 725 (2021 census); 884 (2010 census); 951 (2002 census); There are 11 streets in this selo.

== Geography ==
This rural locality is located 56 km from Nerchinsk (the district's administrative centre), 178 km from Chita (capital of Zabaykalsky Krai) and 5,340 km from Moscow. Olinsk is the nearest rural locality.
