= Shivki =

Shivki Шивки
- Selo
- Location within Zabaykalsky Krai Location within Russia
- Coordinates: 51°55′N 116°42′E
- Country: Russia
- Region: Zabaykalsky Krai
- District: Nerchinsky District
- Time zone: UTC+9:00

Shivki (Russian: Шивки) is a rural locality (a selo) in Nerchinsky District, Zabaykalsky Krai, Russia. Population: 170 (2021 census); 168 (2010 census); 176 (2002 census); There are 3 streets in this selo.

== Geography ==
This rural locality is located 10 km from Nerchinsk (the district's administrative centre), 220 km from Chita (capital of Zabaykalsky Krai) and 5,441 km from Moscow. Kalinino is the nearest rural locality.
