= Makeyevka, Russia =

Makeyevka (Russian: Макеевка) is the name of several rural localities in Russia:

- Makeyevka, Kursk Oblast, a village in Rusanovsky Selsoviet of Fatezhsky District in Kursk Oblast
- Makeyevka, Republic of Mordovia, a settlement in Michurinsky Selsoviet of Chamzinsky District in the Republic of Mordovia; 54°34′N 45°37′E
- Makeyevka, Tula Oblast, a village in Golovenkovskaya Rural Administration of Shchyokinsky District in Tula Oblast
- Makeyevka, Zabaykalsky Krai, a selo in Nerchinsky District of Zabaykalsky Krai
