= Amur Front =

The Amur Front of the Far Eastern Republic (Russian: Амурский фронт ДВР) was a front of the People's Revolutionary Army of the Far Eastern Republic during the Russian Civil War in Transbaikal.

It was created on April 22, 1920, on base of the partisan formations of the Eastern Transbaikal Front. Its operative area consisted of the following towns: Nerchinsk, Nerchinsky Zavod, Sretensk, Blagoveshchensk, Onon, and Khabarovsk. The Amur Front's headquarters was in Blagoveshchensk.

== The Amur Front's Makeup ==
- 1st Transbaikal Cavalry Corps then Division (Korotayev Yakov)
- 1st Amur Infantry Division
- 2nd Amur Infantry Division
- 1st Amur Cavalry Brigade

== The Amur Front's achievements ==
The troops of the Front repelled successfully the 1920 spring attack of Grigory Semyonov's White Cossacks and the Japanese Expeditionary Corps. The objectives of the attack were an attempt of creating the "Black Buffer" from Chita to Primorye and prevention of establishment of the Far Eastern Republic. After signing the Gongota Agreement between the Government of the Far Eastern Republic and the Japanese Expeditionary Corps, military confrontations in Transbaikal between the People's Revolutionary Army and the Japanese were over and the Amur Front launched the final operation of taking Chita on October 1, 1920. Chita was taken on October 22, 1920, and the rest of Grigory Semyonov's troops had been expelled from Transbaikal by November 1, 1920. At that time the Amur Front included 38,000 personnel, 60 field guns, 191 machine guns, 6 armored trains, 10 tanks.

On November 24, 1920, the Amur Front was reorganized into the 2nd Amur Army.

== Commanders-in-Chief ==
- Dmitriy Shilov (April 22, 1920, to August 18, 1920)
- Semen Seryshev (August 18, 1920, to November 24, 1920)
