= Nerchinsky =

Nerchinsky (masculine), Nerchinskaya (feminine), or Nerchinskoye (neuter) may refer to:

- Nerchinsky District, a district of Zabaykalsky Krai, Russia
- Nerchinskoye Urban Settlement, a municipal formation which the town of Nerchinsk and one rural locality in Nerchinsky District of Zabaykalsky Krai, Russia are incorporated as
