= Olinsk =

Olinsk Олинск
- Selo
- Location within Zabaykalsky Krai Location within Russia
- Coordinates: 52°23′N 116°12′E
- Country: Russia
- Region: Zabaykalsky Krai
- District: Nerchinsky District
- Time zone: UTC+9:00

Olinsk (Russian: Олинск) is a rural locality (a selo) in Nerchinsky District, Zabaykalsky Krai, Russia. Population: 788 (2021 census); 941 (2010 census); 1,043 (2002 census); There are 11 streets in this selo.

== Geography ==
This rural locality is located 53 km from Nerchinsk (the district's administrative centre), 189 km from Chita (capital of Zabaykalsky Krai) and 5,346 km from Moscow. Bolshoy Lug is the nearest rural locality.
