= White movement in Transbaikal =

Part of the Russian Civil War, 1917 to 1920

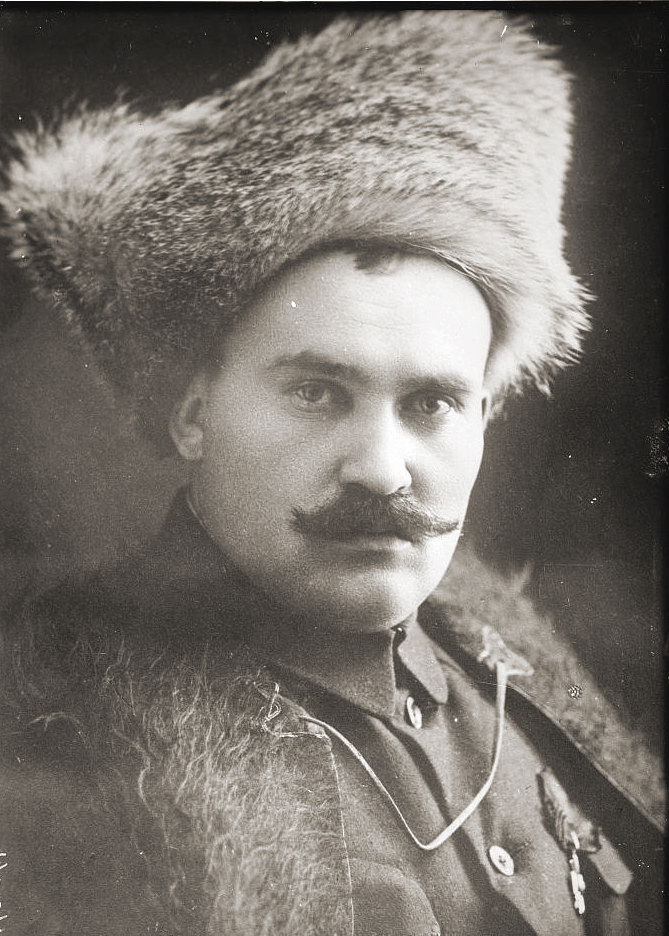
Ataman Semyonov in 1920

The White movement in Transbaikal was a period of the confrontation between the Soviets and the Whites over dominance in Transbaikal from December 1917 to November 1920.

== Initial stages ==
The first regular military formation of the Whites was the Special Manchurian Detachment (SMD) made up of 9 officers, 35 Cossacks and 40 Buryats on December 12, 1917, by Grigory Semyonov. By August, 1918 the SMD had grown to be a considerable force because of Japanese military assistance. The Japanese were interested in gaining Transbaikal and its resources, and they especially supported Grigory Semyonov as a result of a confrontation with the British-supported Admiral Kolchak.

The Special Manchurian Detachment and the Japanese Expeditionary Corps launched the first massive offensive in order to conquer Chita in the spring of 1918 but were repelled. Finally, Chita was taken on 25 August 1918. It was the beginning of the Siberian Intervention of the Japanese and Chita became the headquarters of the Japanese 5th Division for more than two years.

== New reality in Transbaikal ==
The Chita Cossack Regiment

The first action of the newly formed White government was to encourage Baikal Cossacks to join the White Army of Grigory Semyonov. Baikal Cossacks were drafted in the newly formed military formations. Among them, even the Jewish regiment was created in order to raise all possible resources. All in all, Ataman Semyonov managed to create a 20,000 strong army by May 1920.

After taking Chita and expelling the Soviets in the summer of 1918, the future Ataman Semyonov and his advisers started forming new governmental institutions. On August 25, 1918, the Provisional Oblast Government was created in Chita by the former members of the Chita Town Duma, the Transbaikalian Oblast Zemstvo and the Chita Uezd Board. The Provisional Oblast Government included many Jews of various political affiliations.

The Government announced itself to be under jurisdiction of the Provisional Siberian Government located in Omsk and immediately annulled all Soviet acts related to confiscations.

On September 14, 1918, Grigory Semyonov arrived at Chita and, together with the Japanese, he started his transition into an autocrat. He became the Commander-in-Chief of the Separate Eastern Siberian Army, was pronounced as the Ataman of the Baikal Cossacks, and finally, on July 9, 1919, Admiral Kolchak's Government appointed him as the Head of all Governmental Institutions of Transbaikal.

Although he ruled Transbaikalia as an autocrat, Ataman Semyonov kept all representative bodies such as Oblast and Uezd Assemblies and Boards, Town Dumas and trade unions. In addition, Ataman Semyonov tolerated the political activities of various parties, even the Bolsheviks if they didn't attempt to break the law.

During the first months of his rule over Transbaikal, Grigory Semyonov had chosen terror as an oppressive means to deal with the displeased, which ended up creating a massive partisan movement. Ataman Semyonov tried to liberalize his rule, but it was impossible to pacify all conflicting groups.

Together with the Japanese he launched a series of military operations against the partisan resistance movements of Baikal Cossacks and local peasants. A notable operation against the partisans was the Battle of Bogdat in the autumn of 1919 in which Grigory Semyonov almost put an end to the Eastern Transbaikalian Front. The actions of the Japanese and Semyonov's troops brutally dealt with the partisans and locals. As a result, many locals joined the partisans and they became a considerable force of about 30,000 on the Amur Front. In the autumn of 1920 the Amur Front played a significant role in ending Ataman Semyonov's regime in Transbaikal.

After Admiral Kolchak's defeat, Ataman Semyonov formed the Russia Eastern Outskirts Government headed by S. A. Taskin, member of the Constitutional Democratic Party.

== End of Ataman Semyonov's regime in Transbaikal ==
After the defeat of Admiral Kolchak's armies in the Ural and Western Siberia, the Great Siberian Ice march, which was headed for Chita, of the rest of Vladimir Kappel's 30,000 strong army started in January 1920. General Vladimir Kappel died of deep frostbite on January 25, 1920, and his body was briefly buried in Chita. In February 1920 the Russia Eastern Outskirts Forces were formed and on April 27, 1920, as Far Eastern Army, headed by the Commander-in-Chief of all military formations of the Russia Eastern Outskirts, Ataman Grigory Semyonov.
The Army included the following units:

- 1st Transbaikalian Corps Lieutenant-General Grigory Semyonov (March 10 to July 23, 1920); Lieutenant-General Georgy Matsievsky (since July 1920)
- 2nd Separate Rifle Corps Lieutenant-General Grigory Verzhbitsky (February to August 23, 1920); Major-General Innokenty Smolin (since August 23, 1920)
- 3rd Separate Rifle Corps Major-General Viktorin Molchanov (since February 22, 1920)

In addition, all Cossack units were not included into the Far Eastern Army. On August 1, 1920, the Asian Cavalry Division headed by Roman von Ungern-Sternberg was re-formed into a partisan detachment but Ungern-Sternberg's troops left the front for Mongolia.

After the signing of the Gongota Agreement of 1920 between the Far Eastern Republic and the Japanese Expeditionary Corps, Ataman Semyonov was left without any support. He even tried to negotiate with the Soviets and formed the Transbaikalian People's Assembly in order to save his government, but his efforts were in vain. The Japanese troops left Transbaikal on October 19, 1920, and Grigory Semyonov's troops retreated from Chita on October 22. The Far Eastern Army left its supply base at Dauria railway station for Mongolia, where it was engaged in a series of confrontations with the Reds and Chinese troops. After this, the Army moved to Manchuria and fought in the Russian Far East until November 1922, when it was finally evacuated to China. Most of refugees settled near Hailar.

== See also ==
- Siberian Intervention
- Russian Civil War
- White movement
- Anti-communism
- Russia Eastern Outskirts
