= Kangil =

Kangil Кангил
- Selo
- Location within Zabaykalsky Krai Location within Russia
- Coordinates: 52°14′N 116°19′E
- Country: Russia
- Region: Zabaykalsky Krai
- District: Nerchinsky District
- Time zone: UTC+9:00

Kangil (Russian: Кангил) is a rural locality (a selo) in Nerchinsky District, Zabaykalsky Krai, Russia. Population: 270 (2021 census); 316 (2010 census); 356 (2002 census); There are 4 streets in this selo.

== Geography ==
This rural locality is located 35 km from Nerchinsk (the district's administrative centre), 194 km from Chita (capital of Zabaykalsky Krai) and 5,373 km from Moscow. Severnaya Znamenka is the nearest rural locality.
