= Andronnikovo =

Andronnikovo Андронниково
- Selo
- Location within Zabaykalsky Krai Location within Russia
- Coordinates: 51°43′N 116°18′E
- Country: Russia
- Region: Zabaykalsky Krai
- District: Nerchinsky District
- Time zone: UTC+9:00

Andronnikovo (Russian: Андронниково) is a rural locality (a selo) in Nerchinsky District, Zabaykalsky Krai, Russia. Population: 168 (2021 census); 161 (2010 census); There are 5 streets in this selo.

== Geography ==
This rural locality is located 33 km from Nerchinsk (the district's administrative centre), 197 km from Chita (capital of Zabaykalsky Krai) and 5,439 km from Moscow. Volochayevka is the nearest rural locality.
