= Kulakovo, Zabaykalsky Krai =

Kulakovo Кулаково
- Selo
- Location within Zabaykalsky Krai Location within Russia
- Coordinates: 52°00′N 116°00′E
- Country: Russia
- Region: Zabaykalsky Krai
- District: Nerchinsky District
- Time zone: UTC+9:00

Kulakovo (Russian: Кулаково) is a rural locality (a selo) in Nerchinsky District, Zabaykalsky Krai, Russia. Population: 57 (2021 census); 72 (2010 census); 83 (2002 census); There is 1 street in this selo.

== Geography ==
This rural locality is located 25 km from Nerchinsk (the district's administrative centre), 202 km from Chita (capital of Zabaykalsky Krai) and 5,438 km from Moscow. Kotelnikovo is the nearest rural locality.
