= Robert Eikhe =

Latvian Bolshevik revolutionary and Soviet politician

- Roberts Ēķis
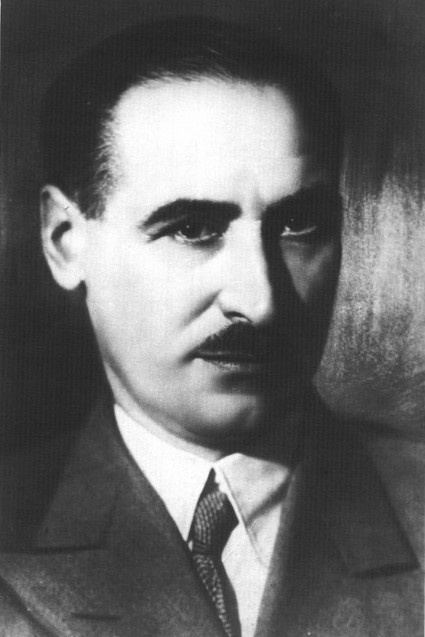
- Eikhe in 1938

People's Commissar for Agriculture
- In office 29 October 1937 – 29 April 1938
- Preceded by: Mikhail Chernov
- Succeeded by: Ivan Benediktov

First Secretary of the West Siberian Regional Committee of the All-Union Communist Party
- In office August 1930 – 17 October 1937
- Preceded by: Office established
- Succeeded by: Office abolished

First Secretary of the Siberian Regional Committee of the All-Union Communist Party
- In office May 1929 – August 1930
- Preceded by: Sergey Ivanovich Syrtsov
- Succeeded by: Office abolished

Chairman of the Executive Committee of the Siberian Regional Council
- In office 20 September 1917 – 26 December 1919
- Preceded by: Office established
- Succeeded by: Stepan Matveeich Kuznetsov

Personal details
- Born: 12 August [O.S. 31 July] 1890 Dobele county, Russian Empire (now Latvia)
- Died: 4 February 1940 (aged 49) Moscow RFSFR, USSR
- Resting place: Donskoye Cemetery
- Party: Latvian Social Democratic Workers' Party (1905-1918); Communist Party of the Soviet Union (1918-1938)
- Relatives: Genrich Eiche (cousin)

Robert Indrikovich Eikhe (Latvian: Roberts Eihe (Ēķis), Russian: Ро́берт И́ндрикович Э́йхе; 12 August 1890 — 4 February 1940) was a Latvian Bolshevik and Soviet politician who was the provincial head of the Communist Party of the Soviet Union in Siberia during the collectivization of agriculture, until his arrest during the Great Purge.

== Early life ==
Robert Eikhe's parents were farm labourers on an estate in Doblen County in what was then Courland province, in modern-day Latvia. He left school at the age of 13 or 14 to become an apprentice in a locksmith's workshop and joined the Social Democracy of the Latvian Territory (which was closely aligned to the Bolsheviks) during the 1905 Revolution. Arrested in August 1907, he spent two months in prison. In February 1908, he was arrested with 18 others at an illegal meeting; he was released under police supervision after six months in prison.

At the end of 1908 he emigrated to the UK. He was a stoker on a steamboat on long voyages, worked in Scotland at a coal mine, and later at a zinc smelter in West Hartlepool.

In 1911, he settled in Riga, believing that he was no longer at risk of a long prison sentence, but was arrested in 1915 and exiled to East Siberia. He escaped to Irkutsk and worked in an oil factory under a false name. He returned to Riga after the February Revolution, but was arrested during the German occupation in January 1918. He escaped to Moscow in July 1918. During 1919, he was People's Commissar for Food in the short-lived Latvian Socialist Soviet Republic. Later that year, he was posted to Chelyabinsk province. He was based in Siberia for the next 18 years.

== Party boss in Siberia ==
In 1929, as a trusted supporter of Joseph Stalin, Eikhe was appointed First Secretary of the Siberian territorial communist party. From 1930, after a boundary change, he was First Secretary of the West Siberian regional party committee, and a member of the Central Committee of the Communist Party in 1930–1938.

Eikhe was also a member of the Politburo commission appointed in January 1930, chaired by Molotov, which drafted instructions on eliminating private farms and forcing the farmers onto collective farms. Speaking in Novosibirsk on 27 January 1930, he called for brutal measures against the kulaks (the name given to 'rich' peasants, or more generally to any who resisted collectivisation). Eikhe called for "the most hostile, reactionary kulaks" to be held in concentration camps in "distant areas of the North" such as Narym or Turukhansk, while the others should be made to do forced labour, such as building a 550-mile road from Tomsk to Yeniseysk. In a single month, in May–June 1931, 39,788 peasant families in West Siberia had their farms seized. In 1933, he opposed a plan to deport a million more victims from Ukraine and west Russia to Siberia, saying that the area could accommodate a maximum of 250,000.

In January 1935, following the assassination of Sergei Kirov, Eikhe was elected a candidate member of the Politburo, making him one of the dozen or so most powerful men in the Soviet Union. At the start of the Great Purge, Eikhe showed utter ruthlessness in eliminating anyone who came under suspicion. On 28 June 1937, he was named as a member of a troika (three member commission) which was given special instructions by the Politburo to round up and execute peasants who had been exiled to Siberia during collectivisation. Its chairman was the recently appointed head of the West Siberian NKVD, Sergei Naumovich Mironov. By 8 July, the troika had lists of 10,924 people who were marked for execution, and 15,036 who were to be sent to the Gulag. By 5 October, the troika had sentenced 13,216 people to death, and 6,205 to the Gulag. Among the victims were Eikhe's former second-in-command V.P. Shubrikov and the chairman of the West Siberian territorial party executive, F.P. Griadinsky

During the preparation of the "Latvian Operation" – in which thousands of Latvians were arrested and killed – Eikhe was summoned to Moscow, and on 30 October 1937 was appointed to the lesser post of USSR People's Commissar for Agriculture.

== Arrest and execution ==
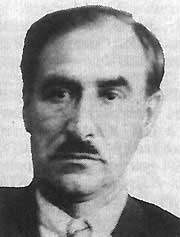
Robert Eikhe c. 1940

Eikhe was arrested on 29 April 1938, as the NKVD enacted Order 49990, which called for the mass arrest of Latvians throughout the USSR. After being tortured by an NKVD officer named Zinovy Ushakov, he confessed to various counter-revolutionary crimes, and implicated others, but after Ushakov had been arrested – when Nikolai Yezhov was replaced as head of the NKVD by Lavrentiy Beria – Eikhe wrote to Stalin on 1 October 1938, renouncing his confession. He sent a second declaration, on 27 October, saying that his confession had been mostly written by Ushakov, "who utilised the knowledge that my broken ribs have not properly mended and have caused me great pain." He persisted in asserting his innocence during his closed trial, on 2 February 1940, but was sentenced to death nonetheless. The following day, he was taken to Beria's office, and subjected to a prolonged beating by the expert torturer Boris Rodos and two other officers (Major General Anatoly Esaulov) and State Security Officer Nikolaev-Zhurid, in a final attempt to force him to confess. Despite being knocked out and beaten while he was prone, and having an eye gouged out, he refused to confess, and was taken away for execution.

As he later wrote to Stalin before his execution: "I now pass to the most shameful page of my life and to my really grave guilt before the Party and before you. This is about my confessions of Communist Party activity. Commissar Kobulov told me that it was impossible to invent all this, and indeed I could never have invented it. The situation was as follows: unable to endure the tortures inflicted on me by Ushakov, Nikolaev-Zhurid and Esaluov, especially the former, who cleverly took advantage of the fact that after the fracture my spine was still badly overgrown and caused me unbearable pain, they forced me to slander myself and other people. I gave this false testimony when the investigator interrogated me for 16 hours, drove me to loss of consciousness, and when he put the ultimatum that you should choose between two pens (a pen and the handle of a rubber truncheon), I, believing that I had been brought to the new prison to be shot, again showed the greatest cowardice and gave slanderous testimony."

Eikhe's wife Yevgenia Yevseyevna Rubtsova was arrested with him in April 1938 and shot on 26 August.

Eikhe's torture and execution was a prominent theme of the famous Secret Speech that Stalin's successor Nikita Khrushchev delivered at the 20th Communist Party Congress in February 1956. He was formally rehabilitated a month later.

== See also ==
- Outline of the Russian Revolution and Civil War
- Bibliography of the Russian Revolution and Civil War
- Bibliography of Stalinism and the Soviet Union
- Index of Old Bolsheviks
- Index of articles related to the Russian Revolution and Civil War
