= Battle of Bogdat =

Military action during the Russian Civil War

- Part of the Eastern Front of the Russian Civil War of the White movement in Transbaikal
Date	September 25 to October 19, 1919
Location	Near villages Bogdat and Homyaki
Result	White victory

Belligerents
Russian SFSR Soviet partisan units	(Russia) White army Empire of Japan

Commanders and leaders
Pavel Zhuravlev	Grigory Semyonov

Strength
2,000	4,000

Casualties and losses
500 killed or wounded, about 200 captured	185 killed or missing

The Battle of Bogdat or The Bogdat Operation (Russian: Богдатское сражение) was the largest battle between the Soviet partisans and the Whites (together with the 5th Japanese Expeditionary Division) during the Russian Civil War in Transbaikal.

In the summer of 1919 the local Resistance movement threatened the regime of the White Cossacks and the Japanese and it was decided to launch a massive offensive on partisan positions in Eastern Transbaikal. Eight Cossack regiments and up to 2,000 Japanese soldiers took part in the operation. The partisans had not anticipated such an offensive and were encircled near Bogdat and Homyaki villages in a day and thereafter the blockade was tightened.

Bogdat was home to the headquarters of the Eastern Transbaikalian Front headed by Pavel Zhuravlev. From September 29 to October 19 the partisans made frantic attempts to break through the encirclement. Finally, two thirds of the units managed to avoid capture and escaped.

== Sources ==
- Шишкин С. И. Гражданская война на Д. Вост. — М., 1957;
- Шерешевский Б. М. Разгром семеновщины. — Новосибирск, 1966.
