= Eastern Okraina =

State

Coordinates: 52°03′N 113°28′E

Eastern Okraina Российская Восточная Окраина (Russian)
- 1920
- Flag

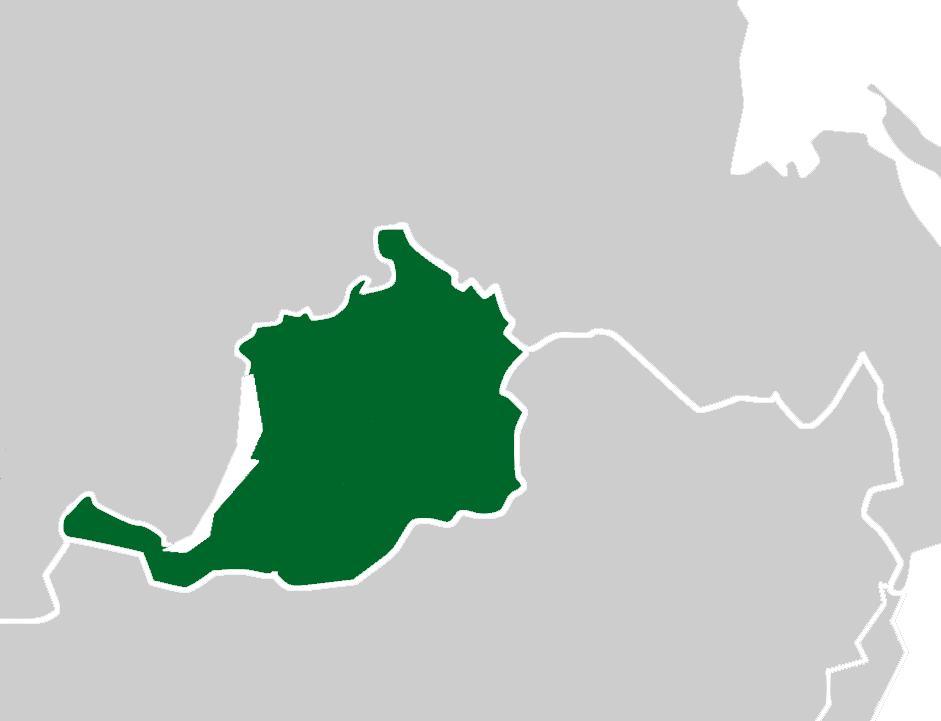
- Territory at the time of its proclamation.
- Capital: Chita
- Common languages: Russian
- Government: Provisional government
  - 1920: Grigory Mikhaylovich Semyonov
- Historical era: Russian Civil War
  - Established: 16 January 1920
  - Disestablished: 28 October 1920
- ISO 3166 code: RU
Preceded by	Succeeded by
Russian State	Far Eastern Republic

The Russian Eastern Okraina (Russian: Российская Восточная Окраина) was a local government that existed in the Russian Far East region in 1920 during the Russian Civil War of 1917–1923.

== History ==
In 1919, White forces in Western Siberia were defeated by the Bolsheviks. On 4 January 1920, the Supreme Ruler of Russia, Alexander Kolchak, issued an order transferring to ataman Grigory Semyonov "the whole civil and military power on the territory of Russia eastern outskirts".

Based on this order, on 16 January 1920, Grigory Semyonov announced in Chita the creation of the "Government of the Russian Eastern Outskirts", with Sergey Taskin as its head. Semyonov's actions were supported by the commanders of Japanese troops in Siberia.

On 6 April 1920, a hastily convened Constituent Assembly gathered at Verkhneudinsk and proclaimed the establishment of a separate administration: the Far Eastern Republic (FER). On 14 May, Japanese commanders agreed to talk with the Bolshevik-oriented FER, and on 24 May negotiations began at Gongota Railway Station, 125 Kilometers west of Chita. The Japanese insisted that the Government of the Russian Eastern Outskirts should be an equal party during the negotiations for the creation of a united Far East government, but the FER disagreed, and negotiations were stopped in early June.

On 3 July 1920, Japan issued a proclamation about evacuating Japanese troops from Siberia. Semyonov understood that he could not survive without Japanese support. He asked the Japanese government to delay the evacuation for four months, and tried to negotiate a merger with the Government of Zemstvo of Maritime Territory, but unsuccessfully.

The Gongota negotiations resumed on 10 July 1920, and on 17 July the FER representatives and Japanese military officials in Siberia signed the Gongota Agreement. The agreed terms provided for Japanese evacuation from the Transbaikal and the establishment of a neutral border zone between the territories of the parties. The Whites understood that they could not stop the Reds without Japanese support, and began to retreat to the southeast, preparing to retreat into Chinese territory. Only small White military forces still held Chita, blocking the Trans-Siberia Railway.

In September 1920, a Provisional Eastern-Transbaikal Assembly was organized under Semyonov's auspices, and Semyonov transferred his civil powers to it. At the same time military forces of the FER, masked as independent groups of partisans, began to move through the neutral zone towards Chita; on 15 September, an assembly of workers of the Eastern Transbaikal Region in Nerchinsk proclaimed the creation of a Regional Revolution committee for the eastern Transbaikal. On 15 October, Japanese troops left Chita, and the Reds demanded the capitulation of the Whites' garrison there. The Whites declined, and on 19 October the Reds began to advance on Chita, which they captured on 22 October. On 25 October the government of the FER moved from Verkhneudinsk to Chita. At the end of October, the Provisional Eastern-Transbaikal Assembly, during a joint session with the Nerchinsk Regional Revolution Committee, declared its own dissolution, and three Far Eastern pro-Soviet governments joined in the united FER. The Eastern Okraina, left without territory, collapsed, and Semyonov and his remaining troops went into exile in Chinese territory.
