= Korotayev =

Korotayev or Korotaev (Russian: Коротаев) is a Russian masculine surname, its feminine counterpart is Korotayeva or Korotaeva. It may refer to

- Aleksandr Korotayev (born 1992), Russian football player
- Andrey Korotayev (born 1961), Russian political scientist and anthropologist
- Yakov Korotayev (1892–1937), Soviet partisan
