= Georgy Matsievsky =

Russian army officer (1880–1941)

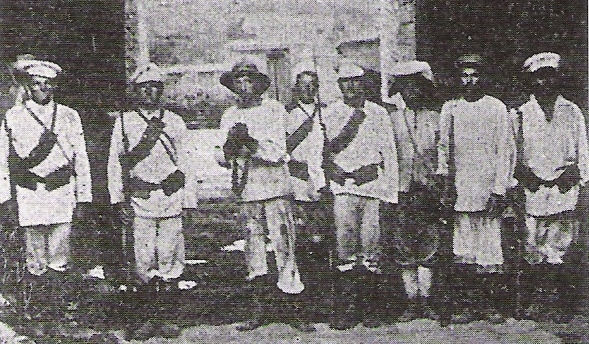
Plastun Cossacks at Beijing

Georgy Matsievsky's Cossacks

Georgy Evgenievich Matsievsky (Russian: Мациевский Георгий Евгеньевич) (10 December 1880 − 23 November 1941, Harbin) was a Baikal Cossack, active participant of the White movement in Transbaikal, Lieutenant general (1919).

He was a son of Evgeniy Matsievsky. Georgy Matsievsky was graduated from the 3rd Moscow Cadet Corps and the Cavalry Institution in 1903. He volunteered as a private Cossack in the 3rd Verkhneudinsk regiment which participated in the suppression of the Boxer Rebellion. Georgy Matsievsky was awarded with the Order of St. George of the Fourth Degree for his bravery during the siege of Wang Gun. From 1903 to 1917, Georgy Matsievsky served as an officer in the 1st Verkhneudinsk regiment.

He took part in the Russo-Japanese War and in May 1904 Georgy Matsievsky was awarded with the Order of Saint Anna of the 4th class when he together with 12 Cossacks broke through from besieged Port Arthur and delivered an important missive to the head of the Manchurian Army. Georgy Matsievsky was wounded repeatedly.

He was shell shocked on 22 February 1915 but stayed on the front. Georgy Matsievsky was decorated with the Distinguished Service Order in 1916 and gained a colonel in 1917.

After the end of the war Georgy Matsievsky joined Grigory Semyonov in his anti-Bolshevik actions. He was one of the first officers enrolled in the Special Manchurian Detachment in December 1917. Georgy Matsievsky headed the 1st Transbaikalian Cossack Regiment (1918), the 1st Transbaikalian Cossack Division (1919) and finally the 1st Transbaikalian Corps of the Far Eastern Army in July 1920. After the defeat and retreat to China in November 1920 Georgy Matsievsky settled down in Harbin where worked as a tramcar driver not participating in political life.

== Bibliography ==
- Орлов Н. Забайкальцы в Маньчжурии в 1900. — СПб., 1901; Новое время. — 1904. — 9 июня;
- Смирнов Н. Н. Слово о заб. казаках. — Волгоград, 1994;
- Василевский В. И. Заб. белая государственность. — Чита, 2000.
