= Pavel Zhuravlev =

Pavel Zhuravlev may refer to:

- Pavel Zhuravlev (partisan) (1887–1920), leader of the partisan movement in Transbaikalia, 1919–1920
- Pavel Zhuravlev (kickboxer) (born 1983), Ukrainian-Russian heavyweight kickboxer and boxer
