= Semyonov's Rebellion =

Rebellion against Soviets in Russian civil war of 1917

- Part of the Eastern Front of the Russian Civil War
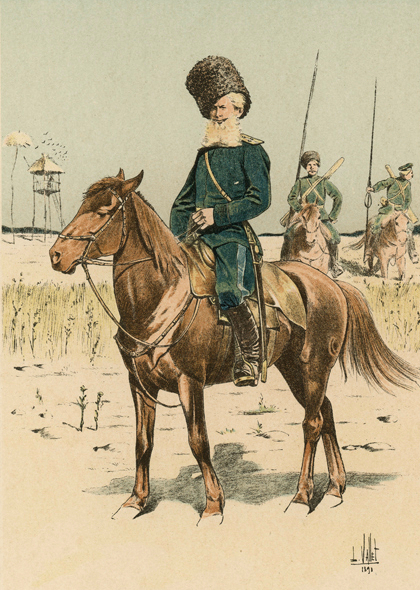
- A typical Kazak horseback unit
Date	November – December 1917
Location	Former Russian Empire

Belligerents
Russian SFSR	Semyonov's Army; Supported by: White Movement

Commanders and leaders
G. M. Semyonov	

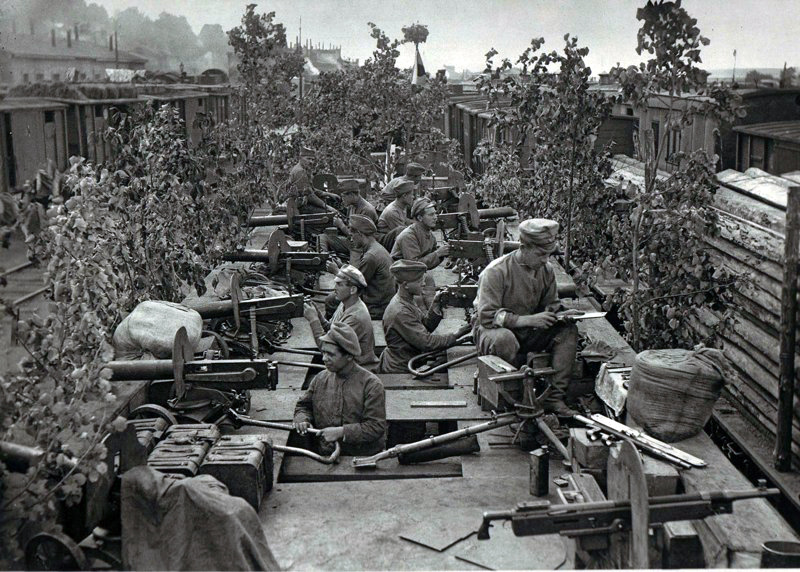

Semyonov's Rebellion refers to the 1917 revolt led by Captain G. M. Semyonov of the Kazak Army, against Soviet control, within the Eastern Region (lit. Further-Baikal Region) of Russia. It is part of the White Movement, and the Russian Civil War (lit. Civil War in the Far East).

In June 1917, G. M. Semyonov was commissioned by the Russian War Commission to form a standing army, composed of Kazak, Mongol, and Buryat horseback forces. However, his work was interrupted by the regime change following the October Revolution.

Following the October Revolution, and after receiving further authorization from the Petrograd Council of Work and Soldier Deputies, Semyonov continued assembling his troops. Contrary to his orders he accepted Russians into his ranks, conditional upon their denunciation of "revolutionism".

As word reached the Petrograd Council that Semyonov was assembling Anti-Revolutionary forces they withheld money promised for the compensation of his army.

On 18 November 1917, Semyonov began an anti-Soviet revolt, seizing control of the lower Berezovka train station. Then, attending a city council in nearby Verkhneudinsk (now Ulan-Ude), he called citizens to overturn the local government and engage in a "merciless war against Bolshivism". The council responded by authorizing the police force (lit. "General Safety Commission") and forces of the oblast council to arrest Captain Semyonov and disarm his regiment. Semyonov resisted by force, in turn traveling to Chita where he arrested Pumpyansky, the head of the Chitian Ruling Council. He also appropriated funds for his army before fleeing to Manzhouli. With support from other local forces, and General D. L. Horvata, the managing officer of the Chinese-East Railroad (China East Iron Road, or "КВЖД") Semyonov formed the Manzhouli Standing Army, composed of around 500 men on horseback. They continued to raid railway stations and incite rebellion.

Eventually the Soviet Army was forced to dispatch a large military force to restore control in the region. These forces were led by Sergei Lazo, from the Central Siberian Council. Their battles with Semyonov's army constituted one of the first fronts of the Civil War in the Far East. Semyonov was considered a candidate for assistance from several foreign governments with interests running counter to the USSR, including the United States. Although Semyonov received support from the Japanese and was initially successful at holding the city of Chita, his forces did eventually suffer defeat around April 1918.

== The Remainder of Semeyonov's Military Career ==
Semeyonov was active in anti-soviet operations until September 1921. When he was unable to remain in Russia, Semyonov moved to the United States for a time, although he was accused of committing acts of violence against the American soldiers of the Expeditionary Corps. He was eventually acquitted and returned to China, where he received a monthly 1000-yen pension by the Japanese government. In Tianjin he made ties with the Japanese intelligence community and mobilized exiled Russian and Cossack communities, planning to eventually overthrow the Soviets. He was also employed by Puyi, the dethroned Emperor of China, whom he wished to restore to power.

Semyonov was captured in Dalian by Soviet paratroopers in September 1945 during the Soviet invasion of Manchuria. He was charged with counterrevolutionary activities and sentenced to death by hanging by the Military Collegium of the Supreme Court of the USSR. He was executed on August 29, 1946.
