= Pavel Zhuravlyov =

- Born: 22 July 1887
- Died: 23 February 1920 (aged 32)

Pavel Nikolayevich Zhuravlyov (Russian: Павел Николаевич Журавлёв; 22 July 1887, Alexandrovsky Zavod – 23 February 1920, Alexandrovsky Zavod) was a leader of the partisan movement in Transbaikalia from 1919 to 1920 during the Ataman Semyonov's regime.

== Early years ==
Being born to poor Cossacks, Pavel Zhuravlyov started working in gold fields when he was 12 years old. In 1915, he was drafted into the Russian Imperial Army and fought on the Romanian Front. After his two wounds, Zhuravlyov was transmitted to a reserve regiment from which he deserted in 1917.

== The Russian Civil War ==
Zhuravlyov came back to Transbaikalia and joined the Bolsheviks, and in April 1918 he was appointed the commander of the Red Army regiment which fought against the Special Machurian Detachment of Ataman Semyonov. After the defeat he fled to Amur Oblast disguising himself as Kudrin. On April 21, 1919, Zhuravlyov was chosen to be the Commander-in-chief of the Eastern Transbaikalian Front, and he participated in the Bogdat battle. Zhuravlyov was deadly wounded near village Molodovsky on February 19, 1920. He was buried in a mass grave at Alexandrovsky Zavod. Many streets were named after him in Transbaikalian cities.
