= Dobele county =

17th–20th century county in Latvia

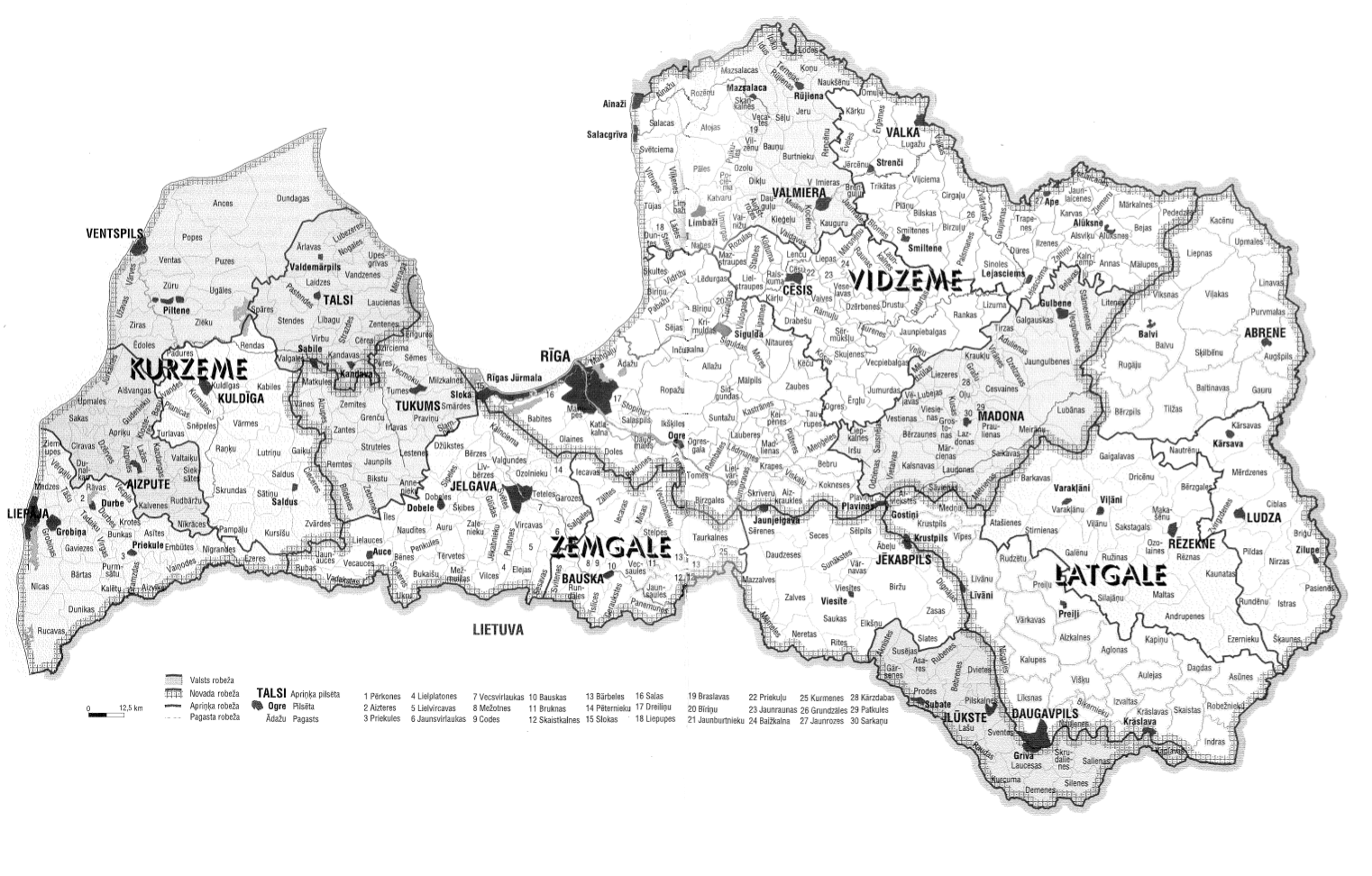
Jelgavas apriņķis (former Dobeles apriņķis) on the map of Latvia (1938).

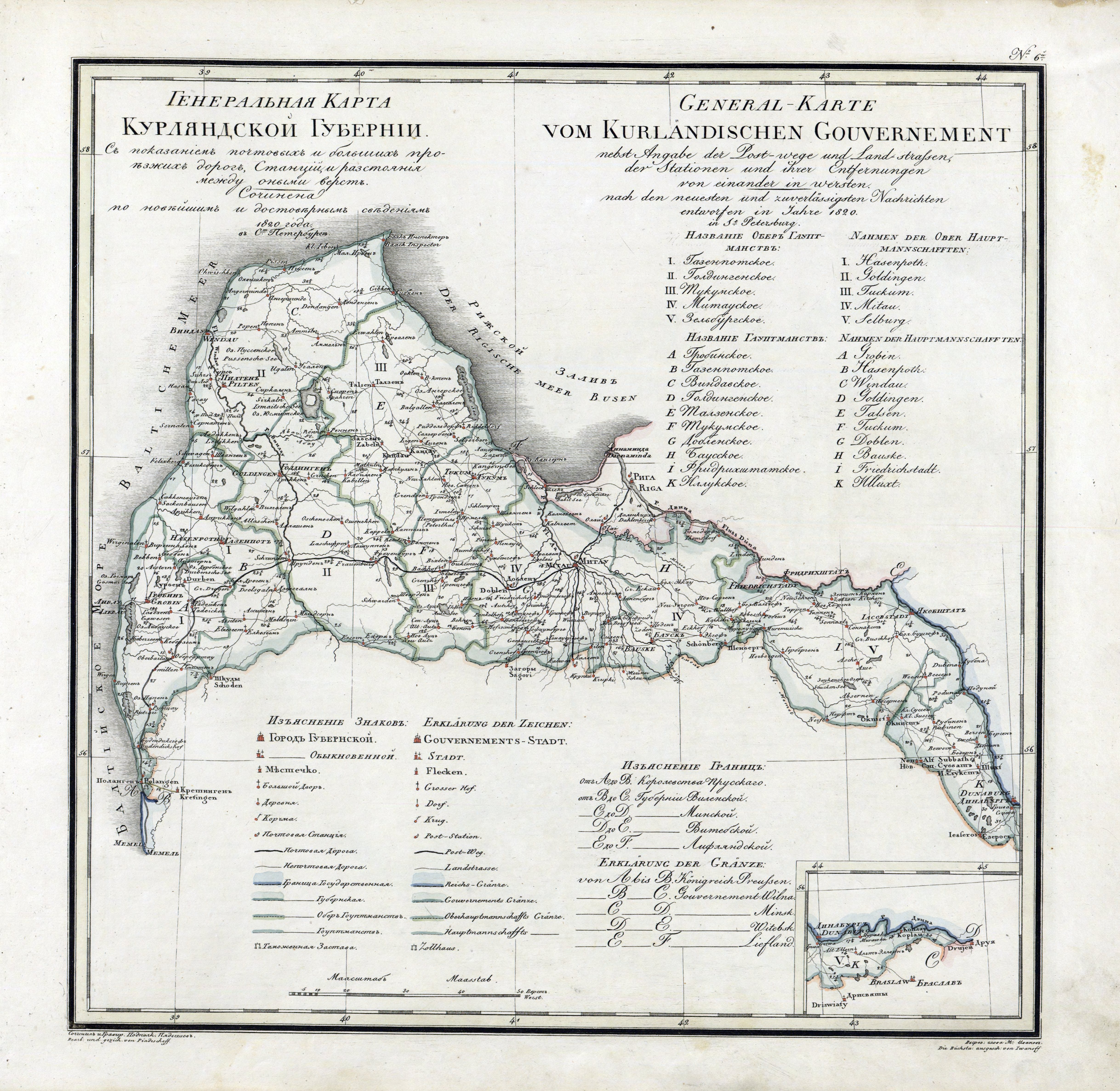
Doblen County on the map of Courland Governorate (1820).

Jelgava county in 1947

Dobele county (Latvian: Dobeles apriņķis, German: Kreis Doblen, Russian: Добленский уезд) was a historic county of the Courland Governorate and of the Republic of Latvia. Its capital was Dobele (Doblen).

== History ==
The Captaincy of Doblen (German: Hauptmannschaft Doblen) was founded in 1617 as a subdivision of the Duchy of Courland and Semigallia. In 1795, the Duchy was incorporated into the Russian Empire, and in 1819 Doblen County (Kreis Doblen) became one of the ten counties of the Courland Governorate.

After the establishment of the Republic of Latvia in 1918, the Dobeles apriņķis existed until 1920, when it was renamed to Jelgava County (Latvian: Jelgavas apriņķis).

== Demographics ==
At the time of the Russian Empire Census of 1897, Kreis Doblen had a population of 101,310. Of these, 76.8% spoke Latvian, 11.0% German, 4.8% Russian, 4.0% Yiddish, 1.2% Lithuanian, 0.9% Polish, 0.4% Tatar, 0.4% Belarusian, 0.2% Romani, 0.1% Estonian and 0.1% Ukrainian as their native language.
