= Yakov Korotayev =

Yakov Nikolaevich Korotayev (Russian: Яков Николаевич Коротаев (Каратаев)) (1892, Onon-Borzya railway station - 1937) was a Soviet partisan in Transbaikal during the Russian Civil War.

He was a Baikal Cossack and participant of World War I in the Persian Campaign. After the end of the war Korotayev returned to Transbaikal and joined the Soviets in their struggle against Ataman Grigory Semyonov on the Transbaikal Front. After the fall of the Soviets in Siberia in the summer of 1918 he was one of the founders of the Altagachansky Commune, the nucleus of the Partisan resistance to Grigory Semyonov's troops and the Japanese Expeditionary Corps. In December 1919 Koroayev headed the 1st Cavalry Regiment. After Pavel Zhuravlev's death he was appointed the commander-in-chief of the Eastern Transbaikalian Front. At the outbreak of the three operations of retaking Chita all partisan formations were reorganized into regular troops and Korotayev headed the Transbaikal Cavalry Division named after him. He was decorated with the Order of the Red Banner.

After the Russian Civil War Korotayev served at many military posts. He was repressed and shot during the Great Purge of 1937-1938.
