= Eastern Transbaikalian Front =

The Eastern Transbaikalian Front (Russian: Восто́чно-Забайка́льский фронт) was a Soviet partisan front from April 21, 1919, to October 7, 1920.

Initially it consisted of three regiments which had fought against Grigory Semyonov's troops and the Japanese Expeditionary Corps. Its headquarters was in villages Bogdat and Zilovo. By September 1919 the front had already included 6 cavalry and 2 infantry regiments and 1 Chinese platoon, all in all, there were 3,000 soldiers. Its troops took part in the Battle of Bogdat.

On May 22, 1920, the front joined the 2nd Rifle Division of the Amur Front. The front together with the Amur Front was responsible for retaking Chita in October 1920.

== Chief-Commanders ==
- Pavel Zhuravlev from April 21, 1919, to February 23, 1920
- Yakov Korotayev from March 2, 1920, to March 21, 1920
- Dmitry Shilov from March 21, 1920, to July 20, 1920
- Vladimir Londo from July 20, 1920, to September 9, 1920
- Vladimir Popov September 9, 1920, to October 7, 1920

== See also ==
- Bibliography of the Russian Revolution and Civil War
- Outline of the Russian Revolution and Civil War
- Index of articles related to the Russian Revolution and Civil War
- The "Russian" Civil Wars, 1916–1926: Ten Years That Shook the World
- Russia in Flames: War, Revolution, Civil War, 1914–1921
- Russia in Revolution: An Empire in Crisis, 1890 to 1928
- Russia: Revolution and Civil War, 1917—1921
- The Russian Revolution: A New History
- Battle of Bogdat
