= Makeyevka, Zabaykalsky Krai =

Makeyevka Макеевка
- Selo
- Location within Zabaykalsky Krai Location within Russia
- Coordinates: 51°59′N 116°30′E
- Country: Russia
- Region: Zabaykalsky Krai
- District: Nerchinsky District
- Time zone: UTC+9:00

Makeyevka (Russian: Макеевка) is a rural locality (a selo) in Nerchinsky District, Zabaykalsky Krai, Russia. Population: 29 (2021 census); 40 (2010 census); There are 3 streets in this selo.
