= Gongota =

Gongota Гонгота
- Settlement
- Location within Zabaykalsky Krai Location within Russia
- Coordinates: 51°46′N 112°15′E
- Country: Russia
- Region: Zabaykalsky Krai
- District: Chitinsky District
- Time zone: UTC+9:00

Gongota (Russian: Гонгота) is a rural locality (a settlement) in Chitinsky District, Zabaykalsky Krai, Russia. Population: 463 (2021 census); 541 (2010 census); There are 6 streets in this settlement.

== Geography ==
This rural locality is located 90 km from Chita (the district's administrative centre and capital of Zabaykalsky Krai) and 5,154 km from Moscow. Sokhondo is the nearest rural locality.
