= Genrich Eiche =

Latvian military historian (1893–1968)

Genrich Christoforovich Eiche (Russian: Ге́нрих Христофо́рович Э́йхе, Latvian: Indriķis Ēķis; September 29 (October 12) 1893, Riga — June 25, 1968 Jūrmala, Latvia) was a Soviet military commander and historian of Latvian ethnicity. He served in World War I as an officer in the Russian Imperial Army before siding with the Bolsheviks and in 1917 being elected Chairman of the Military Revolutionary Committee of his regiment. Eiche also held leading civil posts. He was the cousin of Robert Eikhe.

== Early life ==
Johans Indriķis Mārtiņš Ēķis (Johann Henrich Martin Eiche) was born on 29 September 1893, in Riga, Russian Empire. His father Kristaps (Christof) and mother Lina (née Laudon) were ethnic Latvians from rural areas of the center and north-west of the Courland Governorate respectively. Christoph's income from working as a forwarding agent enabled his wife to concentrate on taking care of Henrich and his older brother Friedrich Wilhelm (born in 1890).

At the age of 12 Eiche took part in several demonstrations and meetings of workers during the course of the 1905 Russian Revolution, witnessing their violent suppression by Orenburg Cossacks. Eiche's political views were further influenced by his cousins who were active members of the Latvian branch of the Russian Social Democratic Labour Party.

In January 1906, he enrolled in the Riga Commercial Academy, graduating on 23 December 1911. In January 1912, he began his apprenticeship at the Riga based Helmsing & Grimm shipping agency. In late 1913, Eiche finished his apprenticeship, becoming a full-time employee in the company's import department. In a pursuit of his passion for music Eiche visited Berlin, where he enrolled in a composition correspondence course in the Berlin Conservatory.

== Military service ==
His studies were interrupted by the outbreak of World War I, whereupon he was drafted into the Russian Imperial Army as a private on 17 October 1914. After completing Warrant Officers’ Training School in 1915 he was sent to the front. He commanded a squadron, and was a staff captain.

After the February Revolution of 1917 he was elected to the regimental committee, and during the Russian Revolution of 1917 he was elected Chairman of the Military Revolutionary Committee of the 245th Infantry Regiment. In November 1917 he was elected to the Council of Soldiers' Deputies of the 10th Army and was a member of the board for the formation of the Red Guard.

He took part in suppressing the insurrection of the Polish corps under General Józef Dowbor-Muśnicki. In March 1918 he voluntarily enlisted in the Red Army. From August 1918 to November 1919 he commanded a regiment, a brigade and the 26th Infantry Division (beginning April 1919) on the Eastern Front. From November 1919 to January 1920 he was Commander of the 5th Army.

From March 1920 to April 1921 Eiche served as Commander-in-Chief of the People's Revolutionary Army of the Far Eastern Republic. He was recalled to Moscow only after his mission was completed: i.e., the entire Far East was merged into the buffer Far Eastern Republic; all the major White Guard groups in the Far East were eliminated; the Japanese troops occupying the Far East were forced to withdraw from the Trans-Baikal, Amur and Primorye regions; and partisan units were reorganized into the regular army following the pattern of the Red Army of the time.

In 1921 he was sent to Belarus as a Commander to lead the struggle to eliminate guerilla groups and White Russian partisan units. This mission was completed by the spring of 1922. For successful discharge of his duties he was awarded the Certificate of Merit of the All-Russia Central Executive Committee.

In March 1922, upon order of the Central Committee Bureau of Organization, he was transferred from Belarus to Central Asia to counter the Basmachi Revolt in Fergana as Commander of the Fergana Region.

From 1923 until the day of his arrest in April 1938 he worked in government institutions in Moscow, including more than 12 years (beginning in 1924) in leading positions in Narkomvneshtorg, the Ministry of Foreign Trade.

== Great Purge ==
During the Great Purge as a part of the so-called "Latvian Operation", in May 1938 he was arrested and convicted by the NKVD’s Counterintelligence Department on charges of "involvement in a Latvian counterrevolutionary organization" and as the cousin of Robert I. Eiche, a former member of the Central Committee (sentenced to be shot, posthumously rehabilitated in the 1950s). After sentencing, Eiche was incarcerated in the NKVD's Lefortovo Prison in Moscow. During this, he endured beatings and torture. His investigator was led by Major of State Security Zinovy Markovich Ushakov. During this, he pierced his temple, which led to partial hearing loss. Following that, he served time in the gulags. After release from the camps, he was in exile in the Far North. Also arrested at the same time was "the wife of an enemy of the people" was Maria Alexandrovna Eiche. She was incarcerated in Butyrka Prison. After her release, she voluntarily followed her husband into exile.

== Later years ==
Eiche was rehabilitated sixteen years later. In April 1954 the Military Board of the USSR Supreme Court repealed the decision of the NKVD Counterintelligence Department and dismissed the case for absence of the event of a crime. Returning to Moscow after his release, as a member of the Military-Historical and Scientific Society Council of the Central Museum of the Soviet Army, Eiche was also active as a military historian and writer, devoting a great deal of time and effort to the editing of military/historical literature.

Eiche authored several books on the history of the Civil War in the Urals, Siberia, and the Far East. He died June 25, 1968 in Jūrmala, Latvia and is buried at Moscow’s Vvedenskoye Cemetery.

== Awards ==
For participating in all of the battles of the 245th Infantry, Berdyansk Regiment, 62nd Infantry Division, 10th Army of the Western Front from August 1915 to the end of 1917, Eiche was awarded:

- Order of St. Stanislaus, 3rd class, with swords and ribbon
- Order of St. Stanislaus, 2nd class, with swords
- Order of St. Anne, 4th class
- Order of St. Anne, 3rd class, with swords and ribbon
- Order of St. Anne, 2nd class, with swords

During the years of the Civil War Eiche was awarded:

- Order of the Red Banner No. 96
- Certificate of Merit of the All-Russia Central Executive Committee on the award of a gold engraved watch (as Commander of the 3rd Brigade, 26th Infantry Division, for successful operations against Kolchak in the winter of 1918 - Urals Operation)
- Special Custom Award Certificate issued by the Revolutionary Military Council of the Republic, as Divisional Commander of the 26th Infantry, for the successfully forced crossing of the Belaya River, and the crushing defeat and capture of Kolchak's army - Birsk Operation, 1919.
- Certificate of Award from the All-Russia Central Executive Committee as Commander of the Minsk region (1922)

After his release Eiche was awarded:

- Order of Lenin in honor of the 50th anniversary of the Soviet regime (1967)

== Selected works ==
• Forced Crossing of the Belaya River by Units of the 5th Army of the Eastern Front in June 1919, Moscow-Leningrad, 1928 [Форсирование реки Белой частями 5-й армии Восточного фронта в июне 1919 г., М.- Л., 1928]; • Tactical Lessons from the Civil War, Moscow, 1931 [Тактические поучения гражданской войны, М., 1931]; • Kolchak’s Ufa Adventure, Moscow, 1966 [Уфимская авантюра Колчака, М., 1966]; • Defeated Rear, Moscow, 1966 [Опрокинутый тыл, М., 1966].

== Sources ==
- Badikov, Roman (2016). "Г. Х. Эйхе: опыт исследования детских и юношеских лет жизни красного командарма" [G. H. Eiche:a study of the childhood and youth of the red komandarm]. Modern History of Russia (in Russian). 17 (3). Saint Petersburg State University: 84–92.
- Бадиков Р.А. В тени М.В. Фрунзе и В.И. Чапаева: деятельность Г.Х. Эйхе в апреле-июне 1919 г. // Российская история. 2016. № 3. — С. 111-126. In Russian.
- Бадиков Р.А. Генрих Христофорович Эйхе // Вопросы истории. 2015. № 1. — С. 45-59. In Russian.
