= Gongota Agreement of 1920 =

Ceasefire agreement during Russian Civil War

Coordinates: 51.771643°N 112.247112°E

Russian: Гонготское соглашение Japanese: 緩衝国建設覚書
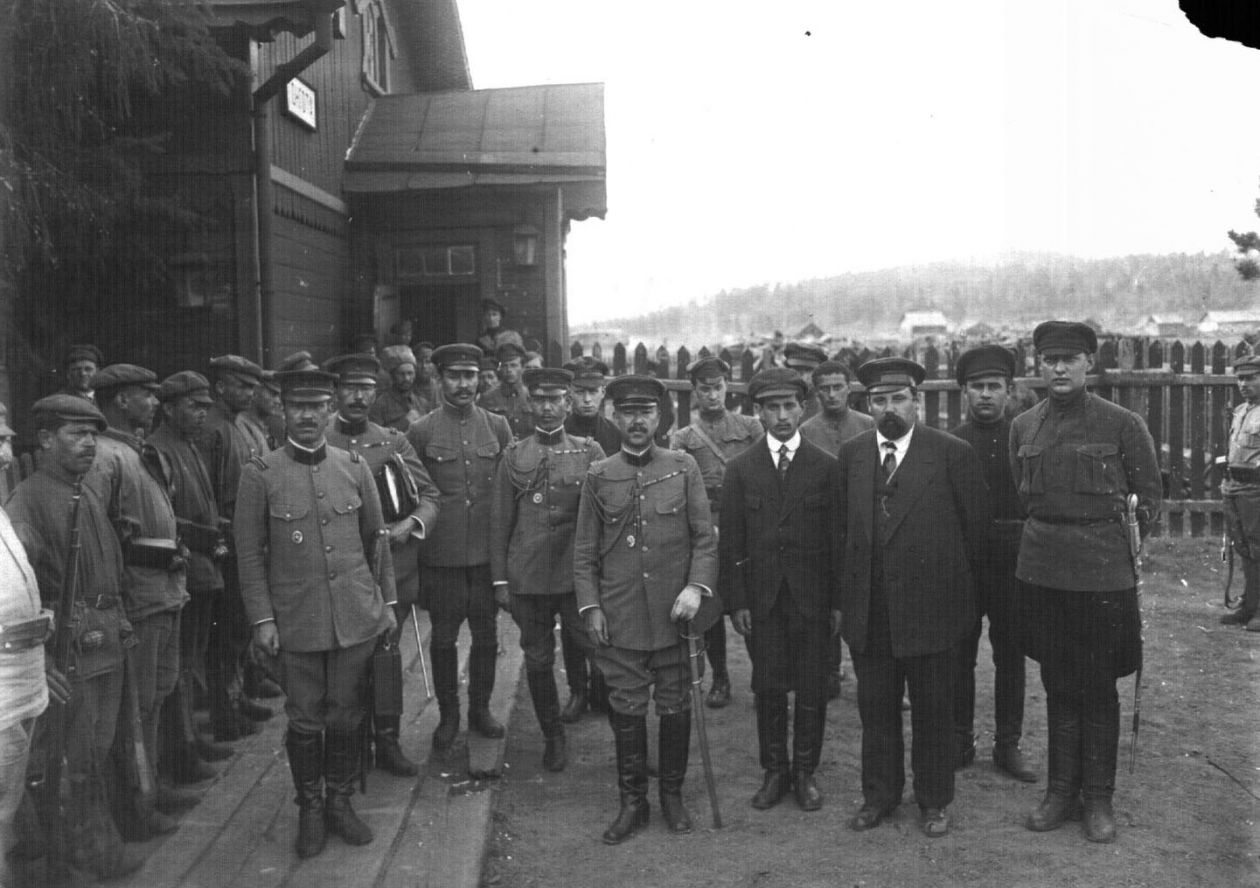
- Yasutarou Takayanagi (center) and Vladimir Sergeevich Shatov (right of center) at Gongota railway station
- Type: Ceasefire
- Signed: July 15, 1920
- Location: Gongota, Far Eastern Republic
- Effective: July 17, 1920
- Parties: Japan; Far Eastern Republic
- Language: Russian, Japanese

Full text
- 緩衝国建設覚書 at Wikisource

The Gongota Agreement of 1920 (Russian: Гонготское соглашение, Japanese: 緩衝国建設覚書 (lit. Memorandum of establishing buffer state) was a truce signed during the Russian Civil War in Transbaikal. The Agreement was finalized at Gongota railway station on July 15, 1920, between the Far Eastern Republic's delegation headed by Alexander Krasnoshchyokov and Genrich Eiche and the Japanese Expeditionary Corps under Yui Mitsue. The Far Eastern Republic's demands were the evacuation of White Army troops from the zone held by the Japanese forces and the end of hostilities between the Soviets and Japan.

The process was not easy for the Far Eastern Republic authorities because the Japanese tried to postpone their evacuation from the region. Finally, the Japanese agreed stopping military actions against the FER troops and partisans. A no man's line was created west of Chita and it helped the Far Eastern Republic launch the final operation of taking Chita.
