= Grigory Semyonov (general) =

Russian general (1890–1946)

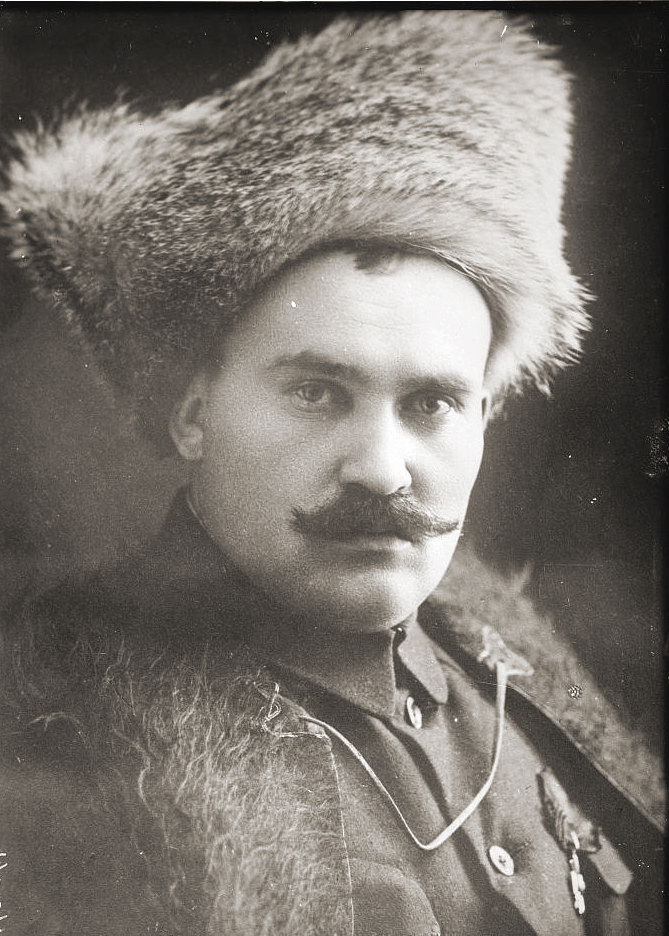
- Semyonov in 1920
- Born: September 25, 1890; Kuranzha Village, Transbaikal Oblast, Russian Empire
- Died: August 30, 1946 (aged 55) Moscow, Russian SFSR, Soviet Union
- Cause of death: Execution by hanging
- Allegiance: Russian Empire (1911–1917); Russian Republic (1917–1921)
- Branch: (Russian Empire) Imperial Russian Army (Russian Republic) White Movement
- Service years: 1911–21
- Rank: Lieutenant General
- Commands: Far Eastern Army
- Conflicts: World War I Russian Civil War
- Awards: Order of St. George (twice)

Grigory Mikhaylovich Semyonov, or Semenov (Russian: Григо́рий Миха́йлович Семёнов; September 25, 1890 – August 30, 1946), was a Japanese-supported leader of the White movement in Transbaikal and beyond from December 1917 to November 1920, a lieutenant general, and the ataman of Baikal Cossacks (1919). He was the commander of the Far Eastern Army during the Russian Civil War. He was also a prominent figure in the White Terror. U.S. Army intelligence estimated that he was responsible for executing 30,000 people in one year.

== Early life and career ==
Semyonov was born in the Transbaikal region of eastern Siberia. His father, Mikhail Petrovich Semyonov, was Russian; his mother was a Buryat. Semyonov spoke Mongolian and Buryat fluently. He joined the Imperial Russian Army in 1908 and graduated from Orenburg Military School in 1911. Commissioned first as a khorunzhiy (cornet or lieutenant), he rose to the rank of yesaul (Cossack captain), distinguished himself in battle against the Germans and the Austro-Hungarians in World War I, and earned the Saint George's Cross for courage.

Pyotr Wrangel wrote:

Semenov was a Transbaikalian Cossack – dark and thickset, and of the rather alert Mongolian type. His intelligence was of a specifically Cossack calibre, and he was an exemplary soldier, especially courageous when under the eye of his superior. He knew how to make himself popular with Cossacks and officers alike, but he had his weaknesses in a love of intrigue and indifference to the means by which he achieved his ends. Though capable and ingenious, he had received no education, and his outlook was narrow. I have never been able to understand how he came to play a leading role.

As somewhat of an outsider among his fellow officers because of his ethnicity, he met another officer shunned by his peers, Baron Ungern-Sternberg, whose eccentric nature and disregard for the rules of etiquette and decorum repelled others. He and Ungern tried to organize a regiment of Assyrian Christians to aid in the Russian fight against the Ottomans. In July 1917, Semyonov left the Caucasus and was appointed commissar of the Provisional Government in the Baikal region and was responsible for recruiting a regiment of Buryat volunteers.

== Russian Civil War in Transbaikal ==
After the October Revolution of November 1917, Semyonov stirred up a sizable anti-Soviet rebellion but was defeated after several months of fighting, and he fled to the northeastern Chinese city of Harbin. He then moved to Manzhouli in Inner Mongolia, where the Chinese Eastern Railway met the Chita Railway, expelled the Bolshevik garrison guarding the rail junction, and recruited an army, mainly from Buryat and Chinese recruits. In January 1918, he invaded Transbaikal, but by February, had been forced by Bolshevik partisans to retreat back to Manzhouli, where he was visited by R.B.Denny, British Military Attache in Beijing, who formed an "extremely favourable impression of him". On his recommendation, the Foreign Office in London agreed to pay Semyonov £10,000 a month, with no conditions attached,. The French government also decided to give him financial aid, while the Japanese placed an intelligence officer, Captain Kuroki Chikayochi, in Semyonov's headquarters. The British subsidies ended, by which time "Japanese influence was so strong that Semyonov was for practical purposes a puppet."

In April 1918, Semyonov launched another raid into Siberia with the help of the Czechoslovak Legion. By August 1918, he had managed to consolidate his positions in the Transbaikal region, where he set up a provisional government. On 6 September, his men captured Chita, and slaughtered 348 of its citizens. He made Chita his capital. Semyonov declared a "Great Mongol State" in 1918 and had designs to unify the Oirat Mongol lands, portions of Xinjiang, Transbaikal, Inner Mongolia, Outer Mongolia, Tannu Uriankhai, Kobdo, Hulunbei'er, and Tibet into one Mongolian state. The region under his control, also called Eastern Okraina, extended from Verkhne-Udinsk near Lake Baikal to the Shilka River and the town of Stretensk, to Manzhouli and northeast some distance along the Amur Railway. In early 1919, Semyonov declared himself ataman of the Transbaikal Cossack Host.

In his rule over the Transbaikal, Semyonov has been described as a "plain bandit [who] drew his income from holding up trains and forcing payments, no matter what the nature of the load nor for whose benefit it was being shipped". He handed out copies of the Protocols of the Elders of Zion to the Japanese troops with whom he became associated.

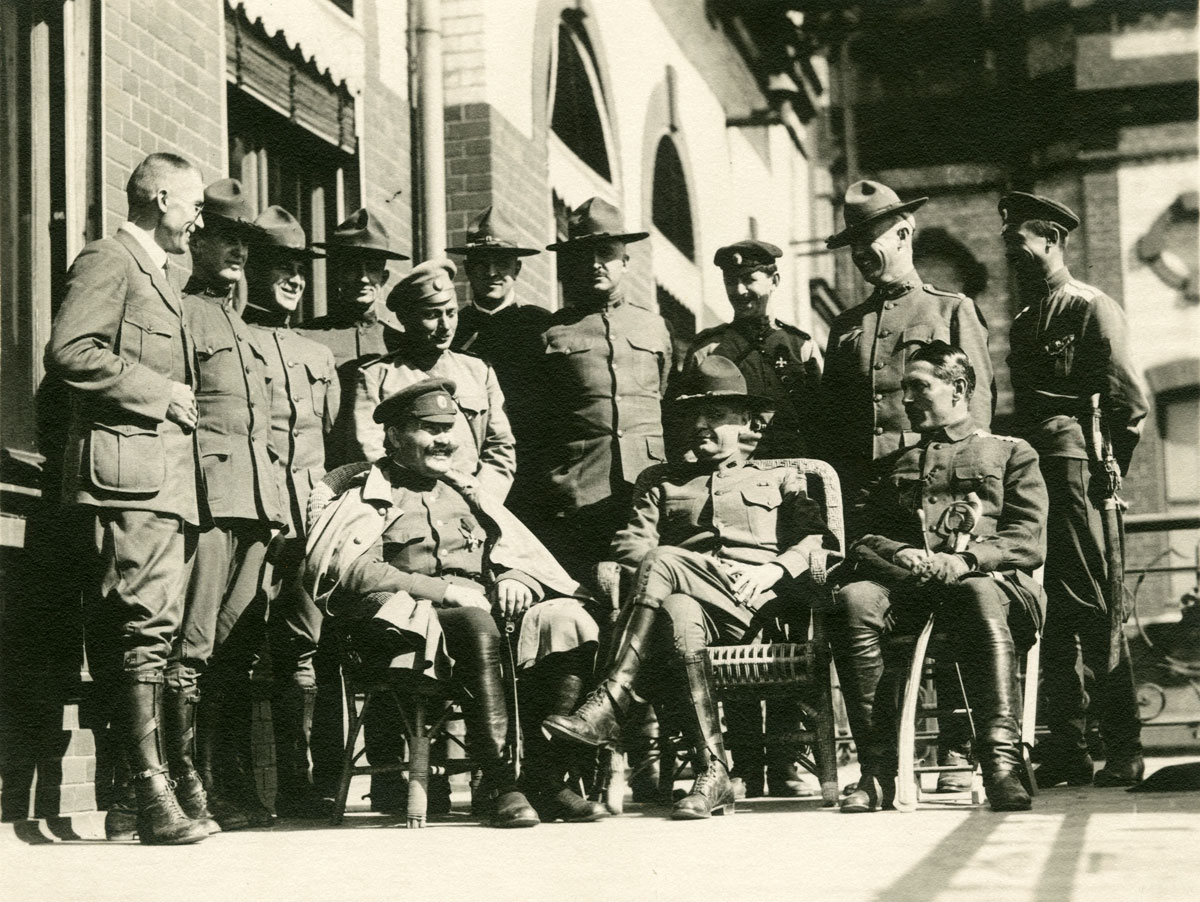
Ataman Semyonov with the representatives of the American expedition to the Russian Civil War. Seated: Semyonov (left) and General Graves (right)

With Japanese protection, he recognised no other authority. When Admiral Aleksandr Kolchak, who was based in Omsk, in Siberia, was declared Supreme Ruler by the White Armies, Semyonov refused to submit to him. They had met once, in Manzhouli, in May 1918, when Semyonov insulted Kolchak by failing to be at the railway station to greet him. Kolchak considered sending an army into Transbaikal to remove Semyonov, but had to abandon the idea because Semyonov was protected by the Japanese, who had 72,000 troops in Siberia. In October 1919, Kolchak recognised Semyonov as commander-in-chief of the Transbaikal region.

In December 1919, Semyonov sent a detachment to Irkutsk, which had been the last city west of Lake Baikal still nominally under Kolchak's rule until a coalition of Mensheviks and Socialist Revolutionaries seized control. The detachment reached Irkutsk, but did nothing except take 30 men and one young woman hostage. They took their hostages aboard an icebreaker on Lake Baikal, where, on 5 January, they clubbed them to death with a wooden mallet, one by one, and threw them overboard - all except for one man who put up a fight and was thrown alive into the freezing water.

When Kolchak resigned on 4 January 1920 he transferred his military forces in the Far East to Semyonov. However, Semyonov was unable to keep his troops in Siberia under control: they stole, burned, murdered, and raped, developing a reputation for being little better than thugs. In July 1920, the Japanese Expeditionary Corps started a limited withdrawal in accordance with the Gongota Agreement, which was signed on 15 July 1920 with the Far Eastern Republic and undermined support for Semyonov. Transbaikal partisans, internationalists, and the 5th Soviet Army under Genrich Eiche launched an operation to retake Chita. In October 1920, units of the Red Army and guerrillas forced Semyonov's army out of the Baikal region. He escaped by plane to Manchuria. In late May 1921 Semyonov travelled to Japan, where he received some support. He returned to the Primorye in the hope of continuing to fight against the Soviets, but was finally forced to abandon all of Russian territory by September 1921.

== In exile ==
He eventually returned to China, where he was given a monthly 1000-yen pension by the Japanese government. In Tianjin, he made ties with the Japanese intelligence community and mobilized exiled Russian and Cossack communities that planned an eventual overthrow of the Soviets. He was also employed by Puyi, the dethroned Emperor of China, whom he wished to restore to power.

While he was an exile in China, he was still backed by the Japanese. His influence was such that when Anastasy Vonsiatsky of the Russian Fascist Party wanted to visit Manchukuo, the Japanese puppet state in Manchuria, he needed Semyonov's help in getting a visa. Vonsiatsky, however, saw Semyonov as a threat to his dream of being Russia's Mussolini, and declared that he should be shot, an outburst that led to the Russian Fascist Party splitting in two. Konstantin Rodzaevsky, who supplanted Vonsiatsky as the leader of the Russian Fascists in China co-operated with Semyonov to placate the Japanese.

In 1934, the Japanese formed the Bureau for Russian Emigrants in Manchuria (BREM; Бюро по делам российских эмигрантов в Маньчжурской империи), which were nominally under the control of the recent Russian Fascist Party and provided identification papers necessary to live, work and travel in Manchukuo. Much more in favor with the Japanese than White General Vladimir Kislitsin, Semyonov replaced him as BREM's chairman from 1943 to 1945.

== Arrest and execution ==
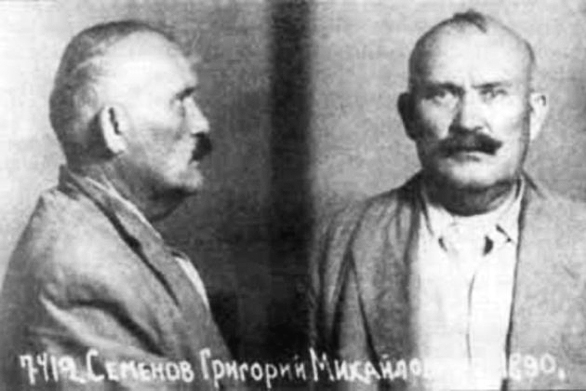
Photo of Semyonov after his arrest by Soviet authorities

Semyonov was captured in Dalian by Soviet paratroopers in September 1945 during the Soviet invasion of Manchuria in which the Red Army conquered Manchukuo. He was taken to Moscow, and put on trial with seven others, including Rodzaevsky in front of the Military Collegium of the Supreme Court of the USSR. He pleaded guilty to espionage, sabotage, terrorism, and armed struggle, and was sentenced to death by hanging. Semyonov was executed on August 29, 1946.
