= Nerchinsky District =

Nerchinsky District Нерчинский район (Russian)
- District
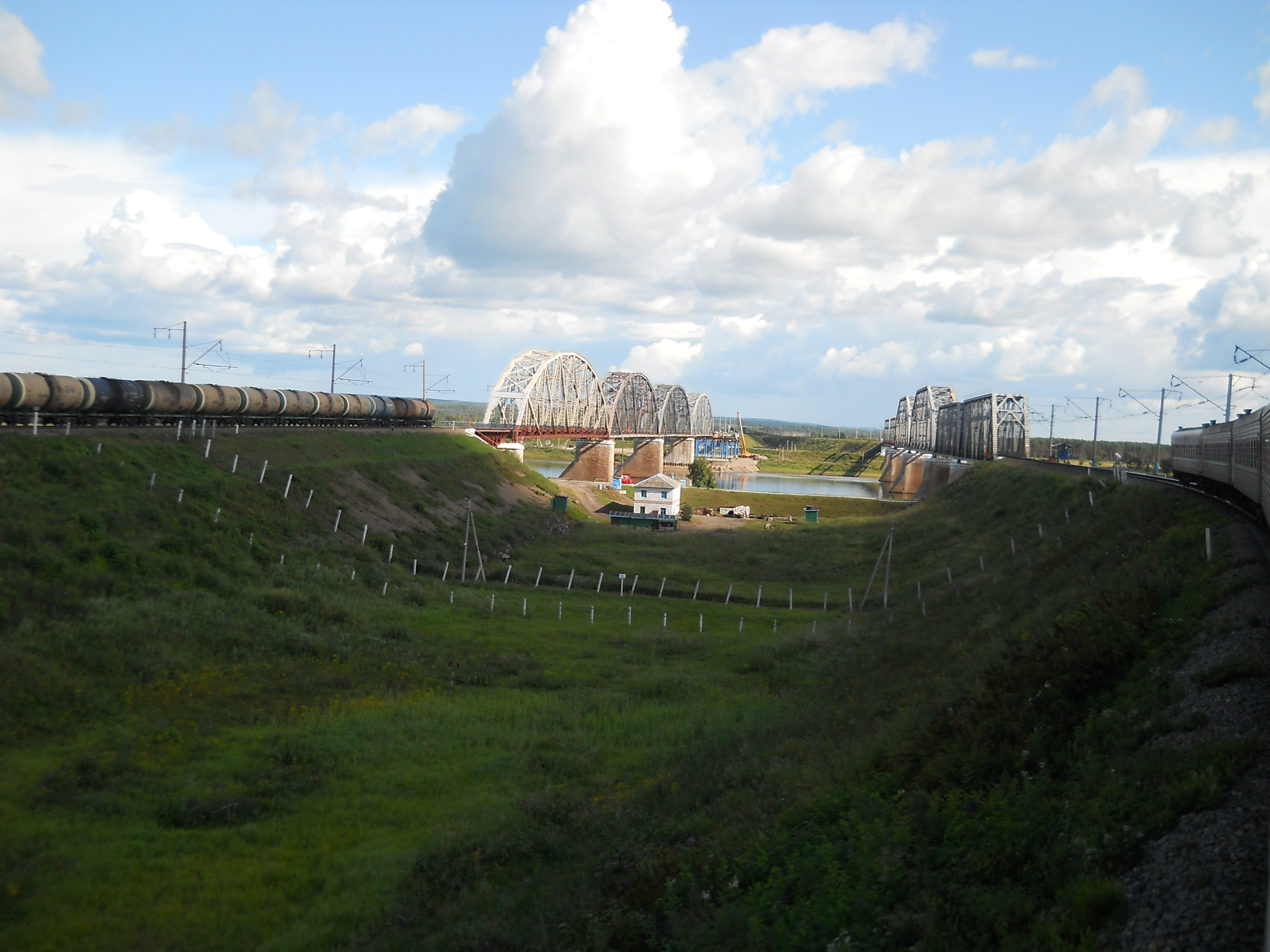
- Bridges in Nerchinsky District

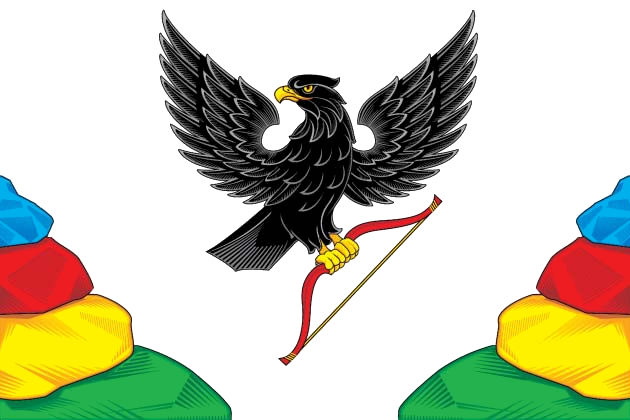
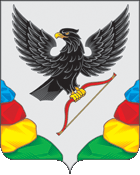
- Flag Coat of arms
- Location of Nerchinsky District in Zabaykalsky Krai
- Coordinates: 51.972°N 116.569°E
- Country: Russia
- Federal subject: Zabaykalsky Krai
- Established: January 4, 1926
- Administrative center: Nerchinsk

Area
  - Total: 5,500 km^{2} (2,100 sq mi)

Population (2010 Census)
  - Total: 28,455
  - Estimate (2018): 27,234 (−4.3%)
  - Density: 5.2/km^{2} (13/sq mi)
  - Urban: 57.9%
  - Rural: 42.1%

Administrative structure
  - Inhabited localities: 1 cities/towns, 1 urban-type settlements, 33 rural localities

Municipal structure
  - Municipally incorporated as: Nerchinsky Municipal District
  - Municipal divisions: 2 urban settlements, 13 rural settlements
- Time zone: UTC+9 (MSK+6)
- OKTMO ID: 76628000

Nerchinsky District (Russian: Нерчинский райо́н) is an administrative and municipal district (raion), one of the thirty-one in Zabaykalsky Krai, Russia. It is located in the center of the krai, and borders with Tungokochensky District in the north, Chernyshevsky District in the east, Baleysky District in the south, and with Shilkinsky District in the west. The area of the district is 5,500 square kilometers (2,100 sq mi). Its administrative center is the town of Nerchinsk. Population: 28,455 (2010 census); 30,694 (2002 Census); 33,755 (1989 Soviet census). The population of Nerchinsk accounts for 52.6% of the district's total population.

== History ==
The district was established on January 4, 1926.
