= Nerchinsk =

Town of Nerchinsky District in Zabaykalsky Krai, Russia

Nerchinsk Нерчинск
- Town
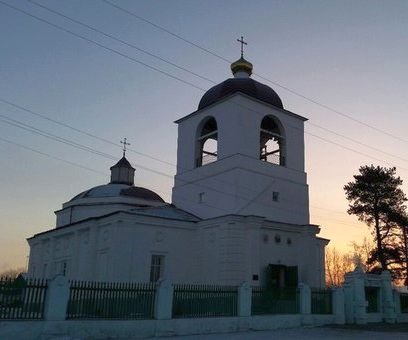

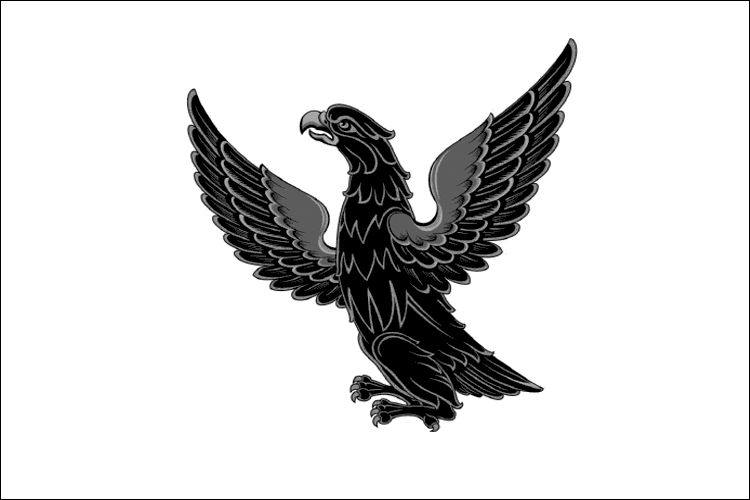
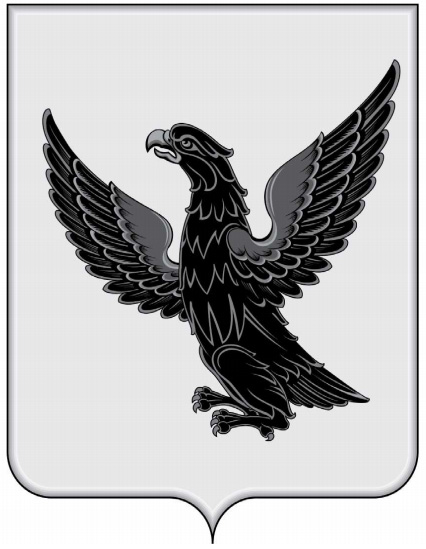
- Flag Coat of arms
- Interactive map of Nerchinsk
- Location of Nerchinsk Nerchinsk (Zabaykalsky Krai)
- Coordinates: 51°59′40″N 116°33′20″E
- Country: Russia
- Federal subject: Zabaykalsky Krai
- Administrative district: Nerchinsky District
- Founded: 1653
- Elevation: 490 m (1,610 ft)

Population (2010 Census)
  - Total: 14,959
  - Estimate (January 2014): 14,775 (−1.2%)

Administrative status
  - Capital of: Nerchinsky District

Municipal status
  - Municipal district: Nerchinsky Municipal District
  - Urban settlement: Nerchinskoye Urban Settlement
  - Capital of: Nerchinsky Municipal District, Nerchinskoye Urban Settlement
- Time zone: UTC+9 (MSK+6)
- Postal codes: 673400, 673402, 673403, 673429, 673840
- OKTMO ID: 76628101001
- Website: гпнерчинское.нерчинск.забайкальскийкрай.рф

Nerchinsk (Russian: Не́рчинск; Buryat: Нэршүү, Nershüü; Mongolian: Нэрчүү, Nerchüü; Manchu: ᠨᡳᠪᠴᡠ, Möllendorff: Nibcu, Abkai: Nibqu) is a town and the administrative center of Nerchinsky District in Zabaykalsky Krai, Russia, located on the left bank of the Nercha River, 7 kilometers (4.3 mi) above its confluence with the Shilka River, 644 kilometers (400 mi) east of Lake Baikal, about 225 kilometers (140 mi) west of the Chinese border, and 305 kilometers (190 mi) east of Chita, the administrative center of the krai. Population: 14,959 (2010 census); 15,748 (2002 census); 16,961 (1989 Soviet census); 6,713 (1897).

== Town name in other languages ==
Two important treaties between the Russian Empire and the Qing Dynasty mention Nerchinsk: the 1689 Treaty of Nerchinsk and the 1727 Treaty of Kyakhta. Non-Russian comments on these treaties or on the history of the town may mention other names:

- Latin: Nipchou or Nipcha (however, the Treaty of Kyakhta called the town Nipkoa)
- Manchu: Nibcu hoton
- Chinese: 尼布楚; Pinyin: Níbùchǔ

== History ==
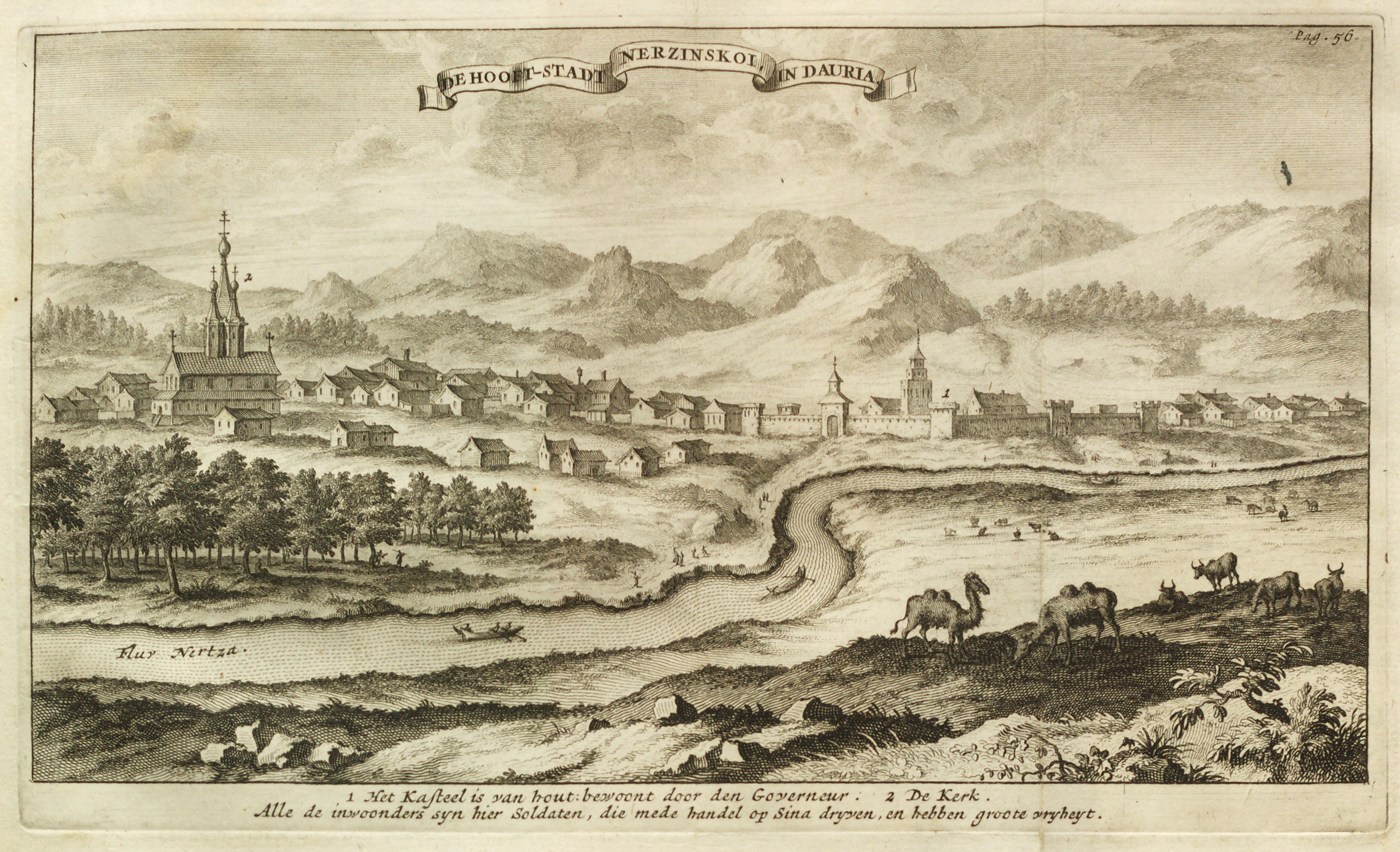
View of Nerchinsk, from Eberhard Isbrand Ides (1710), Driejaarige reize naar China (Dutch edition)

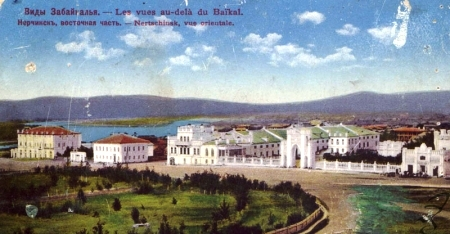
A 1900 postcard showing the Butin Palace in Nerchinsk

The fort of Nerchinsk dates from 1654. Afanasy Pashkov founded the town four years later; in that year he opened direct communication between the Russian settlements in Transbaikalia and those on the Amur River which had been founded by Cossacks and fur-traders from the Yakutsk region. In 1689 Russia and China signed the Treaty of Nerchinsk, which stopped the farther advance of the Russians into the basin of the Amur for two centuries (see Sino-Russian border conflicts).

After that, Nerchinsk became the chief center for Russian trade with China. The opening of the western route through Mongolia, via Urga, and the establishment of a custom-house at Kyakhta in 1728 diverted this trade into a new channel. But Nerchinsk acquired fresh importance from the influx of immigrants, mostly exiles, into eastern Dauria, from the discovery of rich mines and from the arrival of great numbers of convicts to the Nerchinsk katorga. Ultimately Nerchinsk became the chief town of Transbaikalia.

The famous English adventurer and engineer Samuel Bentham visited Nerchinsk in 1782. Bentham had seen a potential for Nerchinsk as a base for access to the Sea of Okhotsk, provided the Chinese would authorize navigation on the Amur River. Such a venture would have opened up the possibility of fur trade with the Pacific Ocean, as far as the Chinese port of Canton.

In 1812, Nerchinsk was transferred from the banks of the Shilka to its present site, on account of floods. The town relinquished its supremacy to Chita in the late 19th century, when the Trans-Siberian Railway bypassed it.

According to George Kennan, "a few of the Decembrist conspirators of 1825" and "thousands of Polish insurgents" from their unsuccessful insurrection of 1863" were transported to the Nerchinsk silver-mining district. The Decembrist prisoners included some 100 nobles who were made to work in the silver mines.

=== 20th century ===
In the early 20th century, Nerchinsk was built of wood, and its lower areas frequently suffered from inundations. The inhabitants supported themselves mainly by agriculture, tobacco-growing and cattle-breeding; a few merchants traded in furs and cattle, in brick-tea from China, and in manufactured wares from Russia. Gold-mines in the vicinity were owned and developed by the Butin family of merchants, whose Neo-Moorish Butin palace is now accessible for visitors as a local museum. The palace includes several largest mirrors which were purchased at the 1878 Paris World Fair and were at the time the largest in the world, being subsequently transported to the palace from France.

== Nerchinsk today ==
As of 2016 Nerchinsk is home to some small electromechanical and food-processing industries. It has a small museum, established in 1884. Among its sights are the Resurrection Cathedral, built in the Neoclassical style in 1825 to commemorate the city's relocation, its belltower destroyed by the Communists. The site of old Nerchinsk is marked by the Assumption Monastery, the oldest in Dauria, founded in 1664. Its cathedral, consecrated in 1712, is the easternmost building in the Muscovite Baroque style.

== Administrative and municipal status ==
Within the framework of administrative divisions, Nerchinsk serves as the administrative center of Nerchinsky District, to which it is directly subordinated. As a municipal division, the town of Nerchinsk, together with one rural locality (the selo of Makeyevka), is incorporated within Nerchinsky Municipal District as Nerchinskoye Urban Settlement.

== Transportation ==
Nerchinsk
- IATA: none; ICAO: none

Summary
- Airport type: Military
- Operator: Russian Air Force
- Location: Nerchinsk
- Elevation AMSL: 1,575 ft (480 m)
- Coordinates: 52°0′0″N 116°32′0″E
- Interactive map of Nerchinsk

Runways
Direction	Length		Surface
Direction	ft	m	Surface
	5,577	1,700	Concrete

The Nerchinsk Airport is a former air-base located 2 kilometers (1.2 mi) northwest of the town. It was abandoned in the 1990s. The substandard runway length suggests a 1950s design.
