= July 1918 =

Month in 1918

<<	July 1918					>>
Su	Mo	Tu	We	Th	Fr	Sa
	1	2	3	4	5	6
7	8	9	10	11	12	13
14	15	16	17	18	19	20
21	22	23	24	25	26	27
28	29	30	31

The following events occurred in July 1918:

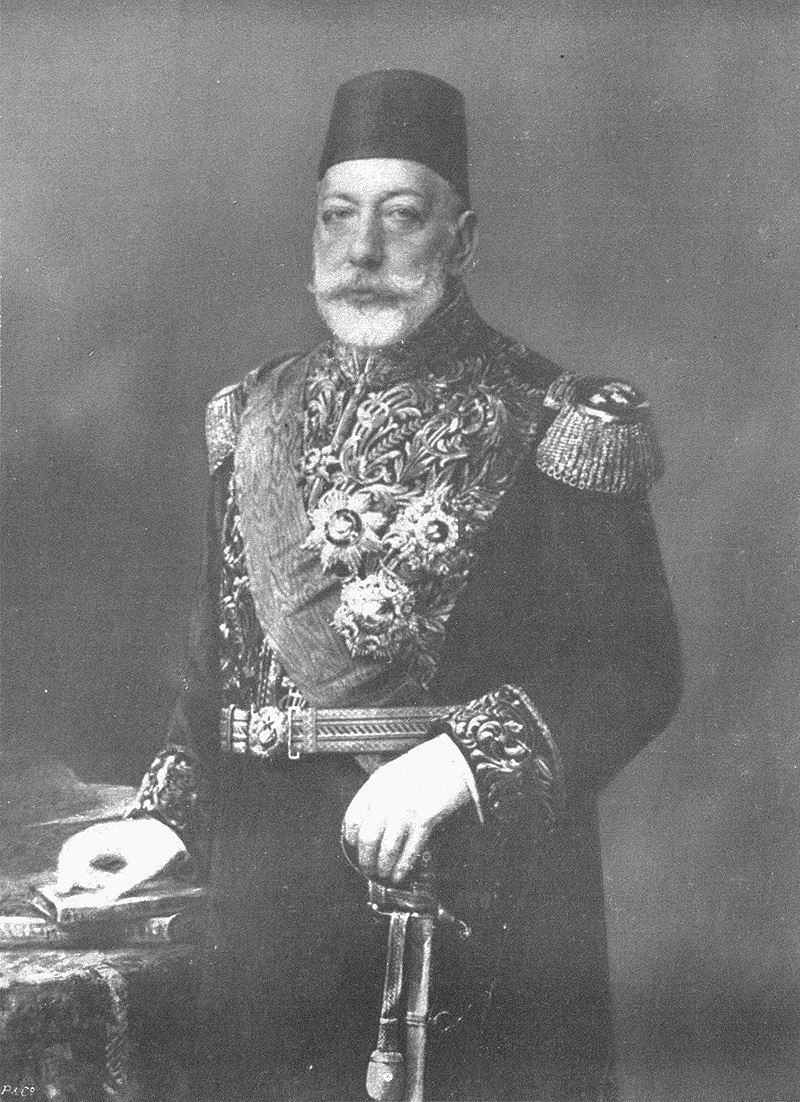
Sultan Mehmed V, dies on the Ottoman throne

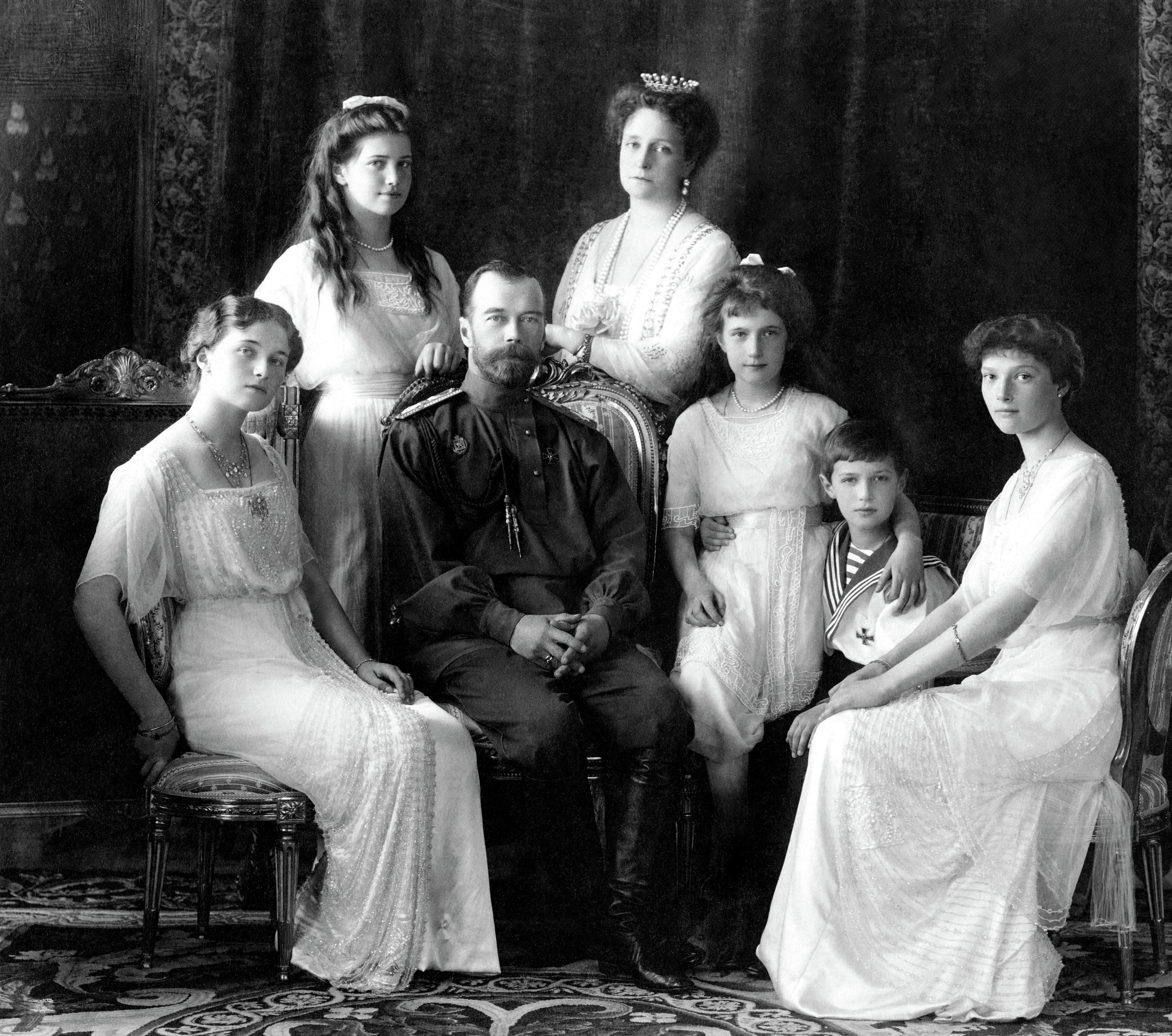
Tsar Nicholas and his entire family are murdered by the Bolsheviks.

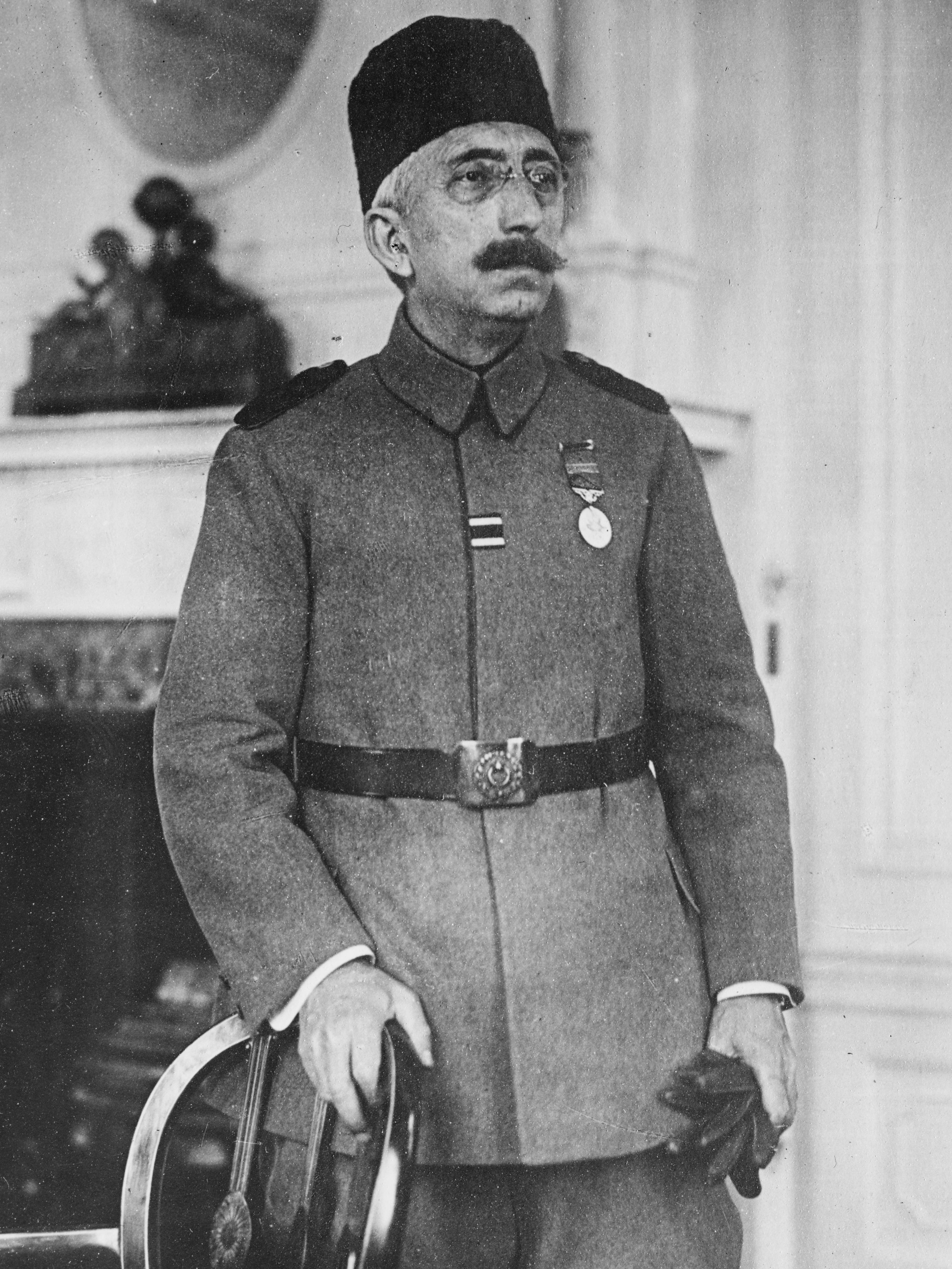
Mehmed VI, last Sultan of the Ottoman Empire

== July 1, 1918 (Monday) ==
- Eight tons of TNT exploded at a shell factory in Chilwell, Nottinghamshire, England, killing 134 people. The explosion was so great only 32 bodies were positively identified.
- French president Raymond Poincaré granted the Czechoslovak National Council a special diplomatic charter in anticipation of it becoming a governing body for an independent Czechoslovakia.
- U.S. Navy troopship USS Covington was torpedoed and sunk in the Atlantic Ocean off the coast of France by German submarine SM U-86 with the loss of six of her crew.
- The Royal Air Force established the No. 80 Wing at Serny, Pas-de-Calais, France.
- The New York City Subway added new stations to the IRT Broadway–Seventh Avenue Line, including Whitehall Street, Rector Street, Cortlandt Street, Chambers Street, Franklin Street, Canal Street, Houston Street, Christopher Street, 14th Street, 18th Street, 23rd Street, and 28th Street. As well, the Anderson–Jerome Avenues and Sedgwick Avenue stations for the IRT Ninth Avenue Line also opened.
- Japanese novelist Miekichi Suzuki published the first edition of the children's magazine Red Bird.
- Born: Ahmed Deedat, Indian-South African missionary and theologian, known for Islam missionary work in South Africa, author of The Choice: Islam and Christianity; in Tadkeshwar, British India (present-day India) (d. 2005)
- Died:
  - Charles I. D. Looff, 66, American inventor, designer of popular carnival rides such as carousels for the Santa Monica Pier (b. 1852)
  - Theodore Lukens, 69, American conservationist, noted advocate for forming forest reserves in the United States including the San Gabriel Timberland Reserve and the San Bernardino Forest Reserve (b. 1848)

== July 2, 1918 (Tuesday) ==
- A U.S. munitions factory in Split Rock, New York, caught on fire and exploded, killing at least 50 workers.
- Daily newspaper St. Thomas Times-Journal published its first edition in St. Thomas, Ontario.
- Died:
  - Washington Gladden, 82, American religious leader, noted leader in the Social Gospel and Progressive Movements in the United States (b. 1836)
  - Helen Stuart Campbell, 78, American educator and industrialist, considered the pioneer of home economics (b. 1839)

== July 3, 1918 (Wednesday) ==
- The Siberian intervention was launched by the Allies to extract the Czechoslovak Legion from the Russian Civil War.
- Lord Lieutenant of Ireland John French issued a proclamation banning Sinn Féin, the Irish Volunteers, the Gaelic League and The Irishwomen's Council.
- The Royal Air Force established air squadron No. 139.
- The New York City Subway added new stations to the BMT Jamaica Line, including 121st Street.
- The National Assembly of Azerbaijan established the state-run newspaper Azerbaijan.
- Born:
  - Benjamin Thompson, American architect, founder of Design Research; in Saint Paul, Minnesota, United States (d. 2002)
  - Ernest Vandiver, American politician, 73rd Governor of Georgia; as Samuel Ernest Vandiver Jr., in Canon, Georgia, United States (d. 2005)
- Died:
  - Benjamin Tillman, 70, American politician, 84th Governor of South Carolina, U.S. Senator from South Carolina from 1895 to 1918 (b. 1847)
  - D. A. Thomas, 62, Welsh industrialist and politician, leading developer of the coal industry in Wales, cabinet minister for the David Lloyd George administration (b. 1856)

== July 4, 1918 (Thursday) ==
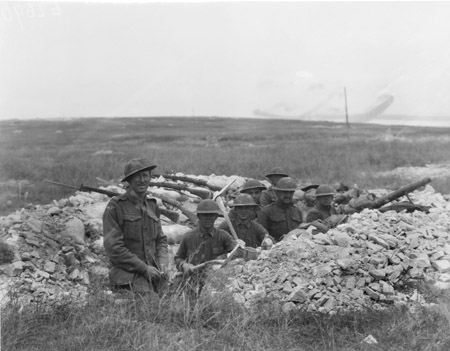
Australian and American troops dug in together during the Battle of Hamel.

- Mehmed VI succeeded as Sultan of the Ottoman Empire upon the death of his half-brother Mehmed V.
- Battle of Hamel – The Australian Corps under command of Lieutenant General John Monash captured Hamel, France in what became regarded as one of the most prepared battles of the entire war. Australian casualties were 1,400 while German casualties were 2,000 along with 1,600 captured.
- Austro-Hungarian submarine SM U-20 was torpedoed and sunk in the Adriatic Sea by an Italian submarine with the loss of all 18 crew.
- The Bristol fighter aircraft was first flown.
- In a remarkable coincidence, two sets of famous twins were born on either side of the Atlantic Ocean on the same day. The first set were the Lederer sisters in Sioux City, Iowa, who later became known as the famous advice columnists Ann Landers and Abigail Van Buren. The second were the Bedser twins Alec and Eric in Reading, Berkshire, England, who both became champion professional cricket players for the Surrey County Cricket Club.
- Born:
  - Tāufaʻāhau, Tongan noble, King of Tonga from 1965 to 2006, son of Sālote; in Nukuʻalofa, Tonga (d. 2006)
  - Ron Ritchie, Canadian economist, founder of the Institute for Research on Public Policy; as Ronald Stuart Ritchie, in Charing Cross, Ontario, Canada (d. 2007)

== July 5, 1918 (Friday) ==
- American paddle steamer Columbia capsized and sank in the Illinois River with the loss of 175 lives.
- The United States Army established the 30th and 42nd field artillery regiments at Fort Monroe, Virginia.
- The Curtiss Wasp airplane was first flown.
- South Australian Railways opened the Spalding railway line between Clare Valley and Spalding, Australia.
- Born:
  - Zakaria Mohieddin, Egyptian state leader, 33rd Prime Minister of Egypt; in Qalyubiyya Governorate, Sultanate of Egypt (present-day Egypt) (d. 2012)
  - George Rochberg, American composer, known for compositions including String Quartet No. 3 and Nach Bach; in Paterson, New Jersey, United States (d. 2005)

== July 6, 1918 (Saturday) ==
- In the Russian Civil War an uprising starts in Yaroslavl.
- The United States Army Air Service established the 1st Bombardment Wing at the Toul-Croix de Metz Airfield in France.
- The Royal Air Force established air squadron No. 255.
- The Gulfoss Tunnel opened for rail service in Melhus Municipality, Norway.
- Born:
  - Sebastian Cabot, English actor, best known for his supporting role in the CBS 1960s sitcom Family Affair and voice work in Disney films, including Bagheera in The Jungle Book and the narrator in the Winnie the Pooh series; as Charles Sebastian Thomas Cabot, in London, England (d. 1977)
  - Eugene List, American classical musician, pianist for the New York Philharmonic and noted instructor with the Eastman School of Music; in Philadelphia, United States (d. 1985)
  - Francisco Moncion, Dominican-born American principal dancer, choreographer and charter member of the New York City Ballet; in La Vega, Dominican Republic (d. 1995)
- Died: John Purroy Mitchel, 38, American politician, 95th Mayor of New York City; killed in a military plane crash (b. 1879)

== July 7, 1918 (Sunday) ==
- The United States Army established the Fifth Corps in France.
- Died:
  - Archbishop Andronik, 47, Russian clergy, Bishop of Perm and Solokamsk, Russia from 1914 to 1918; executed (b. 1870)
  - Arno Bieberstein, 34, German swimmer, gold medalist at the 1908 Summer Olympics (b. 1884)

== July 8, 1918 (Monday) ==
- The Committee Pro Catalonia was established to support the actions of the Catalan National Committee formed in Paris earlier in the year to promote the idea of Catalonia being a sovereign nation from the rest of Spain.
- The Swedish Exhibition & Congress Centre opened in Gothenburg, Sweden.
- Born: Craig Stevens, American actor, best known for the playing the title role in the Peter Gunn TV series; as Gail Shikles Jr., in Liberty, Missouri, United States (d. 2000)

== July 9, 1918 (Tuesday) ==
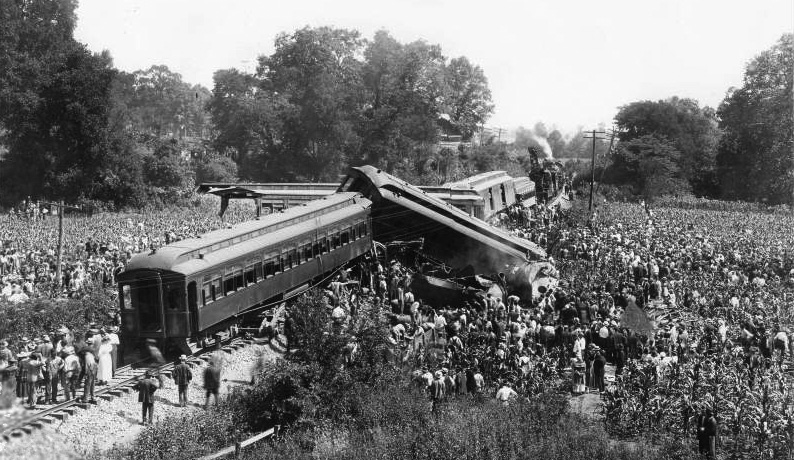
Train wreck in Nashville, Tennessee

- An inbound local train in Nashville, Tennessee collided with an outbound express, killing 101 people and injuring 171 others in what was the deadliest train accident in American history.
- British flying ace James McCudden was killed when his aircraft crashed on take-off at Auxi-le-Château, France. He had 57 victories at the time of his death, making him the seventh-highest-scoring ace of World War I.
- The Swiss electrical engineering company Anonymous Society of Sécheron Workshops was established in Geneva.
- The U.S. Army Warrant Officer Corps was established, derived from the Coastal Artillery Mine Planters service.
- The Citation Star was established by the United States Congress for Americans serving in World War I, only to be replaced in 1932 by the Silver Star.
- The football club Independiente de Tandil was established in Tandil, Argentina.
- Born:
  - Jarl Wahlström, Finnish activist, 12th General of The Salvation Army; in Helsinki, Finland (d. 1999)
  - U. G. Krishnamurti, Indian philosopher, noted critic of the concept of enlightenment; as Uppaluri Gopala Krishnamurti, in Machilipatnam, British India (present-day India) (d. 2007)
  - Nile Kinnick, American football player, halfback for the Adel and Omaha Benson High School Magnet football teams, recipient of the Heisman Trophy; in Adel, Iowa, United States (d. 1943, killed in a plane crash)

== July 10, 1918 (Wednesday) ==
Soviet emblem of Russia

- Russia adopted a new constitution that officially declared it a Soviet republic. The iconic Soviet emblem was released, which included the hammer and sickle wreathed in wheat (to symbolize its agricultural roots) with the red star on top. It contained the motto "Workers of the world, unite!" in the coat of arms.
- British colonial forces defeated Egba rebels in Nigeria. The fighting cost 600 lives and lead to heavy taxation and forced labor policies in the African region until 1925.
- The Denver and Interurban Railroad in Colorado ceased all operations as passenger service was replaced with buses.
- Born:
  - Chuck Stevens, American baseball player, first baseman for the Cleveland Browns from 1941 to 1948; as Charles Augustus Stevens, Jr., in Colfax County, New Mexico, United States (d. 2018)
  - James Aldridge, Australian journalist and writer, author of The Sea Eagle and The Diplomat; as Harold Edward James Aldridge, in White Hills, Victoria, Australia (d. 2015)
- Died: Fay Kellogg, 47, American architect, advocated female membership into the École des Beaux-Arts, designer of the Woman's Memorial Hospital in Brooklyn, New York and the YWCA National War Council houses at military bases during World War I (b. 1871)

== July 11, 1918 (Thursday) ==
- Born:
  - Roy Krenkel, American illustrator, best known for his fantastical artwork for Weird Science and Weird Fantasy (d. 1983)
  - Venetia Burney, English educator, credited by astronomer Clyde Tombaugh for coming up with the name for the dwarf planet Pluto discovered in 1930 when she was 11 (d. 2009)

== July 12, 1918 (Friday) ==
- Haiti declared war on Germany as part of its alliance with the United States.
- Imperial Japanese Navy battleship Kawachi exploded off Tokuyama, Yamaguchi, Honshu, Japan, killing at least 621 sailors.
- Pablo Picasso married Ukrainian ballet dancer Olga Khokhlova in Paris with poets and friends Jean Cocteau and Max Jacob as witnesses.
- The United States Army established the 12th Division at Camp Devens, Massachusetts and the 100th Infantry Division at Camp Bowie, Texas.
- Born:
  - Doris Grumbach, American literary editor and writer, author of The Spoil of Flowers and Coming into the End Zone; as Doris M. Isaac, in New York City, United States (d. 2022)
  - Mary Glen-Haig, British fencer, gold medalist at the 1950 and 1954 British Empire and Commonwealth Games; as Mary Alison James, in Islington, London, England (d. 2014)
  - Daniel Aldrich, American academic, first chancellor of the University of California, Irvine; in Northwood, New Hampshire, United States (d. 1990)
- Died: George Whitefield Davis, 78, American army officer, 4th Military Governor of Puerto Rico, first Governor of the Panama Canal Zone (b. 1839)

== July 13, 1918 (Saturday) ==
- Born:
  - Alberto Ascari, Italian race car driver, two-time Formula One Champion; in Milan, Kingdom of Italy (present-day Italy) (d. 1955)
  - Heinrich Bartels, Austrian air force officer, commander of various air squadrons for the Luftwaffe during World War II including Jagdgeschwader 5, recipient of the Knight's Cross of the Iron Cross; in Linz, Austria-Hungary (present-day Austria) (d. 1944, killed in action)
- Died: Lord Edward Cecil, 51, British army officer, best known for his collaborative efforts with Herbert Kitchener and Robert Baden-Powell during the Second Boer War (b. 1867)

== July 14, 1918 (Sunday) ==
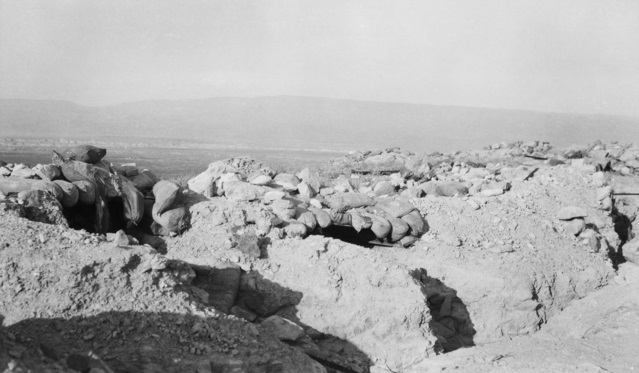
Turkish defenders at the Battle of Abu Tellul.

- Battle of Abu Tellul – British and Indian forces combined to repel Ottoman forces at Abu Tellul, Palestine, in what turned out to the last major offense by the Central Powers in the Middle East. Between 425 and 540 Ottoman soldiers were captured, with another 105 killed. The British forces sustained 183 casualties.
- French passenger ship Djemnah was torpedoed and sunk in the Mediterranean Sea of the coast off Libya by German submarine SM UB-105 with the loss of 436 of the 754 passengers and crew on board.
- The Mensheviks and Socialist Revolutionary Party established the Transcaspian Government in Tashkent (now Uzbekistan).
- German submarine SM UC-77 struck a mine and sank in the North Sea off the coast of West Flanders, Belgium.
- American pilot Quentin Roosevelt, the youngest son of former U.S. President Theodore Roosevelt, was shot down and killed by a German fighter over Chamery, France while on a mission with the 95th Aero Squadron.
- The Royal Air Force established air squadron No. 157.
- The association football league Federação Norte-rio-grandense de Futebol was established to manage all football tournaments in Rio Grande do Norte, Brazil.
- Mammy Lou, the oldest person ever to star in a film at the claimed age of 114, appeared in the film drama The Glorious Adventure.
- Born:
  - Ingmar Bergman, Swedish film director, best known for his acclaimed international films including The Seventh Seal, Wild Strawberries, Persona, Cries and Whispers, and Fanny and Alexander, three-time recipient of the Academy Award for Best Foreign Language Film; as Ernst Ingmar Bergman, in Uppsala, Sweden (d. 2007)
  - Jay Wright Forrester, American computer engineer, developer of system dynamics; in Anselmo, Nebraska, United States (d. 2016)
  - Egmont Prinz zur Lippe-Weißenfeld, Austrian air force officer, commander of several Nachtjagdgeschwader (Night Raider) squadrons for the Luftwaffe during World War II, recipient of the Knight's Cross of the Iron Cross; in Salzburg, Austria-Hungary (present-day Austria) (d. 1944, killed in action)
- Died:
  - Samuel Farr, 90-91, English-New Zealand architect, designed many landmarks in Christchurch including Cranmer Court and Christchurch Central City (b. 1827)
  - Paul Cinquevalli, 59, German performer, noted juggler for the English music hall scene (b. 1859)

== July 15, 1918 (Monday) ==
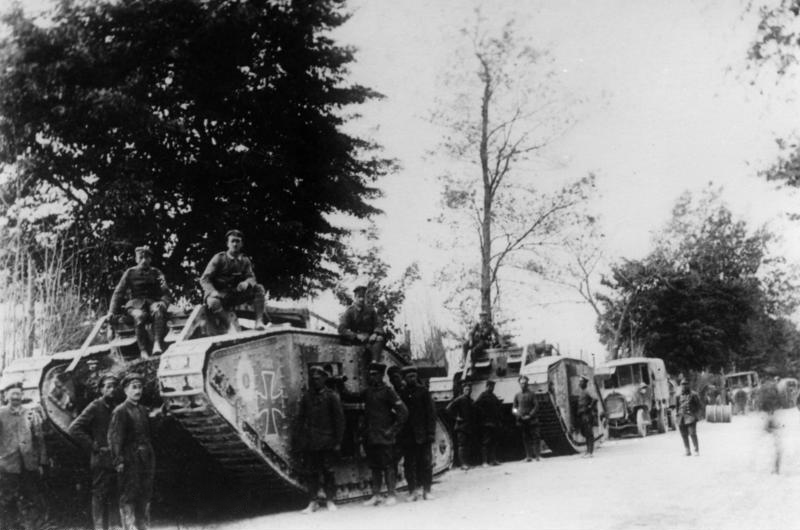
Captured British Mark tanks used by German troops during the Second Battle of the Marne.

- Second Battle of the Marne – Germany launched a major offensive against the Allies on the Western Front, with 52 German divisions attacking 44 French divisions east and west of Reims, France. The French were supported by eight American divisions, four British divisions, and two Italian divisions in the battle. On the first day, German forces managed to secure a strategic crossing over the Marne river at Dormans.
- Rationing was introduced for butter, margarine, lard, meat, and sugar in the United Kingdom.
- RAF Driffield was established west of Driffield, England.
- The Atchison, Topeka and Santa Fe Railway opened a new train station in San Bernardino, California, to replace the former California Southern Railroad station that was destroyed by fire in 1916.
- The Vancouver Police Union was established as the second unionized police force in Canada.
- Paramount Pictures released the film adaptation of Uncle Tom's Cabin with young actor Marguerite Clark playing two of the child characters from the Harriet Beecher Stowe novel. The film is now considered lost.
- Born:
  - Bertram Brockhouse, Canadian physicist, recipient of the Nobel Prize in Physics for the development of the neutron spectroscopy used to study matter; in Lethbridge, Alberta, Canada (d. 2003)
  - Brenda Milner, British-Canadian medical psychologist, credited as the founder of neuropsychology; as Brenda Langford, in Manchester, England

== July 16, 1918 (Tuesday) ==
- General Wilfrid Malleson led a British-Indian force of 950 men to Turkestan to counter the Soviet presence in the region and any threat against British India and Persia.
- The Mensheviks-supported daily newspaper New Life ceased publication in Petrograd.
- Born:
  - Paul Farnes, British fighter pilot, one of "The Few" surviving pilots of the Battle of Britain, recipient of the Distinguished Flying Medal; in Boscombe, England (d. 2020)
  - John Frost, South African air force officer, commander of the 3rd and 5th South African Air Force Squadrons during World War II, recipient of the Distinguished Flying Cross; in Queenstown, Union of South Africa (present-day South Africa) (d. 1942, missing in action)
  - Leonard T. Schroeder, American army officer, first American soldier to land at Utah Beach on D-Day, recipient of the Silver Star and Bronze Star Medal; in Linthicum, Maryland, United States (d. 2009)
  - John Robert Baldwin, British air force officer, commander of air squadrons No. 146 and No. 198 during World War II, recipient of the Distinguished Service Order, Distinguished Flying Cross from both the United Kingdom and the United States, Air Force Cross, the Croix de guerre from Belgium, and the Order of Orange-Nassau from the Netherlands; in Bath, Somerset, England (d. 1952, killed in action during the Korean War)
  - George Mueller, American space engineer, associate manager of the Apollo program and Project Gemini from 1963 to 1969; in St. Louis, United States (d. 2015)
  - Bayani Casimiro, Filipino dancer and actor, credited as the "Fred Astaire of the Philippines"; in San Pablo, Laguna, Philippine Islands (present-day Philippines) (d. 1989)
  - Samuel Victor Perry, British chemist and rugby player, noted for his research into muscle biochemistry, member of the England national rugby union team from 1947 to 1948, in Isle of Wight, England (d. 2009)
  - Müzeyyen Senar, Turkish singer, promoter of classical Ottoman music; as Zeliha Eren, in Gököz, Keles, Ottoman Empire (present-day Turkey) (d. 2015)
- Died:
  - José de Diego, 52, Puerto Rican revolutionary leader and poet, leading figure of the independence movement in Puerto Rico (b. 1866)
  - Lionel Ashfield, 19, British air force officer, member of the No. 202 Squadron, recipient of the Distinguished Flying Cross; killed in action (b. 1898)

== July 17, 1918 (Wednesday) ==
- By order of the Bolshevik Party and carried out by the Cheka, former tsar Nicholas II of Russia and his wife Alexandra Feodorovna were shot dead at the Ipatiev House in Ekaterinburg, Russia. Also murdered were their children Olga, Tatiana, Maria, Anastasia, and Alexei. The royal family's physician Eugene Botkin, maid Anna Demidova, footman Alexei Trupp, and cook Ivan Kharitonov were also killed.
- Second Battle of the Marne – Counteroffensives near Reims, France stalled the German offensive.
- British ocean liner RMS Carpathia, famed for rescuing survivors of the Titanic, was torpedoed and sunk off the east coast of Ireland by German submarine U-55, with 218 of the 223 passengers and crew on board rescued.
- The United States Army established the 13th Division at Camp Lewis, Washington.
- The Communist Party of Ukraine was established.
- The New York City Subway opened the IRT Lexington Avenue Line, with stations including 42nd Street, 51st Street, 59th Street, 68th Street, 77th Street, 86th Street, 96th Street, 103rd Street, 110th Street, 116th Street, and 125th Street. As well, the 138th station for the IRT Jerome Avenue Line opened.
- Japanese chemical manufacturer Teijin was established in Osaka.
- The Roman Catholic Diocese of Luz was established in Luz, Brazil.
- Born:
  - Geoffrey Lane, British judge, 12th Lord Chief Justice of England and Wales; in Derby, England (d. 2005)
  - Carlos Manuel Arana Osorio, Guatemalan state leader, 24th President of Guatemala; in Barberena, Guatemala (d. 2003)
  - Chandler Robbins, American biologist, organizer of the North American Breeding Bird Survey, author of Birds of North America: A Guide to Field Identification; in Belmont, Massachusetts, United States (d. 2017)
  - Abdullah Tal, Arab military leader, noted Arab Legion commander during the Battle for Jerusalem in 1948; in Irbid, Ottoman Empire (present-day Jordan) (d. 1973)

== July 18, 1918 (Thursday) ==
- Battle of Soissons – French commander Ferdinand Foch ordered 24 French divisions, supported by British and American divisions and 478 tanks, to counterattack German forces around Soissons, France.
- Battle of Château-Thierry – American forces successfully drove the Germans out of Château-Thierry, France at a cost of 1,908 casualties, while inflicting 5,328 German casualties.
- Agents with Cheka executed several Russian nobles related to the Romanov family in Alapayevsk, Russia including princes and brothers Constantine, Igor and John, Grand Duke Sergei Mikhailovich, Grand Duchess Elizabeth Feodorovna, Vladimir Paley and Sister Barbara Yakovleva, the Martyrs of Alapayevsk, by throwing them down a mineshaft.
- Born: Nelson Mandela, South African state leader, 1st President of South Africa, recipient of the Nobel Peace Prize for opposing and eventually dissolving apartheid in South Africa, author of Long Walk to Freedom; as Rolihlahla Mandela, in Mvezo, Union of South Africa (present-day South Africa) (d. 2013)
- Died: George Dilboy, 22, American soldier, member of the 103rd Infantry Regiment, recipient of the Medal of Honor; killed in action (b. 1896)

== July 19, 1918 (Friday) ==
- Honduras declared war on Germany as part of its alliance with the United States.
- Second Battle of the Marne – German inflicted heavy casualties on the Italian Corps at Tardenois, France, with the Italians losing 9,334 out of a force of 24,000 men. However, British reinforcements from the 51st and 62nd Divisions arrived to plug a gap in defenses at Ardre Valley and saved the Allied line from collapsing.
- Seven Royal Air Force Sopwith Camel airplanes from the Royal Navy aircraft carrier HMS Furious attacked the Imperial German Navy airship base at Tondern, Germany, destroying two Zeppelin airships. It was the first time an air attack using convention land planes occurred using an aircraft carrier and the most successful attack by shipboard aircraft of World War I.
- French passenger ship SS Australien was sunk in the Mediterranean Sea by German submarine SM UC-54, killing 20 of her 968 passengers and crew.
- U.S. Navy cruiser USS San Diego struck a mine and sank in the Atlantic Ocean with the loss of six crew.
- German submarine SM UB-110 was depth charged, rammed and sunk in the North Sea by Royal Navy ship HMS Garry with the loss of 13 crew.
- The animated news short The Sinking of the Lusitania by cartoonist Winsor McCay that depicted the attack and sinking of the RMS Lusitania went into wide release.

== July 20, 1918 (Saturday) ==
- Battle of Soissons – The French and American counteroffensive broke the German advance and forced them back, recovering most of the ground lost in the Spring Offensive.
- Royal Navy submarine HMS E34 struck a mine and sank off the coast of the Netherlands with the loss of all 30 crew.
- Royal Navy troopship Justicia, already damaged by torpedo from German submarine SM UB-64 the previous day, was torpedoed while at anchor in Lough Swilly, Ireland by German submarine SM UB-124, killing 16 of her crew.
- Born: Sergei Scherbakov, Russian boxer, silver medalist at the 1952 Summer Olympics; in Moscow, Russian SFSR (present-day Russia) (d. 1994)

== July 21, 1918 (Sunday) ==
- Attack on Orleans – German submarine SM U-156 surfaced and fired on the seacoast town of Orleans, Massachusetts, but was driven off by two U.S. Navy seaplanes from the Naval Air Station Chatham in Chatham, Massachusetts.
- German submarine SM UB-124 was scuttled after being damaged by depth charges in the Atlantic Ocean off the coast of Ireland.
- Died: Francis Lupo, 23, American soldier, longest U.S. enlisted man to be missing in action (remains were discovered in 2003 and repatriated in 2006) (b. 1895)

== July 22, 1918 (Monday) ==
- Battle of Soissons – German commander Erich Ludendorff ordered the German line to be reorganized from Ourcq to Marfaux, France to prevent the Allies from breaking through, ending most of the fighting around Soissons.
- Spain established Picos de Europa National Park, the first national park in the country, around the Lakes of Covadonga in the Picos de Europa mountain range. It was followed soon after with Ordesa y Monte Perdido National Park in the Pyrenees mountain range.
- The 1st and 2nd Mounted Divisions of the Egyptian Expeditionary Force were renumbered the 4th and 5th Cavalry Divisions. As well, the 10th, 11th and 12th Cavalry Brigades for renumbered for the 4th Division and the 13th, 14th and 15th Cavalry Brigades for the 5th Division.
- The Fowler Airplane Corporation relocated its offices and manufacturing plant in San Francisco, following a massive fire that destroyed its original factory in May.
- The Cranbrook School in Sydney was established as a boys only school headed by Frederick Perkins.
- Victor Records released the Marion Harris single "After You've Gone", which became a staple for many artists including Bessie Smith, Louis Armstrong, Bing Crosby, Al Jolson, Judy Garland, Ella Fitzgerald, Dinah Washington and Frank Sinatra.
- The play Friendly Enemies by Aaron Hoffman held its Broadway premier at Hudson Theatre in New York City.
- Died:
  - Indra Lal Roy, 19, Indian air force officer, first Indian member of the Royal Air Force, recipient of the Distinguished Flying Cross; killed in action (b. 1898)
  - Manuel González Prada, 74, Peruvian writer and activist, leading social reformer and promoter of modernism in Peru (b. 1844)

== July 23, 1918 (Tuesday) ==
- A protest in Uozu, Toyama, Japan by farmers over inflated rice prices escalated into a riot that spread to other farming communities across Japan. The unrest lasted for two months, with 417 reported disputes involving more than 66,000 workers, that eventually lead to the collapse of the government under Terauchi Masatake. In all, some 25,000 persons were arrested and 8,200 charged and convicted for various crimes.
- The United States Army established the 393rd, 394th, and 395th Infantry Regiments.
- Born: Pee Wee Reese, American baseball player, shortstop for the Brooklyn and Los Angeles Dodgers from 1940 to 1958; as Harold Peter Henry Reese, in Ekron, Kentucky, United States (d. 1999)

== July 24, 1918 (Wednesday) ==
- The Northern Dvina Governorate was established in Russia.
- The cornerstone of the Hebrew University of Jerusalem was laid with the campus completed and opened in 1925, making it the second oldest post-secondary education institution in Israel.
- Weekly newspaper The Leader published its first edition for Angaston, Australia.
- Born:
  - Antonio Candido, Brazilian literary critic and writer, co-founder of the literary magazine Clima; as Antonio Candido de Mello e Souza, in Rio de Janeiro, Brazil (d. 2017)
  - Ruggiero Ricci, American classical musician, noted for violin performances and recordings of Niccolò Paganini; in San Bruno, California, United States (d. 2012)

== July 25, 1918 (Thursday) ==
- The Royal Air Force established air squadrons No. 244, No. 258, No. 260, and No. 272.
- The Passing Show of 1918, a Broadway musical revue by Harold R. Atteridge with music by Sigmund Romberg and Jean Schwartz, opened at Winter Garden Theatre in New York City. The revue featured famous song standards including "I'm Forever Blowing Bubbles" and "Smiles".
- Born:
  - Jane Frank, American artist, leading creator of aerial landscape art; as Jane Babette Schenthal, in Baltimore, United States (d. 1986)
  - Alexander McKee, British journalist and deep sea explorer, discoverer of the Mary Rose; in Ipswich, England (d. 1992)
  - Jay Zeamer Jr., American air force officer, commander of the 63rd Bombardment Squadron during World War II, recipient of the Medal of Honor, two-time recipient of the Distinguished Flying Cross, Air Medal, and Silver Star; in Carlisle, Pennsylvania, United States (d. 2007)
- Died:
  - Richard Travis, 34, New Zealand soldier, recipient of the Victoria Cross, Military Medal, Distinguished Conduct Medal, and Croix de guerre for action in Gallipoli campaign and Battle of the Somme; killed in action at Couin, France (b. 1884)
  - Walter Rauschenbusch, 56, American theologian, leading figure of the Social Gospel and Georgism movements in the United States (b. 1861)

== July 26, 1918 (Friday) ==
- A coup d'état overthrew the Bolshevik government in Baku, Azerbaijan and lead to the formation of the Centrocaspian Dictatorship.
- British flying ace Mick Mannock was killed when his plane was hit by enemy ground fire while on a mission over France. His body was never recovered. He was awarded the Victoria Cross posthumously with 61 victories to his credit.
- Born:
  - Marjorie Lord, American actress, female lead in The Danny Thomas Show; as Marjorie Wollenberg, in San Francisco, United States (d. 2015)
  - Richard Blackburn, Australian judge, Chief Justice of the Supreme Court of the Australian Capital Territory from 1977 to 1984, recipient of the Order of the British Empire; in Mount Lofty, Australia (d. 1987)
- Died: Henry Macintosh, 26, British runner, gold medalist in the 1912 Summer Olympics; killed in action (b. 1892)

== July 27, 1918 (Saturday) ==
- Second Battle of the Marne – German forces reorganized behind Fère-en-Tardenois and built an alternate rail to supply the line, allowing them also to retain Soissons, France despite ongoing Allied assaults.
- British-Canadian labor and anti-conscription activist Albert Goodwin was shot dead outside Cumberland, British Columbia, following a police manhunt to capture him and others evading conscription. A former police officer and member of the arrest party claimed to have killed in him in self defense, and charges of manslaughter were subsequently dismissed due to the lack of witnesses. Goodwin's popularity among the labor movement in British Columbia led to calls of protest and general strike the following month in Vancouver.
- The Catholic University of Lublin was established in Lublin, Poland, after Vladimir Lenin allowed the Catholic Church in Poland to transfer the library and equipment from the defunct Saint Petersburg Roman Catholic Theological Academy. The university was later renamed after Pope John Paul II, who was an alumnus.
- Born: Leonard Rose, American classical musician, cellist for the New York Philharmonic and noted instructor for the Juilliard School and Curtis Institute of Music; in Washington, D.C., United States (d. 1984)
- Died: Lemuel Wilmarth, 82, American painter, founder of the Art Students League of New York and noted instructor for the National Academy of Design (b. 1835)

== July 28, 1918 (Sunday) ==
- Elections were held in Luxembourg for the 53 seats in the constitutional assembly.
- Royal Navy troopship Hyperia was torpedoed and sunk in the Mediterranean Sea off the coast of Egypt by German submarine SM UB-51 with the loss of 65 lives.
- The Serbian flag is raised alongside the American flag on the White House, at the suggestion of Serbian Inventor Mihajlo Pupin to symbolize American solidarity with Serbia in World War I. This is the only time a foreign flag was flown on the White House besides the French flag on Bastille Day, 1920.
- Born: Penaia Ganilau, Fijian state leader, first President of Fiji; in Taveuni, Fiji (d. 1993)

== July 29, 1918 (Monday) ==
- Born: Edwin O'Connor, American novelist, recipient of the Pulitzer Prize for Fiction for the novel The Edge of Sadness; in Providence, Rhode Island, United States (d. 1968)
- Died:
  - George Fell, 69, American surgeon and inventor, designer of the first artificial ventilator and the first electric chair (b. 1849)
  - R. J. Reynolds, 68, American business leader, founder of R. J. Reynolds Tobacco Company (b. 1850)

== July 30, 1918 (Tuesday) ==
- The Islamic Army of the Caucasus sent troops to counter the forming Centrocaspian Dictatorship in Baku, Azerbaijan, forcing British forces under command of Lionel Dunsterville to send Allied troops to the city.
- Boris Donskoy, a member of the Left Socialist-Revolutionaries, assassinated German Field Marshal Hermann von Eichhorn in Kiev by throwing at bomb at his vehicle. Donskoy was arrested on-scene and confessed he was ordered by political party leaders to prevent von Eichhorn from undermining revolutionary change in Ukraine and bringing to power the Hetman of Ukraine as the governing body of the country. He was executed on August 10.
- Lieutenant Frank Linke-Crawford, the fourth-highest-scoring flying ace for Austria-Hungary, was shot down and killed in aerial combat. He had scored 27 victories.
- The 1st Marine Aviation Force arrived at Brest, France, becoming the first United States Marine Corps aviation force to serve in combat.
- The United States Army Air Service established the 3rd Pursuit Group at the Vaucouleurs Aerodrome in France.
- The Royal Air Force established air squadron No. 273.
- Cook County, Georgia, named after Confederate States Army General Philip Cook, was established with the county seat in Adel.
- Born: Henri Chammartin, Swiss equestrian, gold medalist at the 1964 Summer Olympics (d. 2011)
- Died: Joyce Kilmer, 31, American journalist and poet, known for his collection Trees and Other Poems; killed in action (b. 1886)

== July 31, 1918 (Wednesday) ==
- A Royal Air Force bombing raid over Germany involving a dozen Airco planes ended in disaster, with 10 of the aircraft shot down.
- British pilot Stewart Culley took off in a Sopwith Camel from a lighter towed barge behind a British warship, the first time a feat was undertaken.
- Born:
  - Paul D. Boyer, American chemist, recipient of the Nobel Prize in Chemistry for research in the ATP synthase; in Provo, Utah, United States (d. 2018)
  - Mustapha Harun, Malaysian politician, first Governor of Sabah; in Kudat, North Borneo (present-day Malaysia) (d. 1995)
  - Alan Rawlinson, Australian air force officer, commander of the No. 79 Squadron during World War II, recipient of the Order of the British Empire, Distinguished Flying Cross, and Air Force Cross; in Fremantle, Australia (d. 2007)
  - Göthe Hedlund, Swedish speed skater, bronze medalist at the 1948 Winter Olympics; in Orkesta, Sweden (d. 2003)
  - Robert K. Morgan, American air force officer, commander of bombers Memphis Belle and Dauntless Dotty during World War II; in Asheville, North Carolina, United States (d. 2004)
  - Hank Jones, American jazz pianist, known for his collaborations with Cannonball Adderley, Ella Fitzgerald, Charlie Parker, and Salena Jones; as Henry Jones Jr., in Vicksburg, Mississippi, United States (d. 2010)
- Died:
  - George McElroy, 25, British air force officer, recipient of the Distinguished Flying Cross and Military Cross; killed in action (b. 1893)
  - Henry Suter, 77, Swiss-New Zealand biologist, leading researcher of mollusks in New Zealand (b. 1841)
