= August 1918 =

Month in 1918

<<	August 1918					>>
Su	Mo	Tu	We	Th	Fr	Sa
				1	2	3
4	5	6	7	8	9	10
11	12	13	14	15	16	17
18	19	20	21	22	23	24
25	26	27	28	29	30	31

The following events occurred in August 1918:

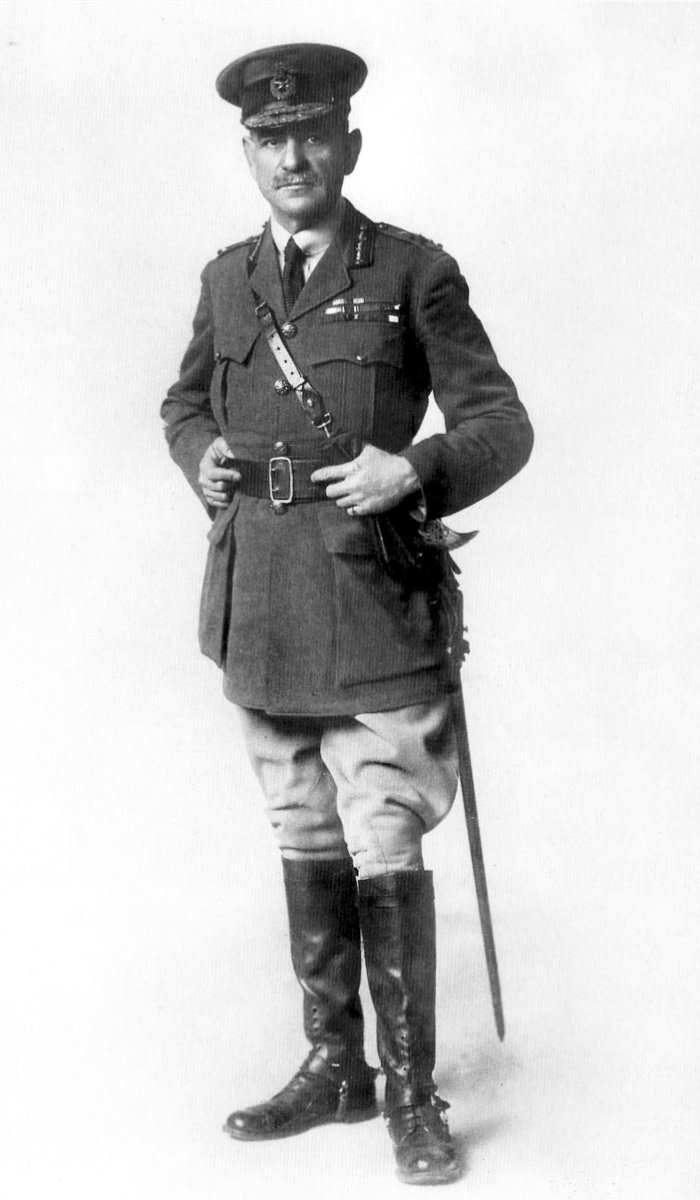
Australian General John Monash received a knighthood on the battlefield in France.

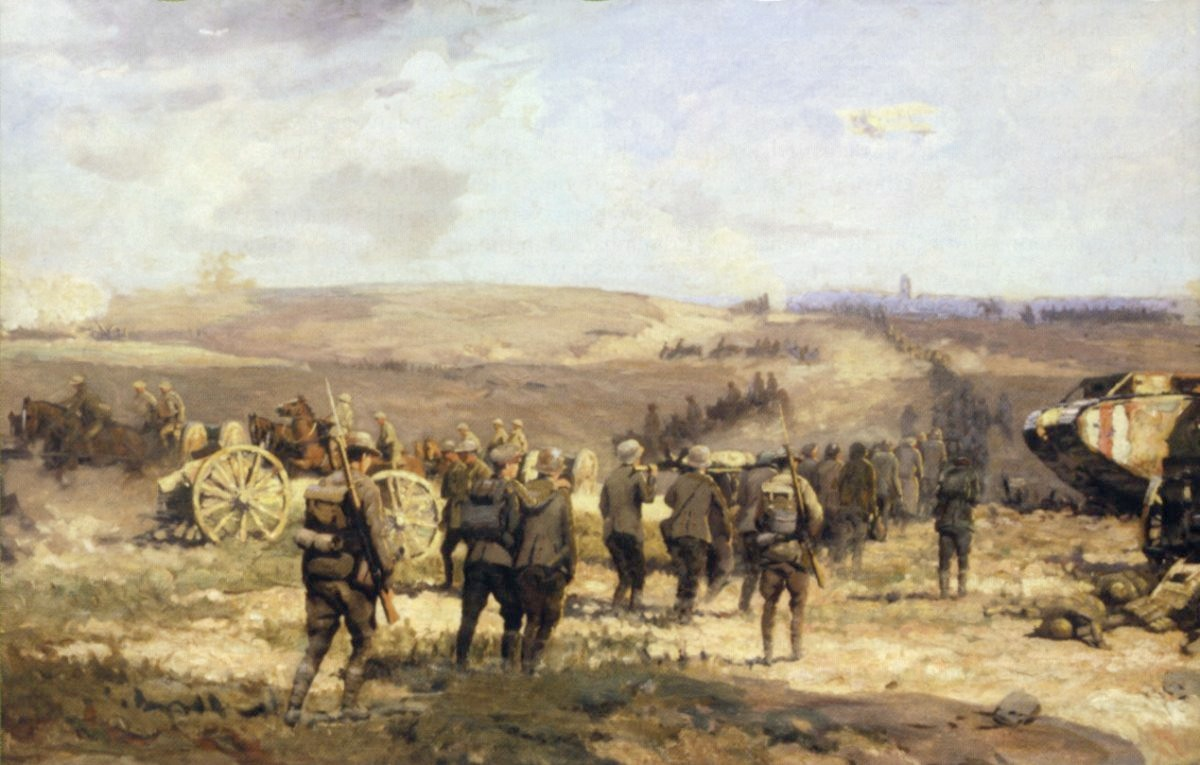
Painting by Will Longstaff depicting German prisoners of war on the first day of the Battle of Amiens.

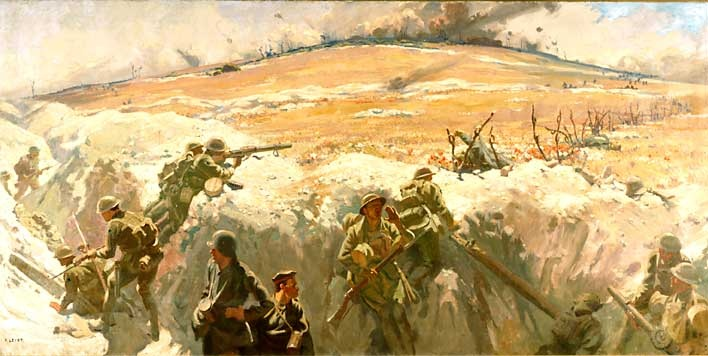
Painting by Fred Leist Australian troops capturing Mont Saint-Quentin, France in battle.

== August 1, 1918 (Thursday) ==
- Second Battle of the Marne – The French Tenth Army launched an attack against Germany defenses and were able to penetrate 5 miles (8.0 km) into German-held territory.
- North Russia intervention – Royal Navy Fairey Campania seaplanes from the seaplane tender HMS Nairana joined Allied ground forces in driving Bolshevik troops from the mouth of the Northern Dvina river in Russia in the first fully combined air, sea, and land military operation in history.
- A military dictatorship was established in Mughan region of Azerbaijan in opposition to the country's move to independence in May. It became a Soviet republic in 1919 following a Bolshevik uprising.
- French flying ace Gabriel Guérin was killed in action. His 23 victories tied him with fellow pilot René Dorme for ninth-highest-scoring French ace of World War I.
- Disabled Canadian war veteran Claude Cludernay was ejected from the Greek-owned White City Café in Toronto for being drunk and disorderly and striking a waiter. Rumors of alleged mistreatment of a war veteran spread throughout the city, leading to rioting.
- The New York City Subway system opened the IRT Pelham Line starting with 138th Street, the original and oldest station of the Pelham Line.
- The film comedy-drama Mickey, starring Mabel Normand and directed by F. Richard Jones, was released in August and became the highest-grossing movie of the year with $8 million in ticket sales worldwide.
- Born:
  - D. Djajakusuma, Indonesian filmmaker, known for films including Six Hours in Yogya and Whips of Fire; in Temanggung Regency, Java, Dutch East Indies (d. 1987)
  - T. J. Jemison, American religious leader, president of the National Baptist Convention from 1982 to 1994; in Selma, Alabama (d. 2013)
- Died: John Riley Banister, 64, American law enforcer, noted Texas Ranger and Treasury Agent (b. 1854)

== August 2, 1918 (Friday) ==
- North Russia intervention – Anti-Bolshevik forces supported by the British occupied Arkhangelsk, Russia where the Northern Regional Government was established.
- While on a mine-laying mission in the Heligoland Bight, Royal Navy destroyers HMS Ariel and HMS Vehement both struck mines. The Ariel sank with 49 of her 70 crew lost while the Vehement remained afloat despite an explosion killing 48 of her crew. Attempts were made to tow the crippled vessel back to shore but after its engines gave out, the destroyer was scuttled.
- The first general strike in Canada occurred in Vancouver in a one-day protest over the shooting death of labor activist Albert Goodwin on July 27.
- Canadian World War I veterans led crowds estimated between 5,000 and 20,000 people to vandalize and loot Greek businesses in downtown Toronto against the perceived mistreatment of a disabled Canadian veteran the previous day at a Greek-owned restaurant. Because police resources were too small to deal with the size of the unrest, Mayor Thomas Langton Church invoked the Riot Act to allow the Canadian military authority to send militias into the city and regain order.
- French submarine Floréal accidentally collided with a Royal Navy steamship and sank in the Aegean Sea.
- The Catholic Church established the Diocese of Garanhuns and Diocese of Nazaré in Olinda e Recife, Brazil.
- The 42nd Infantry Division of the United States Army created a temporary war cemetery near Fère-en-Tardenois, France, which later lead to the permanent establishment of the Oise-Aisne American Cemetery and Memorial.
- Born: Jim Delligatti, American entrepreneur, creator of the Big Mac for McDonald's; in Uniontown, Pennsylvania (d. 2016)

== August 3, 1918 (Saturday) ==
- In an attempt to overturn a string of military defeats in June and July on the Western Front, the Imperial German Army launched an attack on the commune of Fismes, France that was occupied by the U.S. Army's 32nd Infantry Division. The unit suffered 2,000 casualties during the first two days of fighting before they were relieved by the 28th Infantry Division.
- Australian hospital ship HMAT Warilda was torpedoed and sunk in the English Channel by German submarine SM UC-49 with the loss of 123 of the 801 people on board.
- Canadian militia clashed with rioters targeting Greek businesses in downtown Toronto, with an estimated 50,000 on both sides involved before the riot ended. Over 20 Greek restaurants were attacked, with damages estimated at more than $1,000,000 in 2010 values.
- German submarine SM UB-53 struck two mines and sank in the Strait of Otranto with the loss of ten of her crew.
- Australia House, Australia's high commissioner to the United Kingdom, opened in London.
- The South Sydney Rabbitohs won the New South Wales Rugby Football League premiership.
- Born:
  - Sidney Gottlieb, American intelligence officer, member of MKUltra for the CIA; in New York City (d. 1999)
  - Mihiel Gilormini, Puerto Rican air force officer, co-founder of the Puerto Rico Air National Guard, five-time recipient of the Distinguished Flying Cross, Silver Star and Air Medal; in Yauco, Puerto Rico (d. 1988)
- Died: Hugo II Logothetti, 65, Austrian noble and diplomat, last emissary for Austria-Hungary to Mesopotamia (b. 1852)

== August 4, 1918 (Sunday) ==
- The Union for the Liberation of Ukraine was established in Lemberg.
- The Party of the Right won 23 of the 53 seats in the Luxembourg elections, and were tasked with revising the constitution to democratize the country's political structure.
- Adolf Hitler was awarded a second Iron Cross on recommendation by Lieutenant Hugo Gutmann, Hitler's Jewish superior, for action during the Second Battle of the Marne.
- Born:
  - Noel Willman, Irish actor, known for film roles including The Man Who Knew Too Much, Doctor Zhivago, and The Odessa File; in Derry, Ireland (d. 1988)
  - Iceberg Slim, American writer, author of Pimp: The Story of My Life; in Chicago (d. 1992)

== August 5, 1918 (Monday) ==
- The People's Army of Komuch, a Russian anti-Bolshevik force supported by units of the Czechoslovak Legion, launched an assault on the city of Kazan, Tatarstan, Russia that was held by the Red Guards.
- Five Imperial German Navy Zeppelins attempted to bomb England in the final airship raid of the war, but most of the bomb drops fell into the North Sea by mistake due to heavy cloud cover. The missions proved even more disastrous when a Royal Air Force Airco plane piloted by Major Egbert Cadbury and crewed by Captain Robert Leckie shot down Zeppelin airship L70, killing the entire crew including Imperial German Navy Airship Division commander Peter Strasser who was on board as an observer. Strasser's death ended further airship raids on England. In total, German airships conducted 208 raids throughout the war, dropped 5,907 bombs, killed 528 people, and injured 1,156.
- Axeman of New Orleans – New Orleans resident Ed Schneider returned home late from work to find his pregnant wife had been attacked and bludgeoned. Remarkably, she survived the attack and gave birth two days later. New Orleans police began to make connections between two earlier attacks in the city, leading to suspect a serial killer.
- The first film adaption of Edith Wharton's The House of Mirth was released through Metro Pictures, with Katherine Corri Harris in the leading role and directed by Albert Capellani. The film is now considered lost.
- Born: Betty Oliphant, British Canadian arts executive, co-founder of the National Ballet of Canada; in London (d. 2004)

== August 6, 1918 (Tuesday) ==
- Second Battle of the Marne – French efforts to gain more territory from the Germans petered out, but the offensive had managed to shorten the Western Front by 28 miles (45 km).The Allies had taken 29,367 prisoners, 793 guns and 3,000 machine guns and inflicted 168,000 casualties on the Germans including 56,700 killed. Allied casualties were 95,165 killed or wounded for the French, 16,552 for the British, 12,000 for the Americans, and over 9,000 for the Italians. French commander Ferdinand Foch was made Marshal of France for his leadership of all Allied forces during the battle.
- The People's Army of Komuch attacked the north side of Kazan, Russia, forcing most of the city's Red Guards to move north and leave the south side of the city vulnerable. A Czechoslovak Legion force took advantage of this and attacked from the south, so by evening the entire city was nearly surrounded.
- North Russia intervention – The Soviet council in Murmansk issued an agreement to join the Northern Regional Government in Arkhangelsk, Russia.
- Royal Navy destroyer HMS Comet accidentally collided with another vessel while being towed and sank in the Mediterranean Sea.
- The Minneapolis, Northfield and Southern Railway was established between Minneapolis and Northfield, Minnesota.
- American United States lightship Diamond Shoal, a vessel with the United States Lighthouse Service, was torpedoed and sunk off the coast of North Carolina by German submarine SM U-140. Its shipwreck was listed on the National Register of Historic Places in 2015.

== August 7, 1918 (Wednesday) ==
- The city of Kazan, Russia fell to the People's Army of Komuch, resulting in a major victory for the White Army in the Russian Civil War.
- French Navy cruiser Dupetit-Thouars was torpedoed and sunk in the Atlantic Ocean by German submarine SM U-62, with 13 crew killed.
- The Royal Air Force established air squadron No. 154 but it was disbanded within a month due to shortage of available aircraft. The squadron number was revived in 1941.
- The Blériot-SPAD aircraft was first flown.

== August 8, 1918 (Thursday) ==
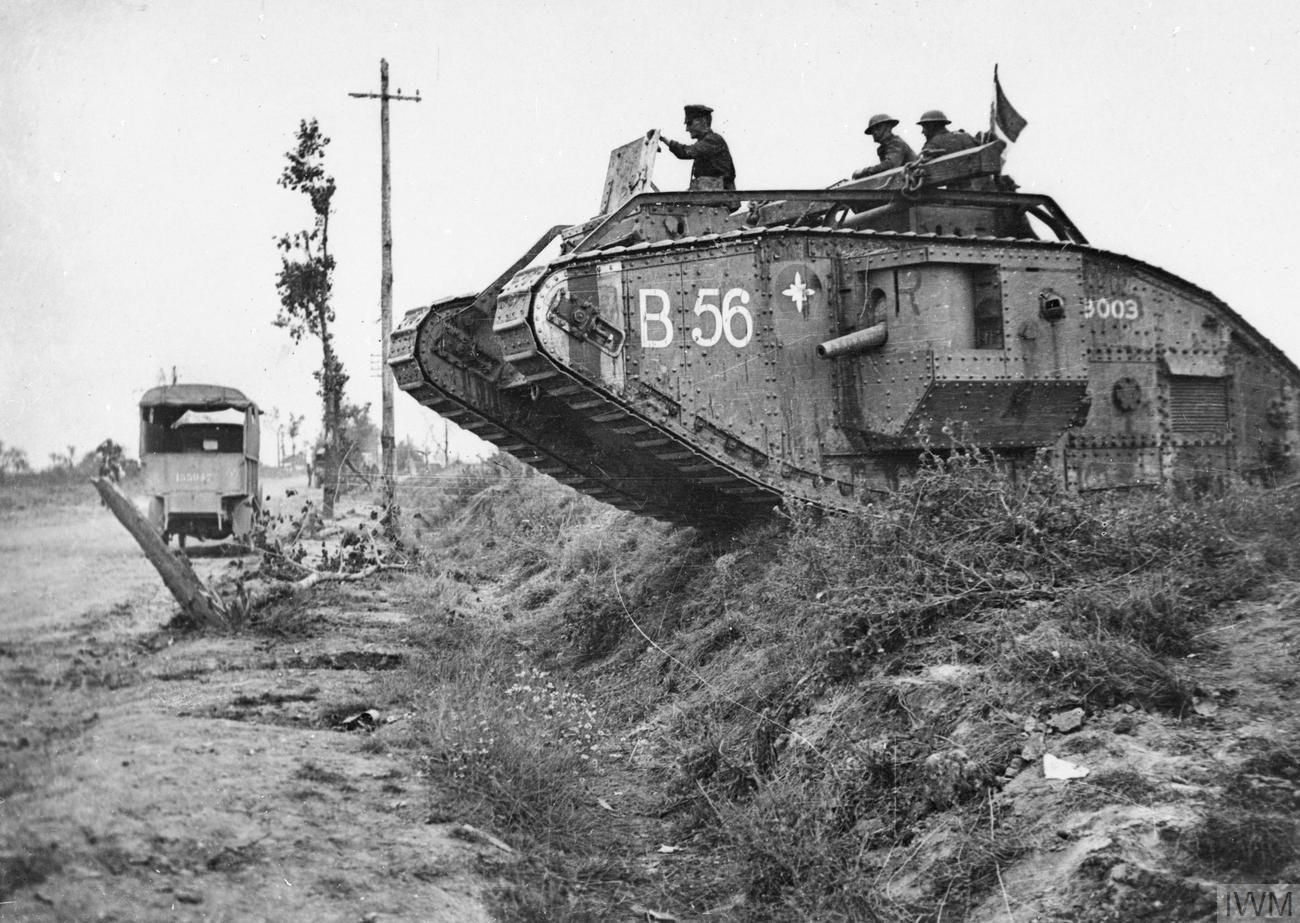
British tank on the first day of the Battle of Amiens.

- Battle of Amiens – The British Fourth Army, supported by Canadian, Australian, and French troops along with about 500 tanks, pushed eight miles past the German front line. The Canadians and Australians captured 12,000 German soldiers, while the British took 13,000 and the French captured another 3,000 prisoners. In all, the Allies captured close to 30,000 Germans on the first day of battle, leading German General Erich Ludendorff to refer to it as "the black day of the German Army". It was the beginning of a string of almost continuous victories for the Canadians and Australians, known as the 'Hundred Days Offensive'.
- German submarine SM UC-49 was depth charged and sunk in the English Channel by a Royal Navy vessel with the loss of all 31 crew.
- The sports club Instituto Atlético Central Córdoba was established in Córdoba, Argentina. It is best known for its football and basketball teams.
- Born: Jim Moran, American entrepreneur, founder of the JM Family Enterprises, one of the leading car dealerships in the United States; in Chicago (d. 2007)

== August 9, 1918 (Friday) ==
- Battle of Amiens – Allied forces widened their advance into territory lost to the Germans during the Spring Offensive with the bulk of the fighting between French and German forces at Montdidier, France.
- The British government officially recognized the Czechoslovak National Council "as the trustee of the future Czecho-Slovak Government".
- Eight Italian Ansaldo biplanes of the 87 Squadriglia "Serenimissa", led by Gabriele D'Annunzio, flew over Vienna for 30 minutes without interference from Austro-Hungarian forces, taking photographs and dropping leaflets before returning to base without a single loss.
- Indian chemist Prafulla Chandra Ray founded the Prafulla Chandra College in Bagerhat, British India (now the Government P.C. College of Bagerhat in Bangladesh).
- Born:
  - Robert Aldrich, American film director, known for suspense and action films including Vera Cruz, Kiss Me Deadly, What Ever Happened to Baby Jane? and The Dirty Dozen; in Cranston, Rhode Island (d. 1983)
  - Giles Cooper, Irish playwright, known for plays include Unman, Wittering and Zigo and Everything in the Garden; in Dublin (d. 1966, train accident)
  - Frank Rennie, New Zealand army officer, founder of the New Zealand Special Air Service, recipient of the Order of the British Empire and Military Cross; in Christchurch, New Zealand (d. 1992)
  - Albert Seedman, American law enforcer, first and so far only police officer of Jewish background to be Chief of Detectives of the New York City Police Department, recipient of the Legion of Honour; in New York City (d. 2013)
- Died: Marianne Cope, 80, German-American clergy, member of the Sisters of St Francis and administrator of St. Joseph's Hospital in Syracuse, New York (b. 1838)

== August 10, 1918 (Saturday) ==
- Battle of Amiens – German forces began to withdraw from positions captured during the Spring Offensive and retreat back towards the Hindenburg Line.
- The American Expeditionary Forces established the First United States Army under the command of General John J. Pershing after sufficient men and equipment had arrived in France, becoming the oldest active American field army.
- French troopship Polynesien was torpedoed and sunk in the Mediterranean Sea by German submarine SM UC-22 with the loss of 19 lives.
- German flying ace Erich Loewenhardt died when his aircraft collided with another plane from Jagdstaffel 11. Both pilots had bailed out but Löwenhardt's parachute failed to open, causing him to plummet to his death. Hours earlier, he had achieved his 54th victory putting him third behind fellow pilots Manfred von Richthofen and Ernst Udet as Germany's greatest World War I aces.
- German flying ace Rudolf Berthold collided with an enemy plane during a dogfight, forcing his Fokker plane to crash into a house. Berhold survived the crash with injuries, but was grounded from further missions. His total of 44 kills made him the sixth-highest-scoring German ace of World War I.
- Axeman of New Orleans – Joseph Romano, an elderly resident in New Orleans, was attacked in his home and struck in the head with an axe. His nieces that lived with him surprised the attacker, who they described as a dark-skinned male dressed in a dark suit and slouched. Though Romano was able to walk to the ambulance, he died two days later from complications to his head injury. The murder and resulting news coverage created a public panic in New Orleans, however, a new set of murders would not occur until March 1919.
- Following its second bankruptcy, the Colorado Midland Railway ceased operations in what was the largest single American railroad abandonment to this date.
- The football club Hamarkameratene was established in Hamar, Norway, originally under the name Freidig.
- The inaugural meeting of the British Chess Problem Society, the oldest society of its kind in the world, was held in London with English mathematician Henry Dudeney as chair.
- Born: Eugene Parks Wilkinson, American naval officer, first commander of the USS Nautilus, the world's first nuclear submarine, first commander of the USS Long Beach, the world's first nuclear surface warship, and first president and CEO of the Institute of Nuclear Power Operations, recipient of the Navy Distinguished Service Medal, Silver Star, and Legion of Merit; in Long Beach, California (d. 2013)
- Died:
  - Jean Brillant, 28, Canadian soldier, recipient of the Victoria Cross; killed in action (b. 1890)
  - Anastasie Brown, 91, American clergy, Superior General of the Sisters of Providence of Saint Mary-of-the-Woods from 1868 to 1874, and director of the Saint Mary-of-the-Woods College (b. 1826)
  - Irby Curry, 24, American football player, quarterback for the Vanderbilt Commodores football team from 1915 to 1916; killed in action (b. 1894)
  - William Pitt Kellogg, 87, American politician, U.S. Senator from Louisiana from 1868 to 1872 and from 1877 to 1883 (b. 1830)

== August 11, 1918 (Sunday) ==
- Vladimir Lenin issued an order by telegraph to hang at least 100 kulaks in an effort to suppress a kulak revolt in the Penza Gubernia region of Russia, although whether the order was carried out was unknown.
- British pilot Stuart Culley shot down German Zeppelin L 53 over the North Sea, the last airship to be destroyed in World War I. Culley had taken off in a Sopwith Camel from a barge towed behind the destroyer HMS Redoubt prior to engaging the airship, making it the first successful interception of an enemy aircraft by a shipborne fighter.
- The Saint John Shipbuilding company was established in Saint John, New Brunswick.
- The Austro-Hungarian cargo steamship Euterpe, sailing from Rijeka to the Bay of Kotor and transporting more than a thousand Austro-Hungarian soldiers, was torpedoed and sunk around 19:45 local time southwest of Dubac on Pag by the Italian F 7 submarine; hundreds of people were killed.

== August 12, 1918 (Monday) ==
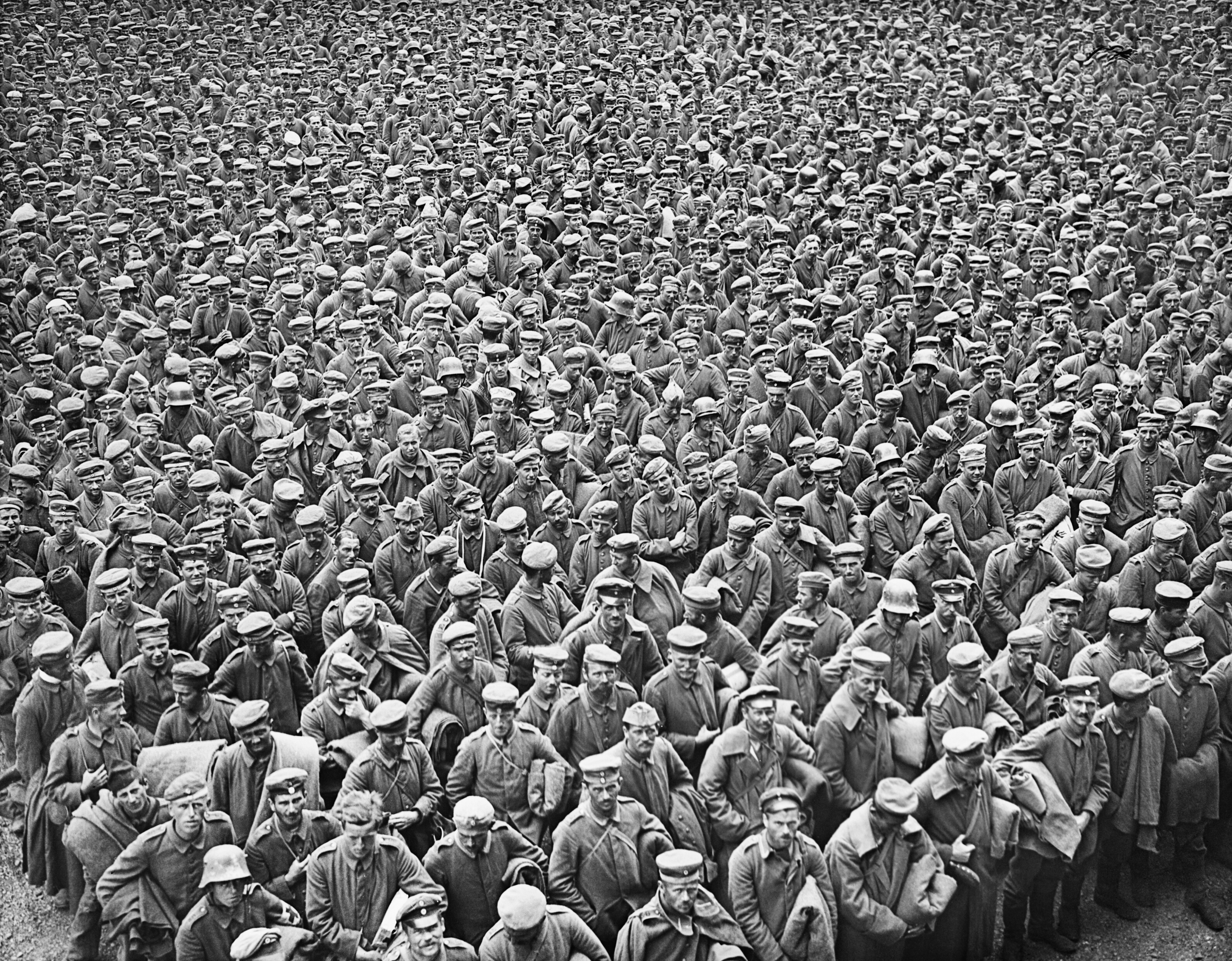
A crowd of German prisoners taken by the British Fourth Army during the Battle of Amiens.

- Battle of Amiens – British forces gained another 19 km (12 mi) into German positions held since the Spring Offensive, ending most of the major fighting.
- King George knighted John Monash, commander of the Australian Corps, on the battlefield near Château de Bertangles, France with the Order of the Bath, the first British commander to be knighted in that way for 200 years.
- Malleson mission – General Wilfrid Malleson lead a force of 500 soldiers with the 19th Punjabi Regiment into Turkestan to join up with 1,000 local Transcaspian militia to counter Bolsheviks active in the region.
- Born:
  - Sid Bernstein, American music producer, best known for promoting British rock bands in the United States leading to the British Invasion of the mid-1960s; in New York City (d. 2013)
  - Guy Gibson, British air force officer, commander of No. 617 Squadron which took part in Operation Chastise (the Dam "Busters raid" over Germany,) recipient of the Victoria Cross, Distinguished Flying Cross, Distinguished Service Order, and Legion of Merit; in Simla, British India (d. 1944, killed in a plane crash)
  - Roy C. Bennett, American songwriter, known for his collaborations with songwriter Sid Tepper, including several hits for Elvis Presley; in New York City (d. 2015)
- Died: Anna Held, 46, Polish-French actress, best known for her collaborations with husband Florenz Ziegfeld Jr. in the popular Ziegfeld Follies productions (b. 1873)

== August 13, 1918 (Tuesday) ==
- Battle of San Matteo – Italian alpine troops launched a surprise attack on the San Matteo peak of Ortler mountain in the Alps that was held by Austro-Hungarian troops. Half of the Austro-Hungarian unit was captured while the rest retreated off the summit. At an altitude of 2,800 metres, it was the highest battle ever fought until a battle during the Kargil War in 1999 was fought at 5,600 metres.
- Italian Navy cruiser Etruria was destroyed at port in Livorno, Italy when a barge carrying ammunition exploded beside the vessel.
- German submarine SM UB-30 was depth-charged and sunk in the North Sea with the loss of all 26 crew.
- American pilot Field Eugene Kindley shot down a Fokker fighter plane piloted by Lothar von Richthofen, the brother the late great German war ace Manfred von Richthofen, scoring his fourth victory. Richthofen was an ace in his own right with 40 confirmed air-to-air victories, but suffered serious wounds during the crash and never flew in combat again.
- Born:
  - Frederick Sanger, British biochemist, twice recipient of the Nobel Prize in Chemistry for his research into insulin and DNA sequencing; in Rendcomb, England (d. 2013)
  - Noor Hassanali, Trinidadian state leader, second President of Trinidad and Tobago; in San Fernando, Trinidad and Tobago (d. 2006)
- Died: Charles Dawson Booker, 21, British air force officer, commander of the No. 201 Squadron during World War I; killed in action (b. 1897)

== August 14, 1918 (Wednesday) ==
- French flying ace René Fonck shot down three German aircraft in ten seconds in a head-on attack, with all three crashing within 100 meters (328 feet) of one another near Roye, Somme, France.
- Born: Mohinder Singh Pujji, Indian air force officer, first Sikh pilot to volunteer for the Royal Air Force during World War II, recipient of the Distinguished Flying Cross and War Medal; in Simla, British India (d. 2010)

== August 15, 1918 (Thursday) ==
- An earthquake measuring with a magnitude of 8.3 triggered a tsunami in the Celebes Sea and caused widespread damage along the coastline of Mindanao, Philippines, including 52 deaths.
- Hundred Days Offensive – Field Marshal Douglas Haig refused an order from Supreme Allied Commander Ferdinand Foch to continue the Amiens offensive as troop advances and supply routes were faltering in the face of regrouping German positions. Instead, he reorganized the British Third Army and U.S. Army Second Corps for an offensive on the German-held town of Albert, France.
- The Royal Air Force established air squadron No. 242.
- Born: Derrick Bailey, British cricketer, batsman for the Gloucestershire County Cricket Club from 1949 to 1952; in London (d. 2009)

== August 16, 1918 (Friday) ==
- An Allied force under command of Lionel Dunsterville arrived in Baku, Azerbaijan.
- Battle of Lake Baikal – A Czechoslovak Legion force under command of Radola Gajda used two captured armed steamships to raid a Red Army port on Lake Baikal in Siberia. The Russian icebreaker SS Baikal was sunk in the attack, and the port's harbor and train station were shelled and destroyed. The victory was the only time Czech forces ever engaged in a naval battle.
- Freight sheds owned by Grand Trunk Railway in Ottawa were destroyed by fire, with losses of property and goods estimated at $85,000.

== August 17, 1918 (Saturday) ==
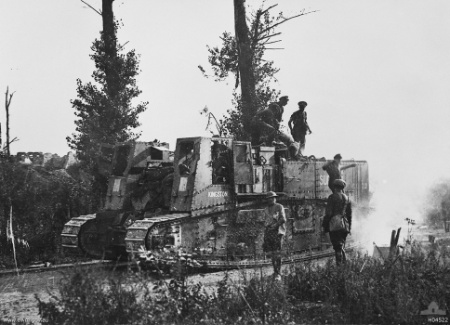
British troops resupply a tank during the Second Battle of the Somme.

- Second Battle of the Somme – The French Tenth Army attacked the German-held town of Noyon, France in an early offensive prior to the main Allied attack at Albert four days later.
- North Russia intervention – Allied forces supporting the Northern Regional Government advanced from Arkhangelsk to Onega Bay, Russia.
- An Allied offensive to control the entire Absheron Peninsula of Azerbaijan ended in failure.
- The Martin MB aircraft was first flown.
- British war poet Wilfred Owen met his friend Siegfried Sassoon for the last time in London and spent what Sassoon later described as "the whole of a hot cloudless afternoon together."
- Born: George Scratchley Brown, American air force officer, Chairman of the Joint Chiefs of Staff from 1974 to 1978; in Montclair, New Jersey (d. 1978)

== August 18, 1918 (Sunday) ==
- The Royal Air Force established air squadrons No. 246, No. 249, and No. 257.
- The Brazilian Medical Mission, led by Dr. Nabuco Gouveia, was established with 86 doctors to provide war-time medical care for the Western Front.
- The Thule Society was established in Munich, a secret occult group that developed elaborate theories on the origins of the Aryan race.
- Born:
  - Cisco Houston, American folk singer, known with his collaborations with Woody Guthrie; in Wilmington, Delaware (d. 1961)
  - Alexander Shelepin, Soviet politician, second Chairman of the KGB; in Voronezh, Russia (d. 1994)

== August 19, 1918 (Monday) ==
- A U.S. Navy Curtiss airplane broke a new world speed record of 163 mph (262 km/h).
- A Handley aircraft carrying six crew and one passenger crashed near Maxstoke, England during a test flight, killing all on board.
- The Austro-Hungarian steamship Goritia, sailing from Durrës, struck a mine near Đerane Reef (Krš od Đerana) southeast of Ulcinj and sank.
- Born:
  - Shankar Dayal Sharma, Indian state leader, 9th President of India; in Bhopal, India (d. 1999)
  - Ed Frutig, American football player, main receiver for the Michigan Wolverines football team in 1941, receiver for the Green Bay Packers and Detroit Lions from 1941 to 1946; in River Rouge, Michigan (d. 2011)
- Died: Orville Gibson, 62, American designer, founder of the Gibson Guitar Company (b. 1856)

== August 20, 1918 (Tuesday) ==
- The Royal Air Force established air squadrons No. 229, No. 230, No. 231, No. 232, No. 234, No. 235, No. 236, No. 237, No. 238, No. 239, No. 240, No. 245, No. 247, No. 248, No. 259, No. 261, and No. 265.
- Born:
  - Crystal Bennett, British archaeologist, founder of the British Institute in Amman, Jordan; in Alderney, Channel Islands (d. 1987)
  - Hasan Abdullayev, Azerbaijani physicist, director of the Azerbaijan National Academy of Sciences from 1957 to 1993, recipient of the Order of Lenin; in Yaycı, Azerbaijan (d. 1993)
  - Jacqueline Susann, American writer, author of Valley of the Dolls, The Love Machine, and Once Is Not Enough; in Philadelphia (d. 1974)

== August 21, 1918 (Wednesday) ==
- Second Battle of the Somme – The second phase of the Allied offensive against Germany began with attacks on Albert and Bapaume, France.
- The Nieuport-Delage aircraft was first flown.
- The U.S. Navy motor patrol boat USS Montauk (SP-392) sank off Florida, drowning seven of her crew.
- The comic strip Cap Stubbs and Tippie by Edwina Dumm debuted in the Ohio newspaper The Columbus Monitor, remaining in syndication until 1966.
- A powerful tornado struck Tyler, Minnesota, killing 36 people and injuring over 100 others. It would be the fourth deadliest tornado in the state's history.
- Born: Bruria Kaufman, American-Israeli physicist, major contributor to general relativity and statistical physics; in New York City (d. 2010)

== August 22, 1918 (Thursday) ==
- Second Battle of the Somme – British and Allied forces captured the French village of Albert from the Germans, while combined British and American divisions advanced on German-held Arras, France.
- Fighter pilot Frigyes Hefty of the Austro-Hungarian Aviation Troops successfully parachuted from his burning plane after a dogfight with Italian aircraft, becoming the first person to survive a combat parachute jump.
- Born: Said Mohamed Djohar, Comorron state leader, 11th and 16th President of the Comoros; in Mahajanga, Madagascar (d. 2006)
- Died: Alfred Cheetham, 52, British explorer and naval officer, member of the south polar Nimrod Expedition and Imperial Trans-Antarctic Expedition; killed in action on the North Sea (b. 1867)

== August 23, 1918 (Friday) ==
- Second Battle of Bapaume – The New Zealand Division, with British support, secured the rail line between Albert and Arras, France and recaptured the French commune Bihucourt from the Germans. They also launched attacks on the German-held French communes of Achiet-le-Petit, Irles, and Grévillers.
- The Bessarabian Peasants' Party was established in Chișinău, Moldova as a replacement for the National Moldavian Party.
- The Vernadsky National Library of Ukraine was established with Ukrainian scholar Vladimir Vernadsky as its head.
- Born: Bernard Fisher, American medical scientist, leading researcher into treatment of breast cancer; in Pittsburgh (d. 2019)

== August 24, 1918 (Saturday) ==
- Second Battle of Bapaume – The New Zealand Division captured the French village of Grévillers held by the Germans.
- Born:
  - Sikander Bakht, Indian politician, cabinet minister for the Atal Bihari Vajpayee administration, recipient of the Padma Vibhushan; in Delhi (d. 2004)
  - David Stevenson, Australian naval officer, Chief of Naval Staff for the Royal Australian Navy from 1973 to 1976; in Fortitude Valley, Queensland, Australia (d. 1998)
- Died:
  - Samuel Forsyth, 26, New Zealand soldier, recipient of the Victoria Cross for action during the Gallipoli campaign and Second Battle of Bapaume; killed in action (b. 1891)
  - William Howard Brett, 72, American librarian, head of the Cleveland Public Library from 1884 to 1918 (b. 1846)
  - Lloyd Andrews Hamilton, 24, American air force officer, member of the 17th Aero Squadron, recipient of the Distinguished Service Cross and Distinguished Flying Cross; killed in action over Armentières (b. 1894)

== August 25, 1918 (Sunday) ==
- Second Battle of Bapaume – New Zealand forces began battling the Germans block by block through the French town of Bapaume, but failed to dislodge them.
- Australian flying ace Jerry Pentland of the No. 87 Squadron shot two German aircraft – a DFW two-seater and a Fokker fighter using a Sopwith Dolphin before being shot down himself and wounded in the foot. They were his last victories, but he emerged from World War I as Australia′s fifth-highest-scoring ace with 23 kills.
- Born:
  - Leonard Bernstein, American composer and conductor, music director for the New York Philharmonic, composer for popular musicals West Side Story, Peter Pan, the operetta Candide and theatrical production Mass; in Lawrence, Massachusetts (d. 1990)
  - Sara Christian, American race driver, first woman to compete in NASCAR; in Dahlonega, Georgia (d. 1980)
  - Richard Greene, English actor, best known for the lead title role in the 1950s television series The Adventures of Robin Hood; in Plymouth (d. 1985)

== August 26, 1918 (Monday) ==
- Battle of the Scarpe – The Canadian Corps broke through the German line and advanced five kilometers, capturing the French towns of Monchy-le-Preux and Wancourt. During the battle, Lieutenant Charles Smith Rutherford of the 3rd Canadian Division subdued two pillboxes by himself and captured over 80 German prisoners, earning him the Victoria Cross.
- Battle of Baku – The Islamic Army of the Caucasus launched a major attack on the Allied-occupied city of Baku, Azerbaijan, in what was the final offensive of the Ottoman Empire in World War I.
- Second Battle of Bapaume – New Zealand forces encircled Bapaume, France in a second attempt to force the Germans out of the town.
- The American Expeditionary Forces established the First Army Air Service to support American ground troops on the Western Front.
- The United States Army established the 41st Field Artillery Brigade at Fort Monroe, Virginia.
- The comedic play Lightnin' by Winchell Smith and Frank Bacon debuted at the Gaiety Theatre in New York City, with Bacon in the lead role. It played continuously over three seasons with a record breaking run of 1,291 performances.
- The village of Alliance, Alberta was established.
- Born:
  - Katherine Johnson, American physicist, member of Project Mercury for NASA, recipient of the Presidential Medal of Freedom; in White Sulphur Springs, West Virginia (d. 2020)
  - Hutton Gibson, American religious writer, promoter of Sedevacantism, a model of traditional Catholic beliefs, father of actor Mel Gibson; in Peekskill, New York (d. 2020)

== August 27, 1918 (Tuesday) ==
- Battle of Amiens – The Allies reported capturing 50,000 German troops and 500 guns since the start offensive nearly a month earlier. English war correspondent Philip Gibbs called the battle a turning point in the war on the Western Front, writing that "the change has been greater in the minds of men than in the taking of territory. On our side the army seems to be buoyed up with the enormous hope of getting on with this business quickly" and that, "there is a change also in the enemy's mind. They no longer have even a dim hope of victory on this western front. All they hope for now is to defend themselves long enough to gain peace by negotiation."
- Second Battle of Bapaume – After shelling failed to force the Germans out of Bapaume, France, New Zealand forces launched a general assault on the town.
- Battle of Ambos Nogales – U.S. troops with the 35th Infantry Regiment skirmished against Mexican Carrancistas and their German advisers at the border town of Nogales, Arizona. Twenty-eight American soldiers and several civilians were wounded and four soldiers and two civilians were killed in the fight. As well, between 28 and 30 Mexican soldiers, two German advisers, and around 100 Mexican civilians were killed, including Mayor Felix B. Peñaloza who attempted to quell the violence but was supposedly hit by a bullet from the Arizona side. Another 300 Mexican civilians were reported wounded. As German military officers were involved, it was considered the only battle of World War I fought on American soil.
- The first Director of the United States Army Air Service was appointed.
- Born:
  - Ann Baumgartner, American aviator, first woman to pilot a United States Army Air Forces jet aircraft; in Augusta, Georgia (d. 2008)
  - Jelle Zijlstra, Dutch state leader, 34th Prime Minister of the Netherlands; in Oosterbierum, Netherlands (d. 2001)
  - Chang Chun-ha, Korean journalist and activist, critic of the Yun Posun and Park Chung-hee administrations; in Uijeongbu, Korea (d. 1975)

== August 28, 1918 (Wednesday) ==
- Battle of the Scarpe – Canadian forces captured a portion of the Fresnes-Rouvroy defence line in France at a cost of 254 officers and 5,547 troops. William Clark-Kennedy earned the Victoria Cross for leading an advance while seriously wounded. More than 3,300 German soldiers were taken prisoner, along with 53 guns and 519 machine guns.
- Battle of Baku – Ottoman troops attempted to overrun a key Allied position but were driven back, although the undermanned force had to retreat further into Baku, Azerbaijan.
- North Russia intervention – A British attempt to invade Russian-held territory in East Karelia (located between Russia and Finland) failed with the loss of three dead and 18 wounded.
- The General Aeroplane Company, the first commercial airplane manufacturer in Detroit, officially ceased operations.
- Born: Alejandro Agustín Lanusse, Argentine state leader, 37th President of Argentina; in Buenos Aires (d. 1996)

== August 29, 1918 (Thursday) ==
- Second Battle of the Somme – The French Tenth Army captured Noyon, France from the Germans.
- Second Battle of Bapaume – New Zealand forces launched a general attack on Bapaume, France and finally drove the Germans out of the town.
- Battle of the Scarpe – The Canadian Automobile Machine Gun Brigade pushed the German line back another kilometer, allowing them to set up posts right on the banks of the River Scarpe.
- Battle of Baku – Ottoman troops captured key defensive positions around Baku, Azerbaijan but heavy losses slowed plans to take the city itself, allowing the defending Allies time to regroup.
- The Communist Party of Finland was established after the Reds were defeated in the Finnish Civil War, but the party remained illegal in the country until 1944.
- British union leader Jim Bradley organized a secret ballot for firefighters that led to voting to cede from the National Union of Public Employees and form a new union eventually named the Fire Brigades Union.
- Born:
  - Anthony Crosland, British politician, cabinet minister for the Harold Wilson and James Callaghan administrations; in St Leonards-on-Sea, England (d. 1977)
  - John Herivel, British historian and code-breaker, member of the code-breaking team at Bletchley Park during World War II, author of Herivelismus and the German Military Enigma; in Belfast (d. 2011)
  - Brian Stonehouse, English artist and spy, member of the Special Operations Executive during World War II, and noted portrait painter of the Royal family; in Torquay, England (d. 1998)

== August 30, 1918 (Friday) ==
- Battle of the Scarpe – Canadian forces cleared the Fresnes-Rouvroy trench system and captured another 50 German prisoners.
- Second Battle of Bapaume – New Zealand forces secured Bancourt Ridge outside of Bapaume, France to ensure it could not fall back onto enemy hands.
- Around 20,000 London police officers went on strike for increased pay and union recognition.
- Vladimir Lenin was shot and wounded by Fanny Kaplan in Moscow. On the same day, Moisei Uritsky, the head of the Cheka in Petrograd, was assassinated by Leonid Kannegisser, an Imperial Russian Army cadet, in retaliation for executions carried out by the Cheka on fellow officers. The Cheka launched a crackdown on dissidents in what became known as the Red Terror.
- The Arab Bureau ceased publication of the Arab Bulletin.
- Born:
  - Ted Williams, American baseball player and manager, left fielder for the Boston Red Sox from 1939 to 1960, and manager for the Texas Rangers from 1969 to 1972; in San Diego (d. 2002)
  - Sergey Afanasyev, Russian politician, first Minister of General Machine Building for the Soviet Union; in Klin, Russia (d. 2001)
- Died:
  - William Duncan, 86, British missionary, founder of the Tsimshian communities of Metlakatla, British Columbia and Metlakatla, Alaska (b. 1832)
  - J. Donald Cameron, 85, American politician, 32nd United States Secretary of War, U.S. Senator of Pennsylvania from 1877 to 1897 (b. 1833)

== August 31, 1918 (Saturday) ==
- Battle of Mont Saint-Quentin – The Australian Corps under command of John Monash crossed the Somme River and captured the German-held hill of Mont Saint-Quentin in France.
- Second Battle of Bapaume – New Zealand forces captured the French commune of Riencourt.
- As the Red Terror ramped up, Cheka agents stormed the British embassy in Petrograd, suspecting counterrevolutionary organizations were using resources within it. In the ensuing raid, British naval officer Francis Cromie was shot and killed by Cheka agents and another 40 were arrested on suspicion of collaborating with counterrevolutionaries. The British government shut down the embassy days later and ordered the diplomatic staff to Finland.
- U.S. President Woodrow Wilson signed into a law a bill to revoke the charter of the National German-American Alliance, officially ending the organization even though it had been inactive since April.
- Born:
  - Alan Jay Lerner, American songwriter, known for his lyrical collaborations with Frederick Loewe and Burton Lane for My Fair Lady, Camelot and On a Clear Day You Can See Forever; in New York City (d. 1986)
  - Kenny Washington, American football player, first African-American to be signed onto an NFL team, running back for the Los Angeles Rams from 1946 to 1948; in Los Angeles (d. 1971)
- Died: Ghenadie Petrescu, 82, Romanian clergy, Patriarch of All Romania for the Romanian Orthodox Church from 1893 to 1896 (b. 1836)
