= Yaydzhi =

Yaydzhi or Yaudzhi or Yayji or Yəyci or Yaycı may refer to:

- Zovaber, Gegharkunik, Armenia
- Zovaber, Syunik, Armenia
- Harzhis, Syunik, Armenia
- Yaycı, Azerbaijan
- Aşağı Yayci, Azerbaijan
- Yuxarı Yayci, Azerbaijan
- Yaycı, Iğdır, Turkey
