= Weichold =

Weichold is a surname. Notable people with the surname include:

- Eberhard Weichold (1891–1960), German naval officer
- Mark Weichold, American engineer
