= Zovaber =

Zovaber may refer to:

- Zovaber, Gegharkunik, Armenia
- Zovaber, Syunik, Armenia
