= Hasan Abdullayev =

Azerbaijani nuclear physicist (1918–1993)

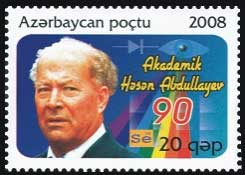
- A stamp dedicated to the 90th anniversary of Abdullayev's birthday, issued in 2008
- Born: August 20, 1918; Yayji, Nakhchivan, Azerbaijan Democratic Republic
- Died: September 1, 1993 (aged 75); Baku, Azerbaijan
- Citizenship: Azerbaijan
- Education: Azerbaijan State Pedagogical University
- Awards: Order of Lenin, Order of the Red Banner of Labour, Vavilov Gold Medal, Azerbaijan State Prize
- Scientific career
- Fields: Physics
- Workplaces: National Academy of Sciences of the Azerbaijan SSR

Hasan Abdullayev (also spelled as Hasan Mammadbaghir oghlu Abdullayev; Azerbaijani: Həsən Məmmədbağır oğlu Abdullayev; Russian: Гасан Мамедбагир оглы Абдуллаев; August 20, 1918 – September 1, 1993) was a leading Soviet and Azerbaijani physicist, scientist and public official, who served as President of the National Academy of Sciences of the Azerbaijan SSR. He was a Doctor of Sciences in physics and mathematics, Professor of physics and mathematics, Director of the Institute of Mathematics and Physics of the National Academy of Sciences of the Azerbaijan SSR, full Academician of the National Academy of Sciences of the Azerbaijan SSR, corresponding member of the Soviet Academy of Sciences and Russian Academy of Sciences, and in 1970-1983 was the longest-serving President of the National Academy of Sciences of the Azerbaijan SSR. He was also an elected member of the Azerbaijan SSR Parliament, and the elected member of the 8th, 9th and 10th convocations of the Supreme Soviet of the Soviet Union. Academician Abdullayev was one of the founders of Soviet semiconductors physics and a leading scientist in new technologies. He made an outstanding contribution to the development of electronics, astrophysics, aeronautics, medicine, biophysics and defense industries. Academician Abdullayev was the author of 585 Soviet and foreign patents, including 171 secret and 65 top secret patents, and the author of 28 scientific books (monographs), and over 800 journal and encyclopedia articles in English, Russian and Azerbaijani languages.

== Biography ==
Hasan Abdullayev was born on August 20, 1918, in Yayji, Nakhchivan during the time of the Azerbaijan Democratic Republic. He died on September 1, 1993, in Baku, and was buried at the Alley of Honor.

Hasan Abdullayev's name was memorialized by naming the Institute of Physics of the Azerbaijan Academy of Sciences, which he led and expanded into a world-class scientific research institute in 1957–1993, after him, as well as naming a street in downtown Baku, installing a plaque on the apartment complex he lived in, and naming a primary school in Nakhchivan. Additionally, several scholarships named after him have been awarded to undergraduate, graduate and post-graduate science students in Azerbaijan since 2003. Every five years conferences dedicated to his scientific heritage have been held in Baku, such as in 2013, 2007, and 2003.

- 1948 – 1950 – Deputy Director of the Research Institute of Physics and Mathematics of the Azerbaijan SSR Academy of Sciences
- 1950 – Acting Director of the Research Institute of Physics and Mathematics of the Azerbaijan SSR Academy of Sciences
- 1955 – Corresponding Member of the Azerbaijan SSR Academy of Sciences
- 1957 – Director of the Research Institute of Physics and Mathematics of the Azerbaijan SSR Academy of Sciences
- 1957 – 1993 – Founder and Permanent Director of the Institute of Physics of the Azerbaijan SSR Academy of Sciences, a leading physics research institute in the USSR, winner of 12 Soviet awards
- 1967 – Full Academician of the Azerbaijan SSR Academy of Sciences
- 1968 – 1993 – Member of Joint Physics Astronomy Department of the USSR Academy of Sciences, member of the Scientific Council "Physics and Chemistry of Semiconductors" of Presidium of USSR Academy of Sciences, Member of Supreme Attestation Commission of USSR
- 1968 – 1970 – Academic-Secretary of the Physics and Mathematics Department of Azerbaijan SSR Academy of Sciences
- 1970 – Corresponding Member of the USSR and Russian Academy of Sciences
- 1970 – 1983 – President of Azerbaijan SSR Academy of Sciences
- 1970 – 1984 – Member of the USSR and Azerbaijan SSR Supreme Parliaments

Spoke native Azerbaijani, was fluent in Russian and German, as well as English. Married, with three children, and six grandchildren.

== Work ==
Academician Abdullayev dedicated over fifty years of his life to the physics of semiconductors. Discovered new groups of binary and ternary compounds of selenium and tellurium, suggested diodes with controlled electronic memory, created complex semiconductors used as receivers for visible and infrared spectrum areas. By researching the physics of selenium and selenium appliances, was the first to explain the abnormalities in selenium and invented an approach to control them. Carried out a set of research projects to receive semiconductor monocrystals of complex chemical composition for lasers and memory modules. Elaborated new semiconductor materials for heat converters.

In 1954, Hasan Abdullayev founded the Department of Semiconductor Physics at the Baku State University (BSU). Abdullayev founded the Nakhchivan and Ganja branches of the Azerbaijan SSR Academy of Sciences and established more than 50 scientific production and construction bureaus, which were tasked with the application of scientific theories and discoveries, and their more rapid introduction into production and life, in the republic.

According to a 2010 article published in the Russian scientific journal Physics and technique of semiconductors of the Joffe Institute, dedicated to the 60th anniversary of semiconductor electronics research in the USSR, one of the important roles in Soviet semiconductor electronics research, development and innovation was done by academician Abdullayev.

Academician Abdullayev's lifelong research and work concentrated on chemical elements selenium and tellurium, their applications in semiconductors, biophysics and nuclear sciences.

Zhores Alferov, the Nobel-prize winning physicist, praised the work and legacy of his late colleague and friend, academician Abdullayev, recognizing how hard it was for Azerbaijani scientists to rise even within USSR, much less in the world, and only a few people as Abdullayev managed to do it, creating new industries and directions in physics and other sciences.

At the initiative and under the direct leadership of academician Hasan Abdullayev the following research and scientific institutions and initiatives were established:

- 1947 – Citywide (later Republican) seminars on physics in Baku
- 1954 – Department of Semiconductor Physics established at the Baku State University
- 1957-1959 – Institute of Physics and Institute of Mathematics and Mechanics
- 1959 – Shemakha Astrophysical Observatory, based on the astrophysics Sector
- 1965 – Institute of Cybernetics established
- 1967 – Batabat Astrophysical Sector (now Observatory) in Nakhchivan region
- 1969 – Radiation Research Sector, later the Institute of Radiation Problems, on the basis of which the National Centre for Nuclear Research has been created in 2014
- 1970 – Scientific-production associations «Ulduz», «Nord», «Azon», «Iskra», «Tellur», «Billur» (1968)
- 1972 – Nakhchivan Research Center, which is now the Nakhchivan Department of ANAS (National Academy of the Republic of Azerbaijan)
- 1972 – Sector of Microbiology (now Institute); Experimental-production works at the Institute of Petrochemical Processes
- 1973 – The branch of the Institute of Applied Physics, which is now the Institute of Photo-electronics;
- 1973—Sheki Zonal Scientific Base, which became the Sheki Regional Research Center
- 1974 – Department of Astrophysics at the Baku State University;
- 1974 -- "Caspian" Research Center at the Academy of Sciences of the Azerbaijan SSR, since 1992 – Azerbaijan Space Agency
- 1975 – two Laboratories of High-Energy Physics at the Institute of Physics. Collaborative research with the Institute of Nuclear Research (Dubna) and the Institute of High-Energy Physics (Serpukhov)
- 1976 – The Sector of Physics of the Earth at the Institute of Geology;
- 1976—Research and Development Institute of viticulture and winemaking in Mehtiabad region of Azerbaijan
- 1978 – Institute of Space Research of Earth Natural Resources (first of a kind in the world)
- 1978—Institute of Organochlorine Synthesis in Sumgayit.
- 1978 – Special Construction Bureau (SCB) "Cybernetics". SCB with pilot plant "Crystal"; Darndag SCB Technology Bureau with Pilot Plant
- 1979—Seysmic Station in Guba. (under aegis of "Geophysics" scientific center of ANA)
- 1979 – Agsu Research and Development base in Khanlar region
- 1980-1981 – Regional Scientific Center in Ganja (then called Kirovabad)
- 1981 – Pilot Plant "Selenium"; "Register" with pilot production; Special Construction-Technological Bureau (SKTB) "Reagent". (1982); Special Construction Bureau (SKB) "Crystal" in Baku (1985) and other scientific institutions and technology productions

== Awards ==
Academician Hasan Abdullayev was honored with the top Soviet award — the Order of Lenin in 1978, the Order of the Red Banner of Labour, the Vavilov Gold Medal of the Federation of Cosmonautics Siolkovsky Gold Medal of the Federation of Cosmonautics, was laureate of Azerbaijan SSR State Award in 1972, was an Honored Scientist of Azerbaijan SSR, and with other medals and prestigious Soviet and international scientific awards.

== Scientific efforts and peer recognition ==
Academician Hasan Abdullayev is the author of 28 monographs, several scientific textbooks, approximately six hundred scientific journal articles. He holds 585 patents from USSR (including 171 secret and 65 top secret patents for technologies with military applications), and 35 foreign patents from France, Germany, Great Britain, Japan, Sweden, Italy, Bulgaria, India, and U.S. (United States Patent 3,472,652).

Academician Abdullayev received highest praise from his colleagues, including Nobel Prize winner academician Zhores Alferov, Nobel Prize winner academician Alexander Prokhorov, Kurchatov Institute President and Director Evgeny Velikhov, academician Bentsion Vul, academician Vladimir Tuchkevich, academician Sergey Kapitsa, academician Roald Sagdeev, Nobel Prize winner professor Rudolf Ludwig Mossbauer, academician Nikolay Bogolyubov, Soviet Academy of Sciences Presidents academician Alexander Nesmeyanov, academician Anatoly Petrovich Alexandrov, academician Mstislav Keldysh and other Soviet and foreign scientists.

According to a 2008 article, "Academician Abdullayev was called the Father of Physics in Azerbaijan and one of the Founders of the School of Semiconductor Research in the Soviet Union by such authoritative scientists as academicians Zh.Alferov, Yu.Gulyaev, L.Kurbatov, V.Isakov, Professor D.Nasledov, and others. In fact, the Great Soviet Encyclopedia, the most authoritative Soviet encyclopedia — the Soviet equivalent of the Encyclopædia Britannica in the West, listed the names of scientists, making the greatest contributions to the development of semiconductor electronics and microelectronics in this order: A.F.Ioffe (who was Abdullayev's mentor during his postdoctoral studies in Leningrad), N.P.Sazhin, Ya.I.Frenkel, B.M.Vul, V.M.Tuchkevich, H.B.Abdullayev, Zh.I.Alferov, L.V.Keldish, and others (Third Edition, 1970, page 351). Thus, already in 1970, this encyclopedia put academician Abdullayev as the sixth most influential scientist in semi-conductor research, higher than such giants as Academicians Alferov and Keldish!"

Academician Abdullayev was recognized as the top expert on the chemical element selenium, and thus entrusted authoring the article on selenium in the third (final) edition of the top scientific reference publication — the Great Soviet Encyclopedia.

== Publications ==
- Atomic Diffusion in Semiconductor Structures. H.Abdullaev, Hasan Mammadbaghir oghlu Abdullayev. Harwood Academic Publishers, Jan 1, 1987 — Science — 340 pages London-Paris-New York-Melbourne. Атомная диффузия в полупроводниковых структурах. Г.Б.Абдуллаев и др. Атомиздат. Москва., 1980
- Electronic semiconductors and their application. Abdullayev H.B., Acad.of Sc.Azerb.SSR., Baku, 1952. Электронные полупроводники и их применение. Elektron yarımkeçiricilər. Абдуллаев Г.Б., Изд. АН Аз.ССР, Bakı, 1952.
- The free electrons and the physical basis of their application. Abdullayev H.B. Academy of Sciences of the Azerbaijan SSR., Baku, 1954. Sərbəst elektron və onun tətbiqinin fiziki əsasları. Azərbaycan SSR Elmlər Akademiyası., nəşriyatı Bakı,1954.Свободные электроны и физические основы их применения. Академия наук Аз.ССР, Баку, 1954
- Semiconductor Rectifiers. Abdullayev H.B. Press of the Academy of Sciences of the Azerbaijan SSR, Baku (1958). (Полупроводниковые выпрямители), (Yarımkeçiricilər düzləndiricilər. Yarıiletken doğrultucular). Г.Б.Абдуллаев. изд. АН Аз.ССР, Bakı, Azərbaycan SSR Elmlər Akademiyası Nəşriyatı, 1958, 204 c.
- Physical Processes Occurring in Selenium and Selenium Devices. Abdullayev H.B. Press of the Academy of Sciences of the Azerbaijan SSR., Baku, (1959).Физические процессы, происходящие в селене и селеновых приборах. Абдуллаев Г.Б., Баку., изд. АН Аз.ССР, 1959.
- Questions of Metallurgy and Physics of Semiconductors. Вопросы металлургии и физики полупроводников. Aбдуллаев Г.Б., Москва, изд. АН СССР, 1959.
- Semiconductors. Abdullayev H.B. Bakı, Azərbaycan SSR Elmlər Akademiyası Nəşriyatı, 1961. -91s.
- Surface and contact phenomena in Semiconductors Abdullayev H.B. Tomsk University Press, Tomsk (1964).Поверхностные и контактные явления в полупроводниках. Абдуллаев Г.Б. 1964., изд. Томск. ун-та. (Россия)
- Radioisotopes and their Application in Semiconductor Physics. Abdullayev H.B. Press of the Academy of Sciences of the Azerbaijan SSR., Baku, (1964).Радиоизотопы и их применение в физике полупроводников. Абдуллаев Г.Б. и др. изд. АН АзССР, Баку, 1964.
- Investigation of the effect of Tellurium sublayer on the properties of selenium valves. Исследование влияния подслоя Те на свойства селеновых вентилей. Абдуллаев Г.Б. и др.изд. ФИАН, Баку, 1964.
- Selenium, Tellurium and Their Application. Abdullayev H.B. Press of the Academy of Sciences of the Azerbaijan SSR., Baku, (1965).Селен,Теллур и их применение. Абдуллаев Г.Б. и др. изд. АН Азерб. ССР.Баку., 1965
- Semiconductor components in instrumentation engineering. Полупроводниковые элементы в приборостроении (ТНТК). Абдуллаев Г.Б. и др. изд. Оптприбор, Москва 1966
- Compound Semiconductors. Abdullayev H.B., Press of the Academy of Sciences of the Azerbaijan SSR., Baku, (1966). (Slozhniye Poluprovodniki).
- Spectroscopy of solids. Abdullayev H.B., "Nauka"., Leningrad, 1969. Спектроскопия твердого тела. Абдуллаев Г.Б. и др.изд. «Наука», Ленинград, 1969
- Some Questions in the Physics of p--n Junctions. Abdullayev H.B. Elm, Baku,1971. Некоторые вопросы физики электронно-дырочных переходов., Абдуллаев Г.Б. и др., Изд, "Элм", Баку, 1971
- Radiation Physics of Non-metallic crystals. Abdullayev G.B. "Naukova Dumka", Kiev,1971. Радиационная физика неметаллических кристаллов. Aбдуллаев Г.Б. и др.«Наукова думка»., Киев,1971
- Selenium and Vision. Abdullayev H.B. "Elm", Baku, 1972. Селен и зрение. Абдуллаев Г.Б. и др.изд."Элм", Баку, 1972.
- Selenium limiters. Abdullayev H.B., Academy of Sciences of the Azerbaijan SSR., Baku,1973. Селеновые ограничители. Baku, 1973. Абдуллаев Г.Б. и др.изд. ИФАН, Аз,ССР, Баку, 1973
- Effect of selenium on immunological features of plasma irradiated animals.(Radiobiology). Abdullayev H.B., Academy of Sciences of the Azerbaijan SSR., Baku, 1973. Влияние селена на иммунологические особенности плазмы крови облученных животных. (Радиобиология) Г.Б.Абдуллаев.и др. изд. АН Азерб. ССР., 1973
- Physical Properties of Selenium and Selenium Devices. Abdullayev H.B. Elm, Baku(1974). Физические свойства селена и селеновых приборов. Г.Б.Абдуллаев и др.Баку., изд. Элм., 1974
- Semiconductor converters. Abdullayev H.B. Yarımkeçirici çeviriciləri. Полупроводниковые преобразователи. Баку., Изд. «Элм», 1974
- Selenium in Biology. Abdullayev H.B. "Elm", Baku, 1974. Селен в Биологии. Г.Б.Абдуллаев. Баку., Изд. «Элм», 1974
- Selenium Fritter. Abdullayev H.B., İnst.of Phys.Azerb Ac of Science, Baku, 1974, Фриттер селеновый. Абдуллаев Г.Б. и др. изд. ИФАН Аз.ССР, Баку, 1974
- Physics of Selenium. Abdullayev H.B. Elm, Baku (1975). Физика Селена. Абдуллаев Г.Б. и др. Баку-1975, «Элм».
- Semiconductor rectifiers. Abdullayev H.B. Yarımkeçirici düzləndiricilər. Полупроводниковые выпрямители. Абдуллаев Г.Б., 1978, Изд. «Elm.» АН Азерб.ССР.
- Physics of selenium converters. Abdullayev H.B. "Elm", Baku, 1981, Физика селеновых преобразователей. Г.Б.Абдуллаев и др.Баку.,1981., Изд. «Элм».
- Nizami Gəncəvinin Elm Dünyası. H.B.Abdullayev və b. Azərbaycan dövlət Nəşriyyatı., 1991
- Interaction of laser radiation with semiconductors A B., Abdullayev G.B. "Elm", Baku, 1979, Взаимодействие лазерного излучения с полупроводниками типа А В. Г.Б. Абдуллаев и др. Баку., изд. «Элм», 1979
- Physical Status Solidi 26, 65 Abdullayev H.B. and others (1968).
- The photovoltaic and radiation effects in silicon solar cells. Abdullayev H.B.(1993, Baku).Фотовольтанический и радиационный эффект в кремниевых солнечных элементах. Абдуллаев Г.Б. "Препринт",изд. ИФАН, Аз,ССР, Баку, 1993
- Study the impact of accelerated electrons to SiO2. Abdullayev H.B. 1994., Исследование воздействия ускоренных электронов на SiO2. Aбдуллаев Г.Б.

== Bibliography ==
- Храмов Ю. А. Абдуллаев Гасан Мамедбагир оглы // Физики : Биографический справочник / Под ред. А. И. Ахиезера. — Изд. 2-е, испр. и доп. — М. : Наука, 1983. — С. 5. — 400 с. — 200 000 экз. (in Russian)
- «Akademik Həsən Abdullayev» Ön söz. 2008, Bakı, Azərbaycan nəşriyyatı, s.5-7. (in Azerbaijani)
- С.Г.Багирова, Н.М.Абдуллаев (2023), Основатель Гасан Абдуллаев: ученый, организатор науки, президент Академии наук Азербайджана (Монография), p. 792, ISBN 978-9952-37-628-9 (in Russian)
