= Yuxarı Yayci =

- Municipality
- Location within Azerbaijan
- Coordinates: 39°37′26″N 45°07′32″E
- Country: Azerbaijan
- Autonomous republic: Nakhchivan
- District: Sharur

Population (2005)
  - Total: 927
- Time zone: UTC+4 (AZT)

Yuxarı Yaycı (also, Yuxarı Yəyci, Yukhary Yayji, Yukhary Yayjy, and Yayji) is a village and municipality in the Sharur District of Nakhchivan, Azerbaijan. It is located 20 km in the north-east from the district center, on the bank of the Arpachay River, on the slope of the Daralayaz ridge. Its population is busy with farming and animal husbandry. There are secondary school, cultural house and a medical center in the village. It has a population of 927.

== Etymology ==
Its previous name was Yayji. In the 1920s, the other village which had come from it was named Aşağı Yayci (Lower Yayji), and old village was named Yuxarı Yaycı (Upper Yayji). The first component of the name is reflects the geographical position of the village, and second component is reflects the name of the ancient Turkic tribe of yayci which is origin of Turkic Oghuz tribes.
