= Yaycı =

Yayji
- Municipality
- Azerbaijani: Yaycı
- Location within Azerbaijan
- Coordinates: 38°56′34″N 45°43′55″E
- Country: Azerbaijan
- Autonomous republic: Nakhchivan
- District: Julfa

Population (2005)
  - Total: 5,979
- Time zone: UTC+4 (AZT)

Yaycı (also, Yayji and Persian: یایجی – Yāyjī) is a village and the most populous municipality, except for the capital Julfa, in the Julfa District of Nakhchivan AR, Azerbaijan. It is located 15 km in the east from the district center, on the left bank of the Aras River. Its population is busy with vine-growing, farming and animal husbandry. There are two secondary schools, the technical school, cultural house, three libraries, two kindergartens, communication branch, wine mill and a medical center in the village. It has a population of 5,979.

== Etymology ==
It was registered in Yəyci version, too. The name of the village is related with the ancient Turkic tribe of yayci which is origin of Turkic Oghuz tribes. Yet from ancient times, this tribe lived mainly, in the territory of Nakhchivan and present Armenia. There are also the villages of the Aşağı Yayci (Lower Yayji) and the Yuxarı Yayci (Upper Yayji) in the Sharur District.

== Historical and archaeological monuments ==
=== Yayji ===
Yayji - the place of residence of the Middle Ages in the near the same named village of the Julfa rayon. Archaeological excavations were carried out. The samples of the rich surface material culture are collected. According to the findings, the settlement of Yayji belongs to the 11th-18th centuries.
