= Mark Weichold =

Mark Weichold is an engineer from Texas A&M University at Qatar, Doha. He was named a Fellow of the Institute of Electrical and Electronics Engineers (IEEE) in 2015 for his contributions to the international development of engineering education.

== Education ==
- Ph.D., Texas A&M University, December 1983
