= Eberhard Weichold =

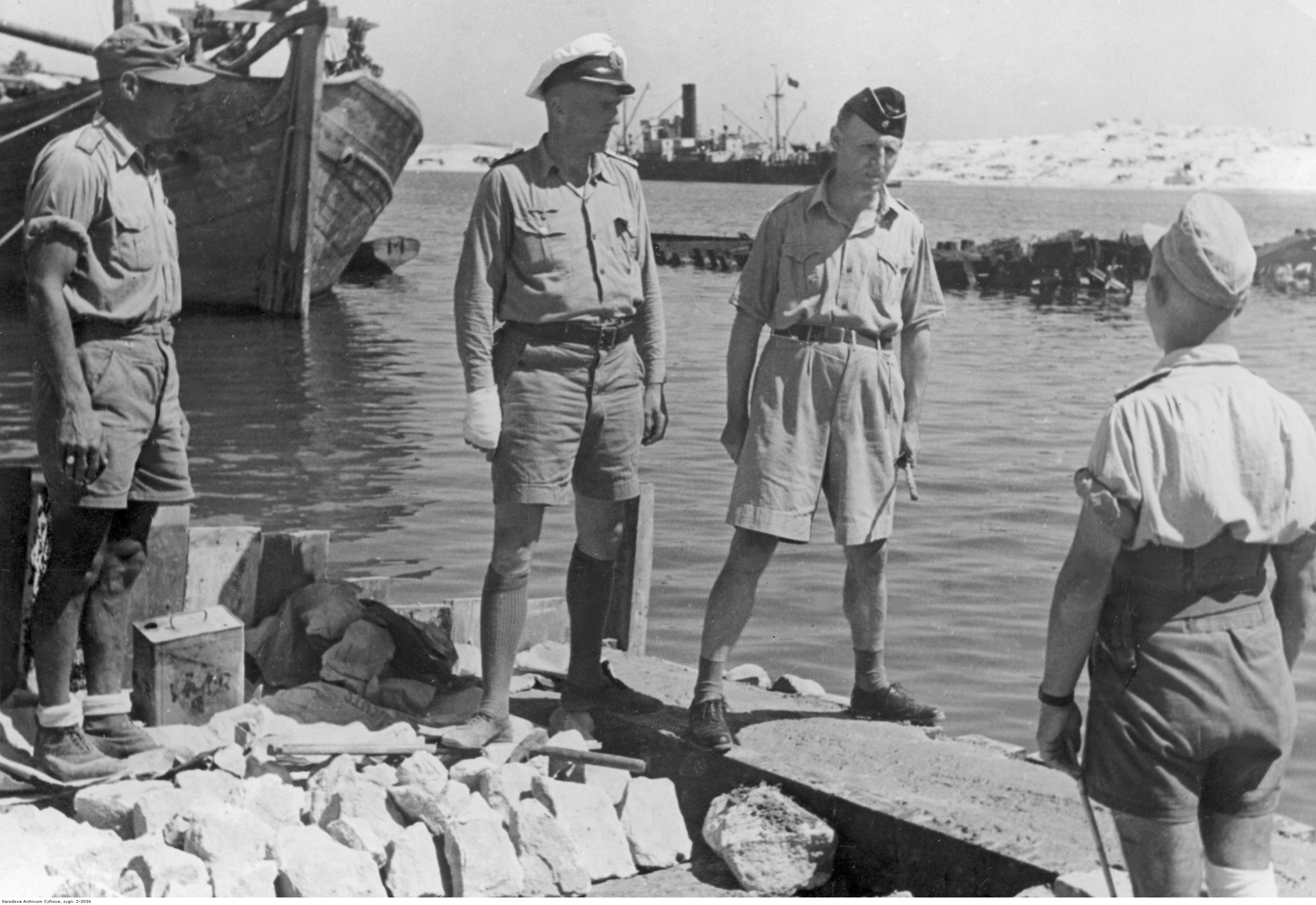
Weichold (second from right) receiving a report in Marsa Matruh in July 1942

Eberhard Weichold (23 August 1891 – 19 December 1960) was a German naval officer of World War I who, among other commands, was captain of the submarine SM UC-22. On 10 August 1918, Weichold sank the SS Polynesien while he was in command of SM UC-22. Seventeen people died. Weichold joined the Imperial German Navy on 1 April 1911 as Seekadett, completed his recruit training on SMS Hertha and came afterwards to Naval Academy Mürwik.

During World War II Weichold, with the rank of rear admiral, served as liaison officer of the Kriegsmarine in the Italian Regia Marina headquarters in Rome.
