= SS Australien =

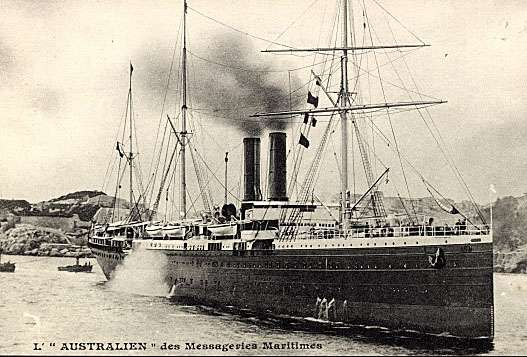

History
- Name: Australien
- Owner: Messageries Maritimes, Marseille
- Builder: Messageries Maritimes, La Ciotat
- Yard number: 66
- Launched: 1889
- Completed: February 1890
- Fate: Sunk on 19 July 1918

General characteristics
- Tonnage: 6,659 GRT
- Length: 152.5 m (500 ft 4 in)
- Beam: 15.1 m (49 ft 6 in)
- Depth: 10.4 m (34 ft 1 in)
- Installed power: 818 nhp
- Propulsion: 1 × 3-cylinder triple-expansion steam engine; 12 × Belleville boilers; Single shaft; 1 × screw
- Sail plan: 3-masted barque rigged
- Speed: 17.5 knots (32.4 km/h; 20.1 mph)

SS Australien was a French passenger ship that was sunk during World War I on 19 July 1918 in the Mediterranean Sea 26 nautical miles (48 km; 30 mi) northeast of Cap Bon, Tunisia, by a torpedo fired by the Imperial German Navy submarine SM UC-54. Three of her 951 passengers and seventeen of her crew died in the sinking.

== See also ==
- SS Polynesien (1890)
