= Robert K. Morgan =

United States Air Force officer

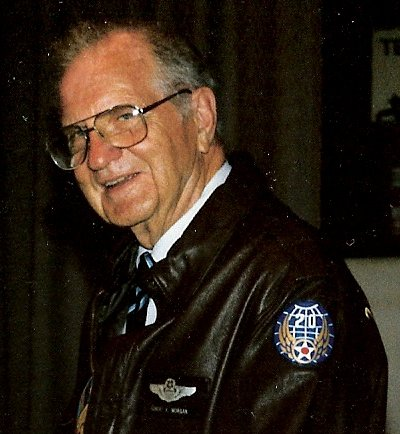
- Major Robert Morgan, was pilot of B-29 Superfortress "Dauntless Dotty" and B-17 Flying Fortress "Memphis Belle"
- Born: July 31, 1918; Asheville, North Carolina
- Died: May 15, 2004 (aged 85); Asheville, North Carolina
- Burial place: Western Carolina Veterans Cemetery; Swannanoa, North Carolina
- Military career
- Allegiance: United States of America
- Branch: United States Army Air Forces
- Service years: 1940–1965
- Rank: Colonel (US)
- Nickname: Andy
- Unit: 91st Bombardment Group ("The Ragged Irregulars")
- Commands: Memphis Belle; Dauntless Dotty
- Conflicts: World War II: European theater; Pacific Ocean theater
- Awards: Distinguished Flying Cross (3); Air Medal (11)

Robert Knight Morgan (July 31, 1918 – May 15, 2004) was a colonel and a Command Pilot in the United States Air Force from Asheville, North Carolina. During World War II, while a captain in the United States Army Air Forces, Morgan was a bomber pilot with the 8th Air Force in the European theater and the aircraft commander of the famous B-17 Flying Fortress, Memphis Belle, flying 25 missions. After completing his European tour, Morgan flew another 26 combat missions in the B-29 Superfortress against Japan in the Pacific Theater.

== Biography ==
Morgan graduated from Christ School, an all-boys preparatory school in Arden, North Carolina, in 1936. He attended the Wharton School of Finance at the University of Pennsylvania and entered the Army Air Corps in 1940. He earned his pilot wings and was commissioned a second lieutenant on December 12, 1941, then after advanced training at Walla Walla Army Air Base, Washington, was assigned to the 324th Bomb Squadron, 91st Bomb Group (RAF Bassingbourn approximately 3 mi (5 km) north of Royston), as a B-17 Flying Fortress pilot. Morgan went overseas as part of the original group of combat crews and flew 25 combat missions over Germany, Belgium, the Netherlands and France, between November 7, 1942, and May 17, 1943.

=== Memphis Belle ===
The Memphis Belle was the second heavy bomber in the Eighth Air Force to complete 25 combat missions in the European Theatre; and was the first to return to the United States as part of a publicity campaign to sell war bonds. In those missions, all of which were daylight raids, the Memphis Belle flew 148 hours, dropped more than 60 tons of bombs and had every major part of the plane replaced at least once. Morgan and his crew were the subjects of a 1944 film documentary, Memphis Belle: A Story of a Flying Fortress.

=== Career ===
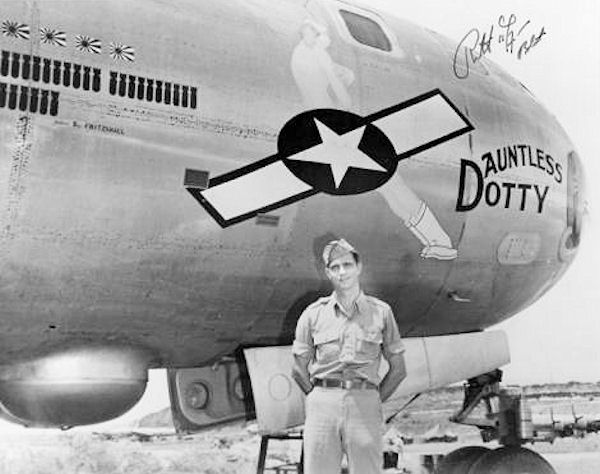
Major Robert K. Morgan with Dauntless Dotty.

Promoted to major, Morgan did a second combat tour commanding the 869th Bomb Squadron, 497th Bomb Group of the Twentieth Air Force in the Pacific Theater where he flew the B-29 Superfortress Dauntless Dotty from Isley Field, Saipan. The aircraft was nicknamed after his third wife, Dorothy Johnson Morgan. On November 24, 1944, he was pilot of the lead plane during the first mission of the XXI Bomber Command to bomb Japan. This mission was commanded by Brigadier General Emmett O'Donnell Jr.

Leaving active duty after World War II, he continued to fly in the Air Force Reserve, achieving command pilot status. Among his military awards were the Distinguished Flying Cross with two oak leaf clusters and the Air Medal with 10 oak leaf clusters. He retired from the Air Force Reserve with the rank of colonel in 1965. In the later 1960s, Morgan operated a car dealership in Martinsville, Virginia called Morgan Volkswagen. He later returned to his hometown of Asheville to retire.

In 2001 Morgan published his autobiography, The Man Who Flew the Memphis Belle: Memoir of a WWII Bomber Pilot, co-written with Ron Powers ISBN 0-525-94610-1.

== Death ==
Morgan was hospitalized April 22, 2004, with a fractured vertebra in his neck after falling outside the Asheville Regional Airport while returning home from what would be his last airshow appearance at the Sun 'n' Fun airshow at Lakeland Linder International Airport in Lakeland, Florida. He died at Mission Hospital on May 15, 2004, from complications due to his injuries, including pneumonia. Morgan was buried at the Western Carolina Veterans Cemetery in Swannanoa, North Carolina.

== Awards and decorations ==
Command Pilot Badge

Distinguished Flying Cross 3d Award
Air Medal 11th Award	Air Force Presidential Unit Citation	American Defense Service Medal
American Campaign Medal	Asiatic-Pacific Campaign Medal 3 campaigns	European-African-Middle Eastern Campaign Medal 5 campaigns
World War II Victory Medal	Air Force Longevity Service Award 4th Award	Armed Forces Reserve Medal 10 years
