= Great Train Wreck of 1918 =

1918 rail transport disaster in Nashville, Tennessee, United States

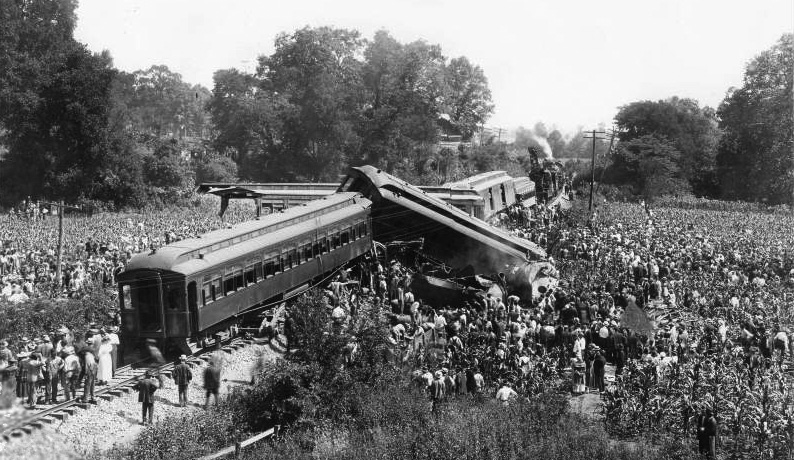

Details
- Date: July 9, 1918; 108 years ago 7:20 am
- Location: Nashville, Tennessee
- Coordinates: 36°07′46″N 86°50′53″W
- Country: United States
- Operator: Nashville, Chattanooga and St. Louis Railway
- Incident type: Collision
- Cause: Human error

Statistics
- Trains: 2
- Deaths: 101
- Injured: 171

The Great Train Wreck of 1918 occurred on July 9, 1918, in Nashville, Tennessee, United States. Two passenger trains, operated by the Nashville, Chattanooga and St. Louis Railway ("NC&StL"), collided head-on, costing at least 101 lives and injuring an additional 171. It is considered the worst rail accident in U.S. history, though estimates of the death toll of this accident overlap with that of the Malbone Street Wreck in Brooklyn, New York, the same year.

The two trains involved were the No. 4, scheduled to depart Nashville for Memphis, Tennessee, at 7:00 a.m.; and the No. 1 from Memphis, about half an hour late for a scheduled arrival in Nashville at 7:10 a.m. At about 7:20 a.m., the two trains collided while traversing a section of single track line known as "Dutchman's Curve" west of downtown Nashville, in the present-day neighborhood of Belle Meade. The trains were each traveling at an estimated 50 to 60 mph (80 to 100 km/h). The impact derailed them both, and destroyed several wooden cars.

An investigation by the Interstate Commerce Commission (ICC) attributed the cause of the accident to several factors, notably serious errors by the crew of train No. 4 and interlocking tower operators, all of whom failed to properly account for the presence of train No. 1 on the line. The ICC also pointed to a lack of a proper system for the accurate determination of train positions and noted that the wooden construction of the cars greatly increased the number of fatalities.

== Incident ==
=== Departures ===
At 7:07 a.m. on the day of the accident, the Nashville, Chattanooga and St. Louis Railway ("NC&StL") train No. 4 departed Union Station in Nashville, bound for Memphis. The train, pulled by locomotive No. 282, a G8a class 4-6-0 ten-wheeler built by Baldwin Locomotive Works in 1905, consisted of two mail and baggage cars and six wooden coaches.

Meanwhile, train No. 1, pulled by locomotive No. 281, also a G8a class 4-6-0 ten-wheeler built by Baldwin in 1905, was heading into Nashville from Memphis. Containing one baggage car, six wooden coaches, and two Pullman sleeping cars of steel construction, train No. 1 had departed McKenzie four hours earlier, and passed Bellevue at 7:09 a.m., thirty-five minutes behind schedule.

=== Approach ===
Both trains required the use of a single-track section approximately 10 miles (16 km) long in the western portion of Davidson County. According to contemporary practices, the inbound train (No. 1) retained the right-of-way. Thus, the railroad dispatch informed the crew of the opposing (No. 4) train that they were to stop in the double-track section if they did not visually identify the passing No. 1 before they reached the interlocking tower known as "Shops Junction", where the single-track section began. The term "Shops" referred to the railroad's massive repair and refueling shops including its largest roundhouse.

While train No. 4 traversed the double-track section, the conductor delegated the responsibility of identifying No. 1 to the remainder of the crew. While collecting tickets, the conductor mistook the sound of a passing switch engine with empty passenger cars as No. 1. The crew either made the same error or were negligent in properly identifying the train.

As No. 4 approached the interlocking tower at Shops Junction, tower operator J. S. Johnson showed a clear signal from the tower's train order signals, indicating all was clear. As he stopped to record the train in his logs, Johnson noticed that there was no entry showing that the opposing train No. 1 had passed. Johnson reported to the dispatcher who telegraphed back, "He meets No. 1 there, can you stop him?" Johnson sounded the emergency whistle, but there was no one at the rear of No. 4 to hear it. The train passed on the assumption that the clear train order board indicated that the line ahead was clear. Also, the engineman and conductor failed to visually inspect the train register at Shops Junction to ascertain as to whether No. 1 had yet arrived. That was required by operating instructions issued by the railroad's management prior to the wreck.

=== Collision ===
Shortly after 7:20 a.m. the two trains collided at Dutchman's Grade near White Bridge Road. It is estimated that the Memphis-bound train was traveling at about 50 mph (80 km/h), while the Nashville-bound train was running at 60 mph (100 km/h). Many of the wooden cars were crushed or hurled sideways. The sound of the collision could be heard two miles (3 km) away.

It was to have been the last trip for the engineer of the Nashville-bound No. 1 train before his retirement.

== Aftermath ==
The Interstate Commerce Commission (ICC) listed the dead at 101, though some reports had the death toll as high as 121. At least 171 people were injured. Many of the victims were Black laborers from Arkansas and Memphis who were coming to work at a gunpowder plant in Old Hickory, outside of Nashville. An estimated count of 50,000 people came to the track that day to help rescue survivors, search for loved ones, or simply witness the tragic scene.

In its official report, the ICC was harsh on the NC&StL. A combination of poor operating practices, human error and lax enforcement of operating rules led to the worst passenger train wreck in U.S. history. Had the tower operator properly left his signal at danger, had the conductor monitored his train's progress rather than entrusting it to a subordinate, or had the crew inspected the train register at Shops Junction as required, the accident would not have happened. The wreck provided the impetus for most railroads to switch to all-steel passenger cars.

In the 1970s, songwriters Bobby Braddock and Rafe Van Hoy told the story of the wreck in the song "The Great Nashville Railroad Disaster (A True Story)". The song was recorded by country music singer David Allan Coe on his 1980 album I've Got Something to Say.

The locomotives involved in the wreck, #281 and #282, were rebuilt in 1919 and continued in service until their retirement in 1947 and 1948 respectively. After their retirement #281 was sold and scrapped in June 1948. #282 was also sold and scrapped in April 1949. None of their sisters, from #280 to #286, survive either.

The track, now located west of Saint Thomas - West Hospital, is still in use under the control of CSX Transportation since the 1980 merger between the Chessie System and the Seaboard Coast Line Railroad.

== See also ==
- Lists of rail accidents
- Andria–Corato train collision, 2016 Italian wreck also caused by mistaking one train for another and failure to make sure a long section of single track was clear.
