= SS Polynesien =

French passenger ship

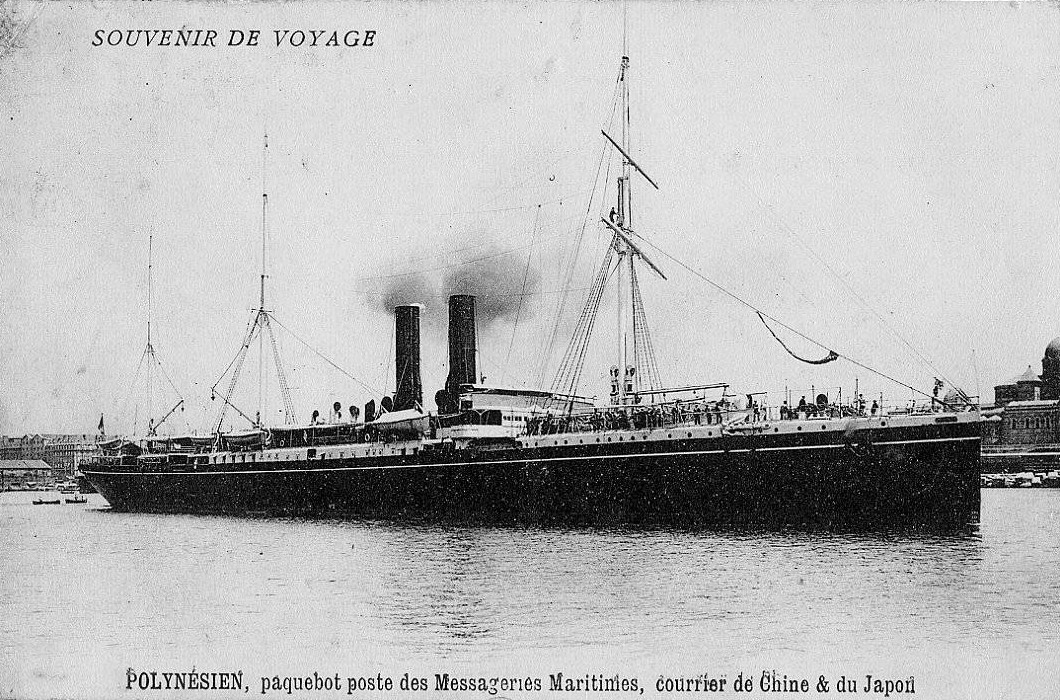

History
- Name: SS Polynesien
- Owner: Messageries Maritimes, Marseille
- Builder: Messageries Maritimes, La Ciotat
- Yard number: 97
- Launched: 1890
- Fate: Sunk on 10 August 1918

General characteristics
- Tonnage: 6,659 gross register tons (GRT)
- Length: 152.5 m (500 ft)
- Beam: 15.1 m (50 ft)
- Depth: 10.4 m (34 ft)
- Installed power: 818 nhp
- Propulsion: 1 × 3-cylinder triple-expansion steam engine; 12 × Belleville boilers; Single shaft; 1 × screw
- Sail plan: 3-masted barque rigged
- Speed: 17.5 kn (20.1 mph)

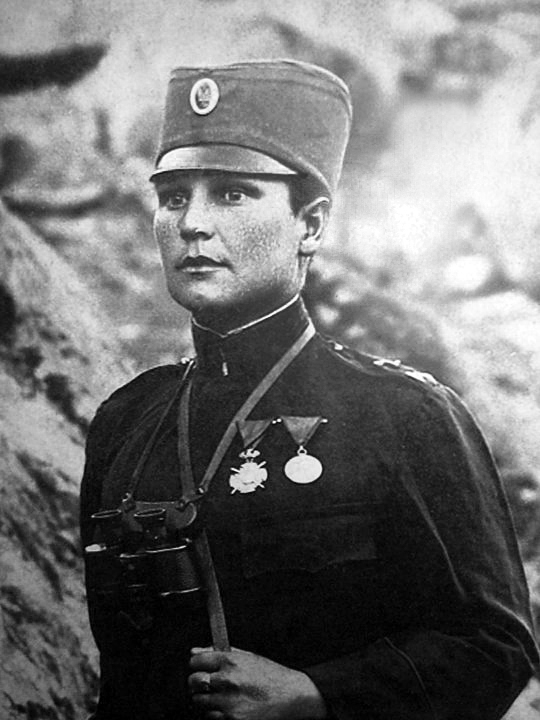
Milunka Savić, who survived the sinking of the Polynesien.

SS Polynesien was a French passenger ship that was sunk on 10 August 1918 in the Mediterranean Sea 7 nautical miles (13 km; 8.1 mi) off Valletta, Malta, by a torpedo launched by SM UC-22, captained by Eberhard Weichold.

The ship was en route from Bizerte, Tunisia, to Thessaloniki, Greece. On board was a detachment of cadets and personnel of the Royal Serbian Army, including Serb heroine Milunka Savić. Most of the cadets survived the sinking, as did Savić, but eleven crew members and six passengers died.

The survivors were taken to Malta and recuperated at Cottonera Hospital.

== See also ==
- SS Australien (1889)
