= Arab Bulletin =

Secret magazine of Middle East politics

- Type: "as often as occasion may require"
- Publisher: Arab Bureau
- Founded: June 6, 1916
- Ceased publication: August 30, 1918
- Circulation: ~25

The Arab Bulletin was a publication published from June 6, 1916 - August 30, 1918 by Britain's Arab Bureau. It was established to provide "a secret magazine of Middle East politics" D. G. Hogarth once described the newspapers editorial policy thus:

Since it was as easy to write it in decent English as in bad, and much more agreeable, the Arab Bulletin had from the first a literary tinge not always present in Intelligence Summaries. Firstly, it aims at giving reasoned, and as far as possible definitive summaries of intelligence, primarily about the Hejaz and the area of the Arab Revolt. Secondly, the Arab Bulletin aims at giving authoritative appreciations of political situations and questions in the area with which it deals at first hand. Thirdly, it aims at recording and so preserving all fresh historical data concerning Arabs and Arabic-speaking lands, and incidentally rescuing from oblivion any older facts which might help to explain the actual situation: likewise, any data of geographical or other scientific interest, which may be brought to light by our penetration of the Arab Countries during the present war. It is part of the Editor´s purpose that a complete file on the Bulletin since its beginning should be indispensable to anyone who hereafter may have to compile for official use a history of the Arabs during the last three years, an Intelligence Handbook of any Arab district or even a map of Arabia.

— D.G. Hogarth

The bulletin was published a few times a month, and 25 people were intended to view it. Among those people were the Foreign Office, The Admiralty and The Director of Military Intelligence.
