= Dauntless Dotty =

1944 Boeing B-29 Superfortress

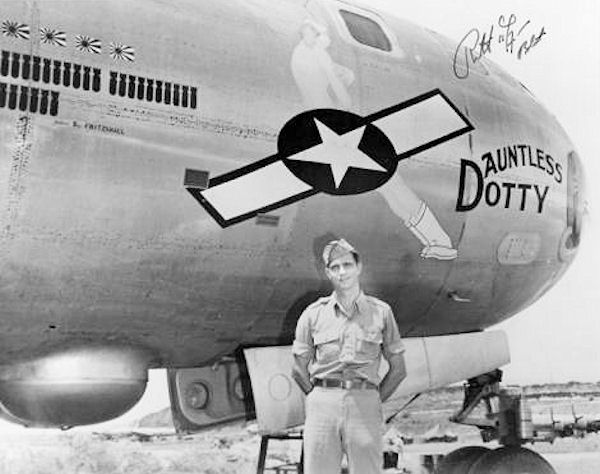
- 869th Bomb Squadron B-29, 42-24592, Dauntless Dotty. Shown is Major Robert Morgan, pilot of the aircraft.

General information
- Type: Boeing B-29-40-BW Superfortress
- Manufacturer: Boeing Airplane Company
- Owners: United States Army Air Force
- Construction number: 4253
- Serial: 42-24592
- Flights: 53 missions
- Total hours: 880 combat hours
- Total distance: 176,000 combat miles

History
- First flight: ca. Jan 1944
- In service: 1944 – 6 June 1945
- Fate: Crashed on takeoff, 6 June 1945, Kwajalein

Dauntless Dotty is the nickname of a Boeing B-29-40-BW Superfortress during the Second World War that led the first B-29 raid on Tokyo on 24 November 1944, the first bombing attack of the Japanese capital since the Doolittle Raid on 18 April 1942.

== Combat history ==
The B-29 that became Dauntless Dotty was a block 40 airframe, manufactured by Boeing at the Wichita, Kansas plant which was built specifically for Superfortress production, and was the twenty-second of a hundred block 40-BWs constructed. It was assigned Army Air Forces serial number 42-24592, and Boeing-Wichita constructors number (c/n) 4253.

The future Dotty was assigned to the 497th Bombardment Group (Very Heavy), with three assigned squadrons, at Pratt Army Air Field, Kansas, in the spring of 1944. The 497th was deployed to the Pacific Theater of Operations (PTO) in September 1944, being assigned to the XXI Bomber Command 73d Bombardment Wing in the Northern Mariana Islands, and stationed at Isely Field, Saipan. The first 497th Superfort arrived there on 17 September. The group began operations in October 1944 with preliminary attacks against Iwo Jima and the Truk Islands.

=== Robert Morgan ===
Major Robert K. Morgan (31 July 1918 – 15 May 2004), was the assigned airplane commander of Dauntless Dotty. From Asheville, North Carolina, Morgan had been the pilot on the majority of the missions flown by the B-17 Flying Fortress Memphis Belle, which was officially designated the "first" bomber to complete 25 operations in the European Theatre of Operations, while flying out of England with the 91st Bomb Group, VIII Bomber Command. (Hell's Angels, of the 303d Bomb Group, actually beat the Belle by one week.) Memphis Belle was the first combat-veteran bomber to return to the United States as part of a publicity campaign to sell war bonds. Morgan flew the plane all over the United States for bond rallies.

=== Return to Tokyo ===
Promoted to major, Morgan flew a second combat tour in the Pacific Theater commanding the 869th Bomb Squadron, 497th Bomb Group. He was assigned B-29 Superfortress 42-24592, tail code 'A1', named Dauntless Dotty after his third wife, Dorothy Johnson Morgan. Completing 26 missions over Japan, he would return home on 24 April 1945.

On 24 November 1944, Morgan had led 111 aircraft of the 73rd Bomb Wing to Tokyo for XXI Bomber Command's first strike against the Japanese mainland. He flew with wing commander Brigadier General Emmett O'Donnell, Jr. in the right seat as mission commander and Vince Evans as lead bombardier. Evans had previously served as Morgan's bombardier aboard the Memphis Belle in England.

"The city was 1,500 miles from the Marianas. Brigadier-General Emmett O’Donnell flying the Dauntless Dotty led 111 B-29s against the Musashima [sic] engine factory. The planes dropped their bombs from 30,000 feet and came across the first of a number of problems – accuracy. The B-29’s were fitted with an excellent bomb aimer – the Norden – but it could not make out its target through low cloud. Also flying at 30,000 feet meant that the planes frequently flew in a jet stream wind that was between 100 and 200 mph which further complicated bomb aiming. Of the 111 planes on the raid, only 24 found the target."

Dotty also participated in another significant Tokyo raid on 9/10 March 1945, when it flew the first night, low level altitude, fire bombing (Operation Meetinghouse) raid. This was the single deadliest air raid of World War II; greater than Dresden, Hiroshima, or Nagasaki as single events.

=== Demise ===
Dauntless Dotty departed Kwajalein at 0306 hrs. on 7 June 1945 for the second leg of a ferry flight back to the United States, commanded by Capt. William A. Kelley, of Tifton, Georgia. Forty seconds after takeoff, the aircraft struck the Pacific Ocean and sank, killing 10 of 13 on board instantly. (MACR 14530) Co-pilot 1st Lt. John Neville, of Bradley, Illinois, tail gunner S/Sgt. Glenn F. Gregory, of Waldron, Indiana, and left gunner S/Sgt. Charles McMurray (also spelt McMurry in one source), of Memphis, Tennessee, were thrown from the wreckage and were recovered by a rescue boat after some 45 minutes in the water.

The wreckage of Dotty and the remains of the ten men who were trapped inside her when she sank have never been located. The wreckage is believed to be at a depth of approximately 6,000 feet. A search for the lost airframe by the National Underwater and Marine Agency Australia has been proposed.
