= Zovaber, Syunik =

Zovaber
- Location within Armenia Location within Syunik Province
- Coordinates: 39°26′N 46°14′E
- Country: Armenia
- Province: Syunik
- Time zone: UTC+4

Zovaber (Armenian: Զովաբեր; also, Yaydzhi, Yaudzhi, and Yayji) is a town in the Syunik Province of Armenia.
