= Aşağı Yayci =

- Municipality
- Location within Azerbaijan
- Coordinates: 39°37′14″N 45°04′49″E
- Country: Azerbaijan
- Autonomous republic: Nakhchivan
- District: Sharur

Population (2005)
  - Total: 1,462
- Time zone: UTC+4 (AZT)

Aşağı Yaycı (also, Aşağı Yəyci, Ashaghy Yayji, and Ashaghy Yayjy) is a village and municipality in the Sharur District of Nakhchivan Autonomous Republic, Azerbaijan. It is located 16 km in the north-east from the district center, on the left bank of the Arpachay River, on the slope of the Daralayaz range. Its population is busy with farming and animal husbandry. There are secondary school, library, cultural house and hospital in the village. It has a population of 1,462. The settlement of Qız qalası (Maiden's Tower) of the Bronze and early Iron Ages is located in the south-west of the village, on the slope of the mountain range.

== Etymology ==
It was registered in Yəyci version, too. The name of the village of Aşağı Yaycı (Lower Yayji) is related with the ancient Turkic tribe of yayci which is origin of Turkic Oghuz tribes. Yet from ancient times, this tribe lived mainly, in the territory of Nakhchivan and present Armenia.
