= September 1918 =

Month in 1918

<<	September 1918					>>
Su	Mo	Tu	We	Th	Fr	Sa
1	2	3	4	5	6	7
8	9	10	11	12	13	14
15	16	17	18	19	20	21
22	23	24	25	26	27	28
29	30

The following events occurred in September 1918:

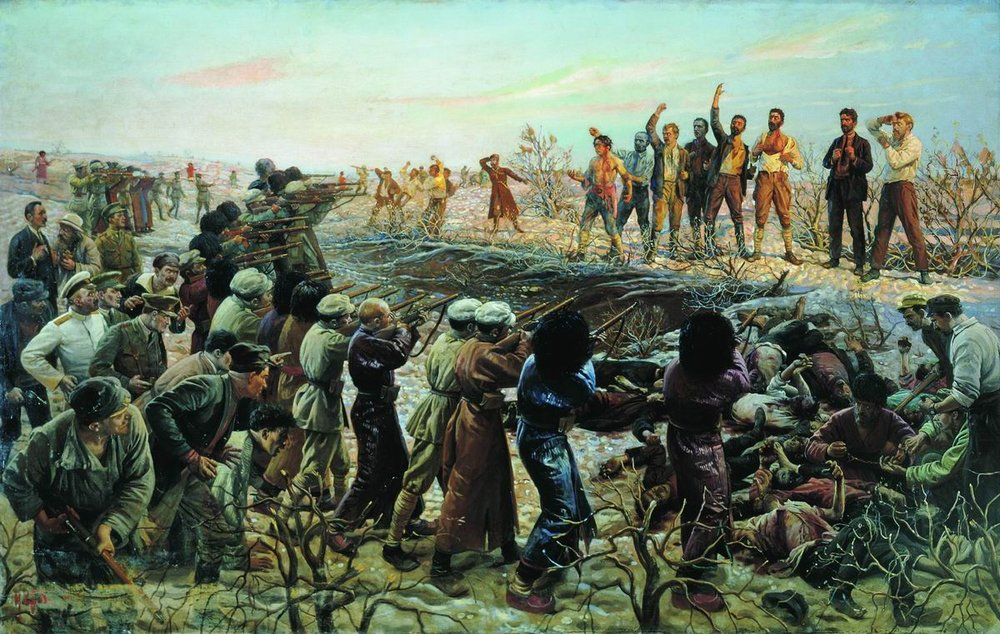
Isaak Brodsky's The Execution of the Twenty Six Baku Commissars, following the Battle of Baku in Azerbaijan.

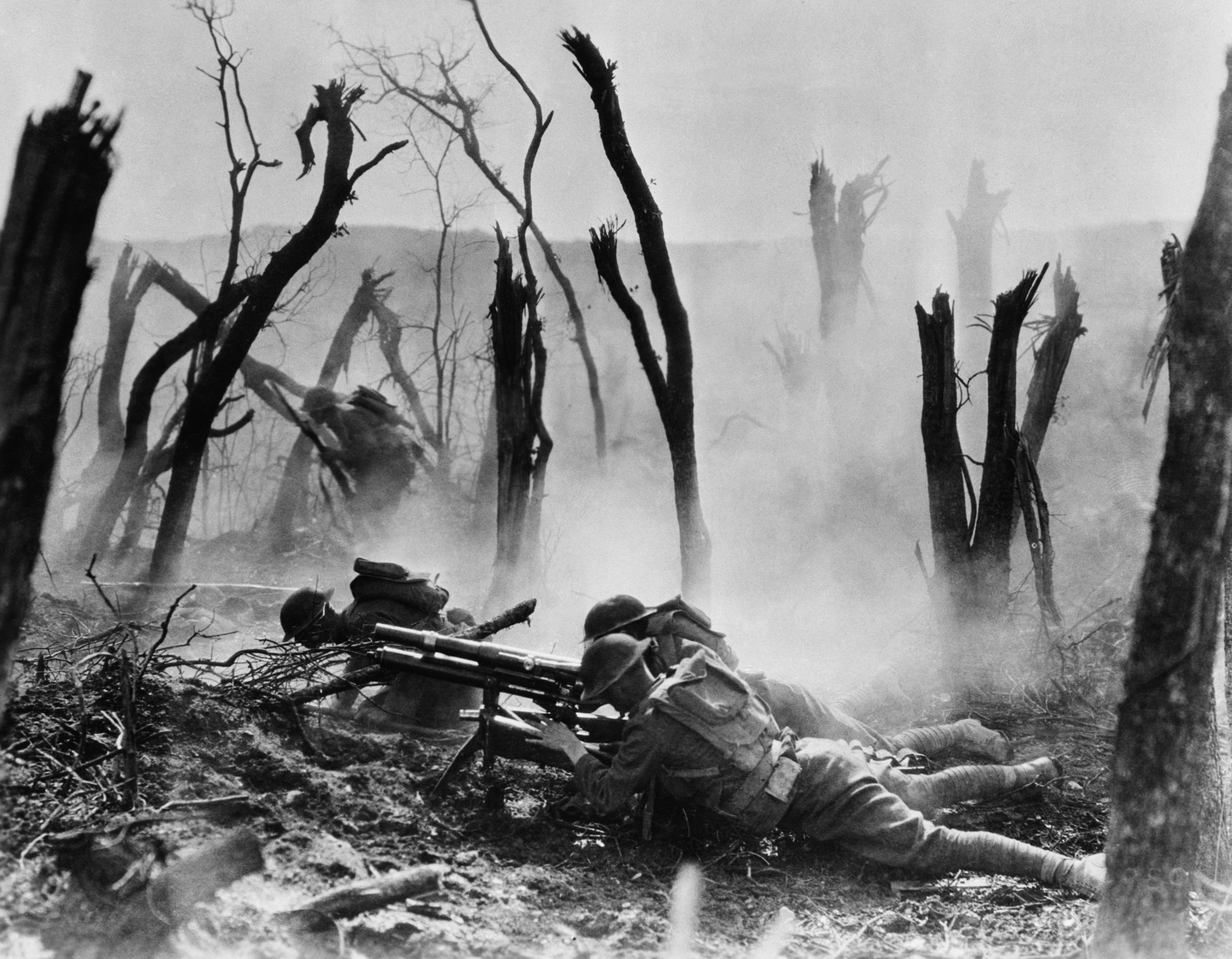
An American gun crew from Regimental Headquarters Company, 23rd Infantry, firing 37mm gun during an advance against German entrenched positions.

== September 1, 1918 (Sunday) ==
- Battle of Mont Saint-Quentin – The Australian Second Division captured most of the commune Péronne, France.
- Second Battle of Bapaume – The New Zealand Division, with support by the British, captured Bancourt Ridge from the Germans to secure the town of Bapaume, France.
- The United States Army 28th Infantry Division defeated German forces after nearly a month of brutal street fighting that destroyed most of the commune of Fismes, France.
- Battle of Baku – British Major-General Lionel Dunsterville, commander of the Allied force in Baku, Azerbaijan, met with leaders of the Centrocaspian Dictatorship and warned if the situation to hold the city from the Islamic Army of the Caucasus did not improve in the next few days, his force would withdraw. He was convinced to stay on until a White Army reinforcement of 600 troops arrived.
- The sports stadium Gressbanen opened in Oslo and became the home of the Ready sports club.
- The Stefan Batory School opened in Warsaw.
- Born:
  - Joe L. Brown, American sports executive, general manager of the Pittsburgh Pirates from 1955 to 1976; in New York City (d. 2010)
  - James D. Martin, American politician, U.S. Representative from Alabama from 1965 to 1967; in Tarrant, Alabama (d. 2017)
  - M. A. G. Osmani, Bangladeshi army officer, commander-in-chief of the Bangladesh Armed Forces during the Bangladesh Liberation War; in Sunamganj District, British India (d. 1984)
  - Igor Kaczurowskyj, Ukrainian poet and literary critic, known for literary criticisms including Literary Genres and Structure and European Literature of the Middle Ages, and poetry collections such as Mirrors of Eternity; in Nizhyn, Ukraine (d. 2013)
- Died:
  - Leonard C. Bailey, 92–93, American entrepreneur and inventor, founder of one of the first African American banks (b. 1825)
  - Francis Oats, 59, English industrialist, chairman of De Beers from 1908 to 1918 (b. 1848)

== September 2, 1918 (Monday) ==
- Battle of Mont Saint-Quentin – Australian forces broke through the German line after capturing the rest of Péronne, France.
- Battle of Drocourt-Quéant Line – The Canadian Corps attacked the German line between the French communes of Drocourt and Quéant, France.
- The Revolutionary Military Council of Soviet Russia was established, chaired by Leon Trotsky, to organize the disparate revolutionary militias into one established army.
- Born: Allen Drury, American journalist and novelist, recipient for the Pulitzer Prize for Fiction for Advise and Consent; in Houston (d. 1998)
- Died: John Forrest, 71, Australian politician, first Premier of Western Australia (b. 1847)

== September 3, 1918 (Tuesday) ==
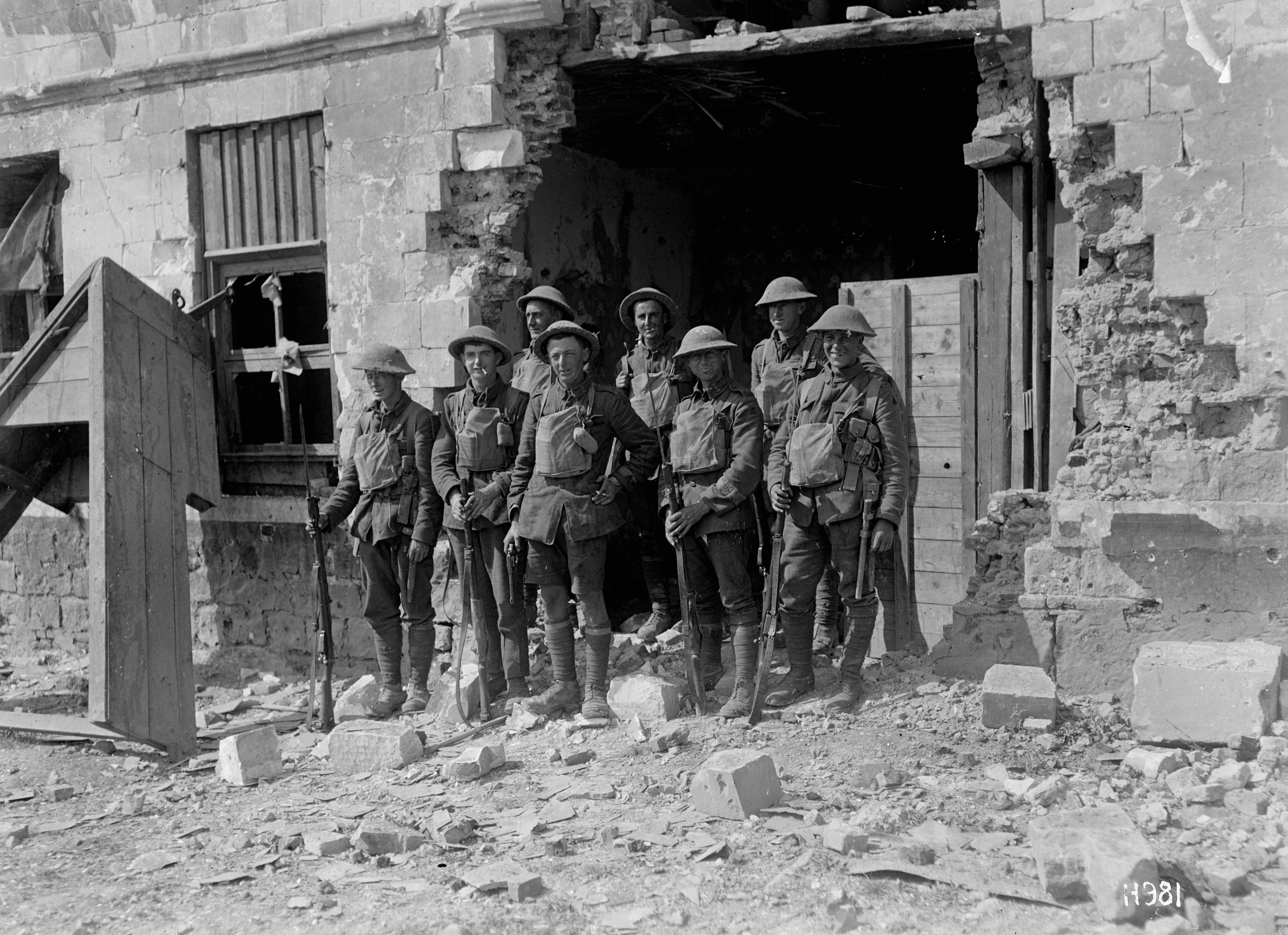
New Zealand soldiers posted in Bapaume, France, captured from the Germans.

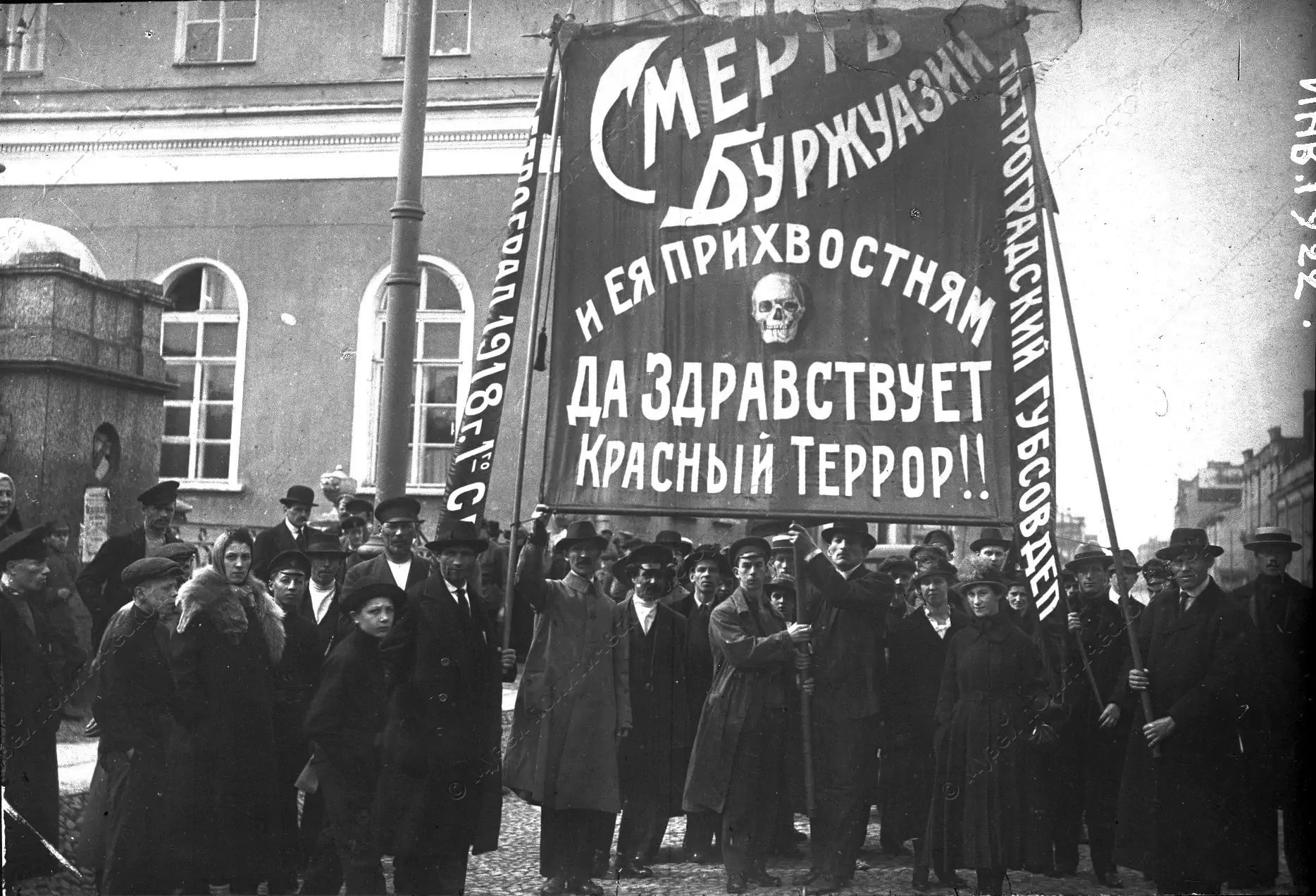
Bolshevik propaganda poster in Petrograd calling for the death of bourgeoisie and their supporters, and praising the Red Terror.

- Second Battle of Bapaume – The battle for Bapaume, France, ended with a victory for New Zealand over Germany, with 800 New Zealand soldiers killed and 2,300 wounded.
- Battle of Mont Saint-Quentin – German forces retreated back to the Hindenburg Line, ending the battle at a cost of 3,000 Australian casualties.
- Battle of Drocourt-Quéant Line – Canadian troops forced the Germans to withdraw 40 miles (64 km) back to the Hindenburg Line; six Canadian soldiers received the Victoria Cross for action during the battle.
- Battle of San Matteo – Austro-Hungarian forces bombarded the San Matteo peak of the Ortler mountain in the Alps in an attempt to take it back from Italian forces. The attack failed with 17 men lost on the Austro-Hungarian side and 10 on the Italian side. The attack was the last offensive carried out by Austria-Hungary in World War I. At an altitude of 2,800 metres, it was the highest battle ever fought until a battle during Kargil War in 1999 was fought at 5,600 metres.
- The Imperial German Navy combined five squadrons to form the world's first navy fighter wing, the Royal Prussian Marine Jagdgeschwader, with Gotthard Sachsenberg as its first commanding officer.
- The Bolshevik government of Russia published the first official announcement of the Red Terror, a period of repression against political opponents, as an "Appeal to the Working Class" in the newspaper Izvestia. One of the first major executions was Fanny Kaplan, a member of the Socialist Revolutionary Party who shot and wounded Vladimir Lenin five days earlier after resolving he was "a traitor to the Revolution".
- Tennis player Robert Lindley Murray defeated Bill Tilden 6–3, 6–1, 7–5 in the final to win his second consecutive title in the U.S. National Championship men's singles at the West Side Tennis Club in Forest Hills, New York.
- The Pike County Agricultural High School was established in Summit, Mississippi on the property of an earlier agricultural school opened in 1908. It began incorporating college level courses in 1929 and became a junior college in 1932. In 1988, it was granted full college status to become the Southwest Mississippi Community College.
- Born: Helen Wagner, American actress, best known for the role of Nancy Hughes in the television soap opera As the World Turns; in Lubbock, Texas (d. 2010)
- Died: Michael J. Garvin, 57, American architect, known for New York City landmarks such as the Haffen Building and the Bronx Borough Courthouse (b. 1861)

== September 4, 1918 (Wednesday) ==
- The United States Army established the 95th Infantry Division at Camp Sherman, Ohio.
- Daily newspaper El País published its first edition in Montevideo, and initially was a mouthpiece for the National Party in Uruguay.
- Born:
  - Paul Harvey, American radio broadcaster, best known for The Rest of the Story radio segments; in Tulsa, Oklahoma (d. 2009)
  - Gerald Wilson, American jazz musician and composer, renowned trumpeter and composer for Duke Ellington, Sarah Vaughan, Ray Charles, Dizzy Gillespie, Ella Fitzgerald, Billie Holiday, and Dinah Washington; in Shelby, Mississippi (d. 2014)
  - John Carrick, Australian politician, cabinet minister of the Malcolm Fraser administration; in Sydney (d. 2018)

== September 5, 1918 (Thursday) ==
- Kazan Operation – The Red Army launched an attack to recapture Kazan, Russia from the White Army.
- North Russia intervention – A second attempt by the British to invade Russian-held territory in East Karelia (located between Russia and Finland) ended in failure, resulting in a mutiny the following day. In all, 93 British soldiers were court-martialled.
- U.S. Navy troopship USS Mount Vernon was hit by a torpedo by German submarine U-82, killing 36 on-board and injuring another 13 in the attack. Accompanying American destroyers forced the submarine away, allowing emergency repairs to get underway that saved Mount Veron and allowed her to return to port under her own power.
- The United States Army established the 97th Infantry Division at Camp Cody, New Mexico.
- Born: Bob Katter Sr., Australian politician, cabinet minister for the William McMahon administration; in South Brisbane, Queensland, Australia (d. 1990)
- Died: Nikolay Maklakov, 46, Russian politician, Minister of the Interior from 1912 to 1915; executed (b. 1871)

== September 6, 1918 (Friday) ==
- Revolutionary Military Council of Soviet Russia consolidated all of its 299 revolutionary militias under one army with Jukums Vācietis as commander-in-chief, leading to the official mobilization of the Red Army.
- North Russia intervention – Revolutionary leader Nikolai Tchaikovsky of the Northern Regional Government was ousted by the military in Arkhangelsk, Russia and incarcerated in a monastery on the nearby Solovetsky Islands.
- The United States Army Air Service established the First Army Observation Group at the Gondreville-sur-Moselle Aerodrome in France to support American forces in the Battle of Saint-Mihiel.
- The Canadian Northern Railway was nationalized after the private railroad declared bankruptcy, and later became part of Canadian National Railway.
- The Church of England established the Diocese of Coventry in England.
- The General Caballero Sport Club was established in Zeballos Cué, Paraguay, and almost immediately its football team starting playing at the Estadio Hugo Bogado Vaceque stadium built for 5,000 spectators the same year.
- Died: Elizabeth Yates, 78, New Zealand politician, mayor of Onehunga, New Zealand, first female mayor in the British Empire (b. 1845)

== September 7, 1918 (Saturday) ==
- An earthquake measuring 8.1 in magnitude struck the Kuril Islands, Russia, triggering a tsunami that killed 23 people.
- The 1st Marine Aviation Force of the United States Marine Corps participated in its first mission with the Northern Bombing Group.
- The South Melbourne Swans defeated the Collingwood Magpies 9.8 (62) to 7.15 (57) to win the Grand Final of the 1918 VFL season.
- John Brian Christopherson published his discovery that antimony potassium tartrate was an effective cure for bilharzia, a disease caused by parasitic flatworms.
- The private Racquet and Tennis Club opened on Park Avenue in New York City. The building was listed in the National Register of Historic Places in 1983.
- Born: Joe Waggonner, American politician, U.S. Representative of Louisiana from 1961 to 1979; in Plain Dealing, Louisiana (d. 2007)
- Died: Morfydd Llwyn Owen, 26, Welsh composer, known for compositions inspired by Welsh folk music including "Gweddi'r Pechadur" and "Suo Gân" (b. 1891)

== September 8, 1918 (Sunday) ==
- A state conference was held in Ufa, Bashkortostan, Russia, with 170 delegates attending to discuss strategies for overthrowing the Soviet government and establish an alternative Russian republic.
- Born:
  - Derek Barton, British chemist, recipient of the Nobel Prize in Chemistry for research into chemical processes including the Barton reaction; in Gravesend, England (d. 1998)
  - Ben Culwell, American artist, member of the abstract expressionism movement in the United States; in San Antonio, Texas (d. 1992)
- Died:
  - Francis Mary of the Cross Jordan, 70, German clergy, founder of the Society of the Divine Savior (b. 1848)
  - Mikael of Wollo, Ethiopian noble, 67–68, Ras of Wollo, Ethiopia under the monarchies of Yohannes and Menelik, father of Lij Iyasu (b. 1850)

== September 9, 1918 (Monday) ==
- A Red Army force of 8,300 men under command of Mikhail Tukhachevsky attacked the People's Army of Komuch of 11,500 men at Simbirsk, Russia.
- Kazan Operation – Soviet naval forces secured a bridgehead outside of Kazan, Russia while the Red Army attacked on two other fronts around the city.
- German submarine SM U-92 struck a mine in the North Sea and sunk with the all 39 crew on board.
- The Ministry of Education, Arts and Sciences was established as part of the Ministries of the Netherlands as a means to resolve the issue of public funding of religious schools.
- Born:
  - Oscar Luigi Scalfaro, Italian state leader, 9th President of Italy; in Novara, Kingdom of Italy (present-day Italy) (d. 2012)
  - Guy de Montlaur, French painter and soldier, member of the Commandos Marine during World War II, member of the cubism and expressionism movements in France, recipient of the Legion of Honour; in Biarritz, France (d. 1977)
  - Jimmy Snyder, American sports broadcaster, best known for his work on The NFL Today; in Steubenville, Ohio (d. 1996)
- Died: Lyman W. V. Kennon, 60, American army officer, commander of the Company "E" 6th Infantry Regiment during the Battle of San Juan Hill, leader U.S. Corps of Engineers to build Benguet Road in the Philippines (b. 1858)

== September 10, 1918 (Tuesday) ==
- French forces reached the outskirt of Saint-Quentin, France, located on the Hindenburg Line.
- Kazan Operation – The Red Army took Kazan, Russia back from the White Army.
- German submarine SM UB-83 was sunk by depth charges from by Royal Navy destroyer Ophelia in the North Sea with the loss of all 37 crew.
- The 11th, 20th, 96th, and 166th Aero Squadrons were organized under the 1st Day Bombardment Group to provide air support for American ground troops at the Battle of Saint-Mihiel.
- The municipality of Dupuy, Quebec was established.
- Died: Carl Peters, 61, German explorer and entrepreneur, founder of the German East Africa Company (b. 1856)

== September 11, 1918 (Wednesday) ==
- The Boston Red Sox defeated the Chicago Cubs to win the World Series by four games to two. It was the last time the Red Sox won a World Series until 2004.
- British heavy engine manufacturers Ruston, Proctor and Company and Richard Hornsby & Sons merged to become Ruston & Hornsby.
- Born:
  - Desmond J. Scott, New Zealand air force officer, commander of the RAF Hawkinge air base during World War II, recipient of the Order of the British Empire, Order of Orange-Nassau, Distinguished Service Order, Distinguished Flying Cross and Croix de Guerre; in Ashburton, New Zealand (d. 1997)
  - William Robertson Desobry, American army officer, commander of the Fifth Corps from 1973 to 1975, five times recipient of the Legion of Merit, the Silver Star and two Bronze Star Medals; in Manila (d. 1996)

== September 12, 1918 (Thursday) ==
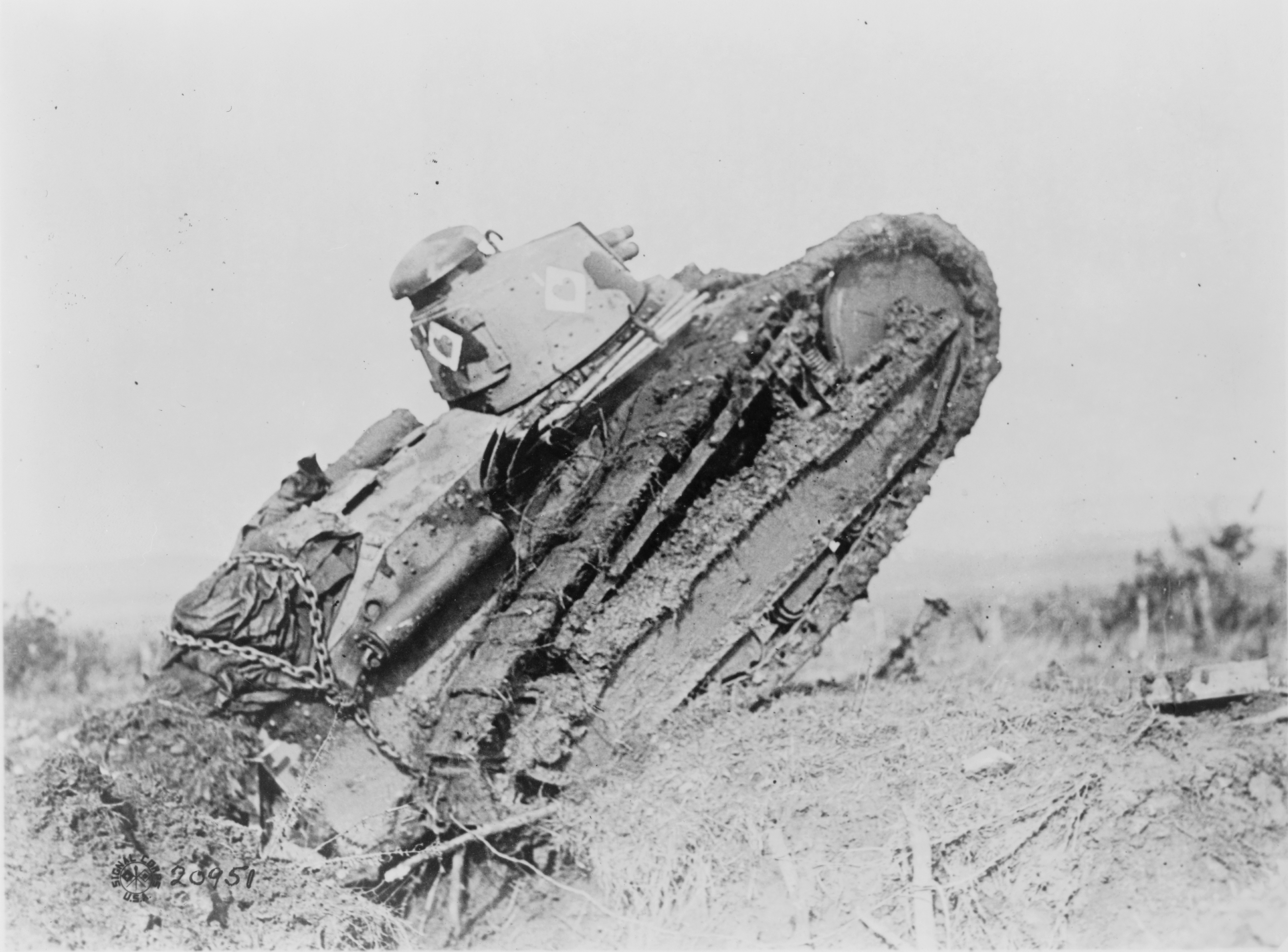
Tank ploughing its way through a trench and starting toward the German line during the Battle of Saint-Mihiel.

- Battle of Saint-Mihiel – American and French troops under command of John J. Pershing launched an attack on the German-held commune of Saint-Mihiel, France. Close to 1,500 American and French aircraft were mobilized to support the ground forces, the largest force of aircraft ever assembled for a single operation.
- Battle of Havrincourt – The British 62nd, 37th, and New Zealand Divisions captured the commune of Havrincourt, France, from the Germans, the first time the Allies pierced the Hindenburg Line.
- The Red Army crossed the Volga River at it pushed back the People's Army of Komuch away from Simbirsk, Russia.
- Royal Navy armed steamer Sarnia was sunk in the Mediterranean Sea off Egypt by German submarine SM U-65 with the loss of 55 crew.
- The Hamburg U-Bahn rail line opened stations in Berne, Farmsen, Ohlstedt, and Wandsbek-Gartenstadt, Hamburg, Germany.
- Born: Valerie Goulding, English-Irish activist and politician, campaigner for disability rights in Ireland and co-founder of the Central Remedial Clinic in Dublin, member of the Irish Senate from 1977 to 1981; in Ightham Mote, Kent, England (d. 2003)
- Died:
  - David Endicott Putnam, 19, American air force officer, member of the 139th Aero Squadron, recipient of the Distinguished Service Cross, Croix de Guerre, and Legion of Honour; killed in action over Limey-Remenauville, France (b. 1898)
  - George Reid, 73, Australian state leader, 4th Prime Minister of Australia, 12th Premier of New South Wales (b. 1845)

== September 13, 1918 (Friday) ==
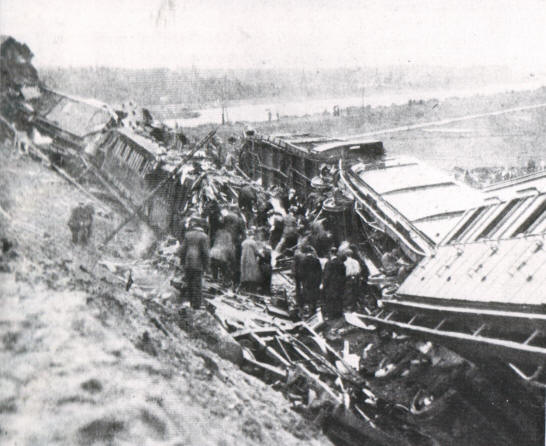
Damage surveyed following a train crash near Weesp, Netherlands.

- Battle of Saint-Mihiel – Nearly all of Saint-Mihiel, France, was captured by American and French forces on the second day of fighting, but further advances here called off due to long, thinning supply lines.
- Battle of Baku – The Islamic Army of the Caucasus began a final assault of Baku, Azerbaijan after nearly two weeks of inactivity.
- A train crash near Weesp, Netherlands killed 41 people and injured 42 others, the largest train disaster in Dutch history until the Harmelen train disaster in 1962.
- Born:
  - Ray Charles, American singer, leader of the Ray Charles Singers that backed Perry Como, best known as male vocalist of the TV sitcom Three's Company theme song "Come and Knock on Our Door"; in Chicago (d. 2015)
  - Dick Haymes, Argentine-American singer, known for hit albums including Rain or Shine and Moondreams; in Buenos Aires (d. 1980)
  - Rosemary Kennedy, American socialite, sister of U.S. President John F. Kennedy; in Brookline, Massachusetts (d. 2005)
- Died:
  - William Nicholson, 73, British army officer, noted commander in various British military campaigns including the Second Boer War, Chief of the General Staff from 1908 to 1912, recipient of the Order of the Bath (b. 1845)
  - Sarah Makin, 72, Australian criminal, convicted with husband John in New South Wales, Australia, for the murder of infant Horace Murray in 1893 (b. 1845)

== September 14, 1918 (Saturday) ==
- Vardar offensive – The Serbian Army with support from France launched its final offensive on the Balkan Front, starting with an attempt to break through the Bulgarian line at Dobro Polje, Macedonia.
- French forces closed in on the Hindenburg Line at Laon, France.
- Battle of Baku – Allied forces abandoned Baku, Azerbaijan to Ottoman forces, leading to the collapse of the Centrocaspian Dictatorship.
- The British aircraft carrier HMS Argus was completed, becoming the first aircraft carrier with an unobstructed flight deck from stem to stern.
- German submarine SM UB-113 left Zeebrugge, West Flanders, Belgium on patrol and disappeared with all 39 crew missing.
- Wuxi Furen High School was established as preparatory school for students going on to St. John's University in Shanghai.
- The Lt Thomas Armstrong Memorial was unveiled in Mirani, Queensland, Australia to honor Lieutenant Thomas Acheson Armstrong of the Australian 33rd Battalion, killed in action at the age of 26 at the First Battle of Passchendaele one year before. The memorial was added to the Queensland Heritage Register in 1992.
- Born: Cachao, Cuban jazz musician, considered the co-creator of the mambo and the descarga music genres; in Havana (d. 2008)

== September 15, 1918 (Sunday) ==
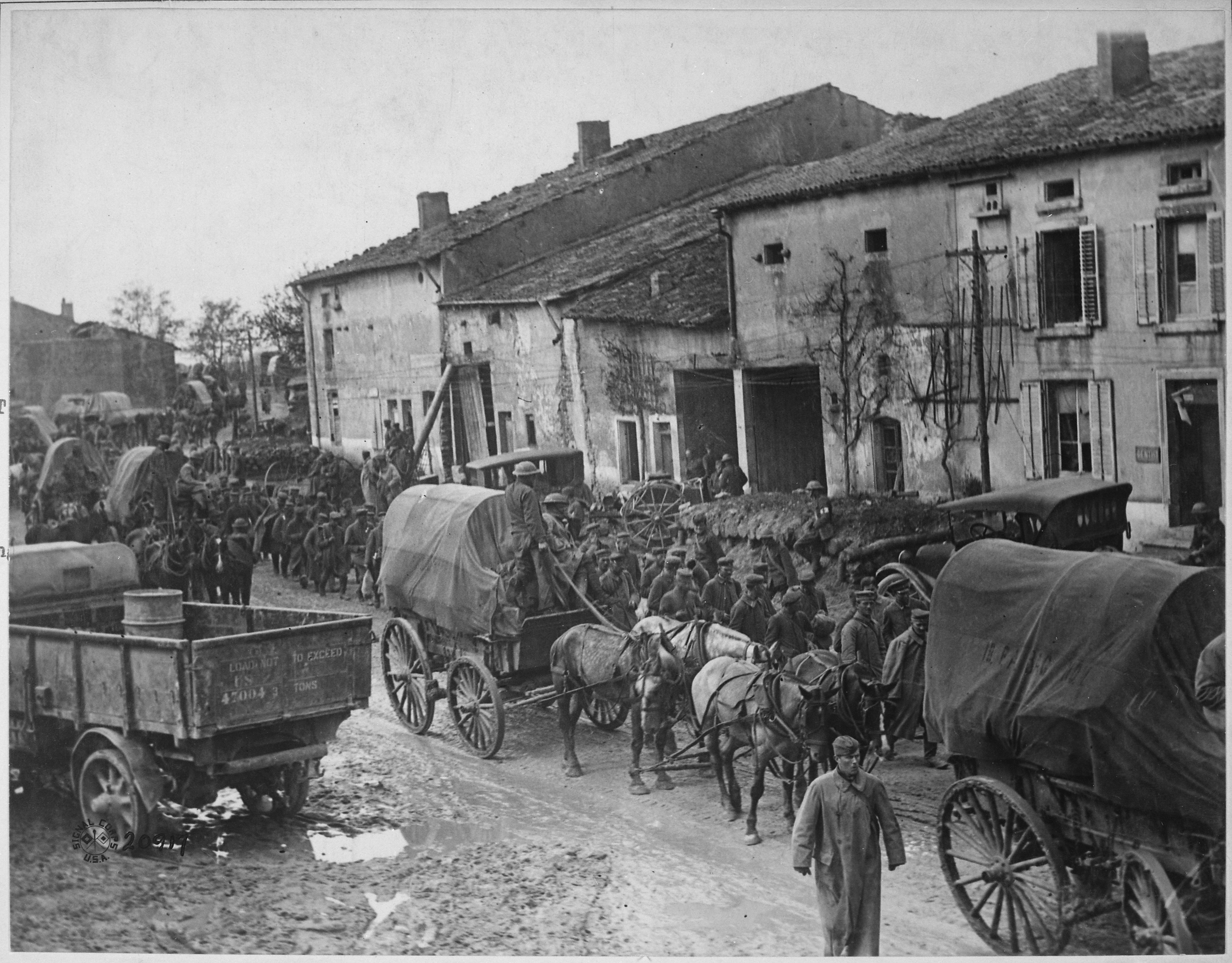
German prisoners escorted by American soldiers during the Battle of Saint-Mihiel.

- September Days – A combined Ottoman and Azerbaijani force captured the port of Baku on the Caspian Sea and overthrew the Centrocaspian Dictatorship. The resulting panic of Armenians attempting to escape the port city led to Ottoman and Azeri troops massacring an estimated 10,000 to 30,000 civilians.
- Battle of Dobro Pole – The Bulgarian Army lost nearly half of its 12,000 troops during the second day of the battle, including 2,689 dead, 3,000 taken prisoner, and 50 out of the 158 artillery pieces knocked out of action. Allied casualties were 1,900.
- Battle of Saint-Mihiel – The battle ended in a major victory for the Allies, with German forces suffering 22,000 casualties including 2,000 killed, 5,500 wounded, and 15,000 taken prisoner. American and French forces totaled 7,000 casualties out of force of 110,000 men including 4,500 killed and 2,500 wounded.
- North Russia intervention – The city of Murmansk, Russia formally became part of the Northern Regional Government.
- British pilot Frank Broome of the No. 151 Squadron shot down a giant German Zeppelin-Staaken bomber over Beugny, France, the second of only two such bombers lost to enemy action in World War I and the only one shot down by an Allied aircraft. Broome was awarded the Distinguished Flying Cross for the achievement.
- The Committee on Public Information, organized under U.S. President Woodrow Wilson began disclosing Russian documents together titled The German-Bolshevik Conspiracy that alleged Russian revolutionary leaders Vladimir Lenin and Leon Trotsky had worked with Germany to orchestrate the November Revolution and force Russia to withdraw from World War I. The documents were later proven to be forgeries.
- Buster Keaton and Fatty Arbuckle released the film short The Cook, which knowingly parodied the Theda Bara movie Salomé that was in production at the same time and released three weeks later.
- The Mexican food chain El Fenix was established in Dallas.
- The state-run newspaper Azerbaijan published its first edition.
- Born:
  - Alfred D. Chandler Jr., American economist, recipient of the Pulitzer Prize for History for The Visible Hand; in Guyencourt, Delaware (d. 2007)
  - Phil Lamason, New Zealand air force officer, negotiated for the transfer of 168 airmen imprisoned at the Buchenwald concentration camp to Stalag Luft III during World War II, recipient of the Distinguished Flying Cross; in Napier, New Zealand (d. 2012)
  - Nipsey Russell, American comedian, best known as a guest panel host for games shows including Match Game, Hollywood Squares, and Pyramid; in Atlanta (d. 2005)

== September 16, 1918 (Monday) ==
- Battle of Dobro Pole – Serbian and Greek forces attempted to overrun the remaining Bulgarian defenses at the village Zborsko, Macedonia but were rebuffed.
- The Red Army launched a second offensive against the People's Army of Komuch, with a force 15,700 men assault the White-held cities of Syzran and Samara along the Volga River in Russia.
- The Mid-European Union was established in the United States as mediator for emerging new nations from World War I.
- Royal Navy monitor ship HMS Glatton caught fire while anchored at Dover, killing 79 of the 305 crew.
- German flying ace Georg von Hantelmann shot down and killed French ace Maurice Boyau while he was attacking German observation balloons. Boyau had 35 kills at the time of his death, making him the fifth-highest-scoring French ace of World War I.
- The American Expeditionary Forces began to set up military hospitals in Paris, with Hospital No. 57 set up to handle 1,800 wounded American soldiers.
- The rail line from Cape-Kootjieskolk to Sakrivier, running 27 miles 21 chains (43.9 kilometres), opened in South Africa.
- The Mount Pleasant railway line opened in between Balhannah and Adelaide, Australia.
- The musical comedy The Girl Behind the Gun, later re-titled Kissing Time, debuted on Broadway at the New Amsterdam Theatre in New York City, for 160 performances before its revision to its present form in 1919. The musical was adapted from a French play by Guy Bolton and P. G. Wodehouse, with music by Ivan Caryll, with Donald Brian in the lead role.
- The first Soviet military decoration, the Order of the Red Banner, was established by the All-Russian Central Executive Committee, and would remain the highest award of the Soviet Union until the Order of Lenin was established in 1930.

== September 17, 1918 (Tuesday) ==
- Battle of Dobro Pole – Serbian and Greek forces succeeded in forcing the Bulgarians to abandon the village of Zborsko, Macedonia in a night attack.
- The town of Kamuthi was looted by 1,000 rioters of neighboring Mukkulathor villages in Tamil Nadu, India in a reprisal against the Nadar people that made up the town. Local police fired on the mob and killed 50 to bring the riot under control, with two policemen also killed. Damages were estimated at 50,000 rupees and penalty tax was established to pay off property losses.
- The Tallinn University of Technology was established in Tallinn, Estonia.
- Born: Chaim Herzog, Irish-Israeli state leader, 6th President of Israel; in Belfast (d. 1997)
- Died:
  - John Murphy Farley, 76, American clergy, Archbishop of the Roman Catholic Archdiocese of New York from 1902 to 1918 (b. 1842)
  - Loyd Wheaton, 80, American army officer, leading commander in the American Civil War and Philippine–American War (b. 1838)

== September 18, 1918 (Wednesday) ==
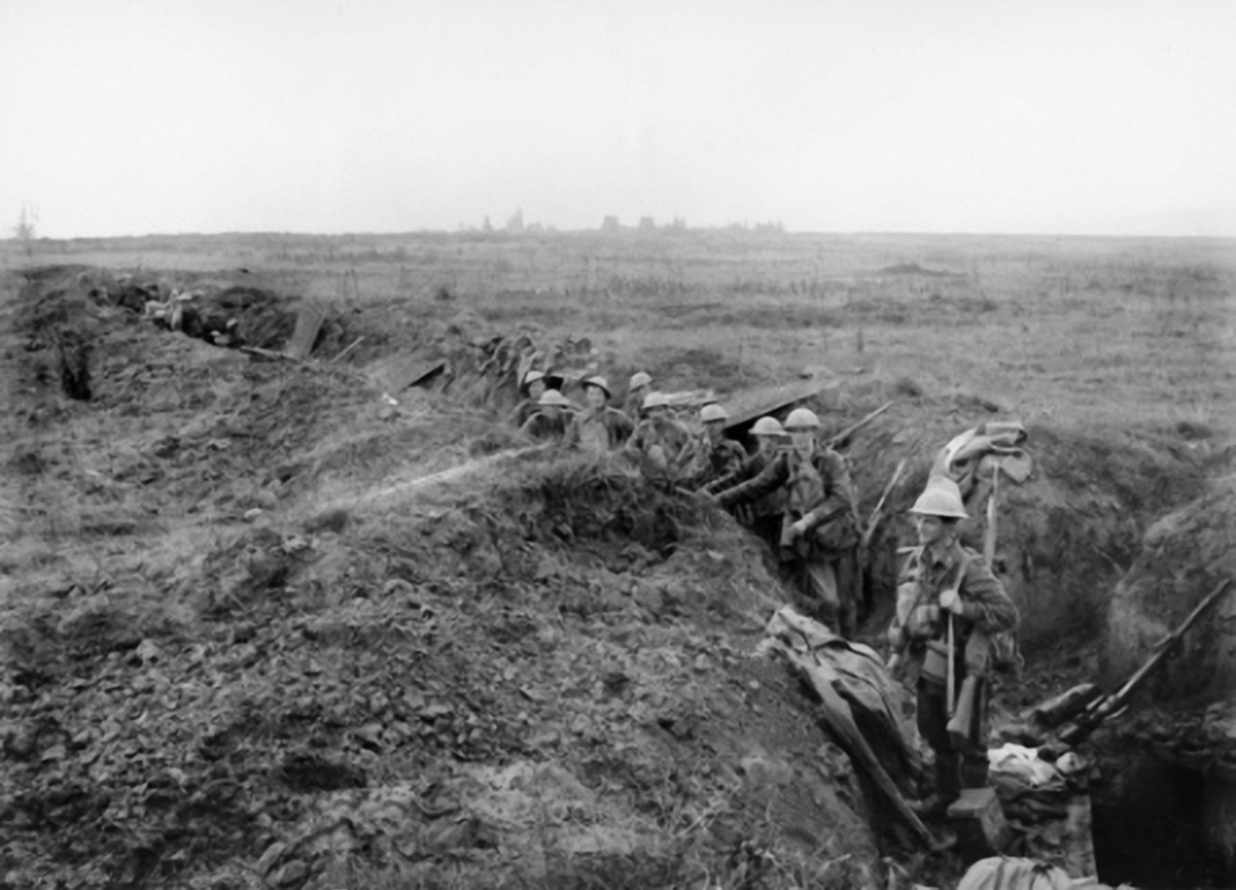
Australian soldiers in the trenches during the Battle of Épehy.

- Battle of Épehy – The First and Fourth Australian Divisions captured the commune of Épehy, France, along with 11,750 German prisoners and 100 guns, as part of a wider British attack on the Hindenburg Line. The Australians lost 1,260 men, including 265 killed and 1,059 wounded.
- Battle of Doiran – British and Greek forces made a second attempt to capture Doiran Lake from the Bulgarian First Army in Macedonia.
- Battle of Dobro Pole – French, Greek and Serbian forces reached the Crna River, having advanced 15 kilometres (9.3 mi) into Macedonia and successfully ending the first part of the Vardar offensive.
- The People's Army of Komuch under command of Vladimir Kappel attempted to recapture Simbirsk, Russia from the Red Army.
- American naval pilot Roland Rholfs set a world altitude record of 34,910 feet (10,640 m) while flying a Curtiss airplane.
- Finnish-American dock worker Olli Kinkkonen was lynched by a Knights of Loyalty mob in Duluth, Minnesota after he publicly renounced his U.S. citizenship in response to the United States participation in World War I. He was taken from his boarding house to Congdon Park where he was tarred and feathered. Two weeks later, he was found hanged from a tree in another city park. Duluth police ruled it a suicide.
- Born:
  - Hector Macpherson Jr., American politician, member of the Oregon State Senate from 1971 to 1974, author of the Oregon Land Conservation and Development Act of 1973; in Corvallis, Oregon (d. 2015)
  - Victor Posner, American business executive, oversaw the first notable "hostile takeover" with the Sharon Steel Corporation in 1969; in Baltimore (d. 2002)
  - Henry Wittenberg, American wrestler, gold medalist at the 1948 Summer Olympics and silver medalist at the 1952 Summer Olympics; in Jersey City, New Jersey (d. 2010)
- Died: Claude Nunney, 25, Canadian soldier, one of the six recipients of the Victoria Cross for action during Battle of Drocourt-Quéant Line on September 2; died from injuries sustained in battle (b. 1892)

== September 19, 1918 (Thursday) ==
- Battle of Megiddo – The Egyptian Expeditionary Force launched its third Transjordan attack with battles against Ottoman forces at Sharon and the Nablus in the Judaean Mountains. As well, the British attacked Tulkarm, Tabsor, and Arara, breaking the Ottoman front line that had stretched from the Mediterranean coast to the Judaean Mountains.
- Battle of Doiran – The Bulgarian First Army repulsed the British and Greek attack on Doiran Lake, inflicting 6,559 British casualties and 7,819 Greek casualties, while only suffering 2,726 casualties.
- The Canadian Air Force was established under the command of Lieutenant Colonel Billy Bishop, the leading war ace of the British Empire. However, the war ended within two months before the force could see action and lack of funding the following year forced the unit to disband. Canada's air force arm was revived in 1924 with the establishment of the Royal Canadian Air Force.
- German submarine SM UB-104 disappeared after being sighted in Lyme Bay, England, with all 36 crew missing.
- The Sopwith Buffalo aircraft was first flown.
- Born: Penelope Mortimer, Welsh writer, author of The Pumpkin Eater; in Flintshire, Wales (d. 1999)
- Died:
  - Liza Lehmann, 56, English composer and singer, known for song compositions including In a Persian Garden and The Daisy Chain, first president of the Society of Women Musicians (b. 1862)
  - Avram Steuerman-Rodion, 45, Romanian poet, noted contributor of the literary magazine Contemporanul (b. 1872)

== September 20, 1918 (Friday) ==
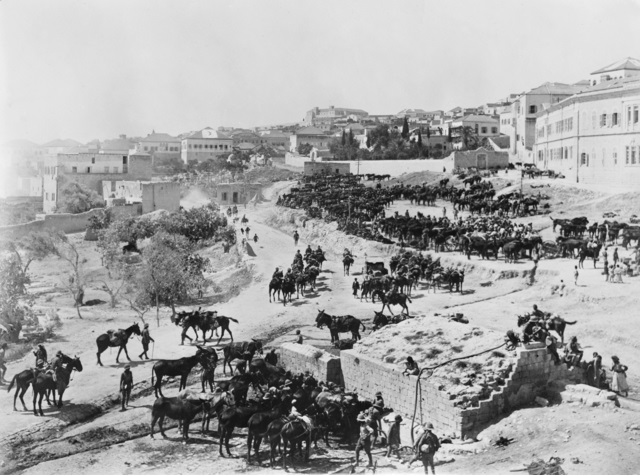
British cavalry occupy Nazareth during the Battle of Megiddo.

- Battle of Megiddo – The Yildirim Army Group of the Ottoman Empire was encircled in the Judaean Mountains of Palestine by the Desert Mounted Corps, after the 5th Cavalry Division attacked Nazareth, the 4th Cavalry Division captured Afulah and Beisan, and the Australian Mounted Division captured Jenin.
- Vardar offensive – Bulgarian forces withdrew from Doiran Lake despite a major victory over the Allies to defend their territory from falling into enemy hands around Dobro Pole, Macedonia.
- British soldiers executed 26 members of the Baku Soviet revolutionary group in Baku, Azerbaijan, including leaders Mashadi Azizbeyov, Meyer Basin, Prokofy Dzhaparidze, Ivan Fioletov, Grigory Korganov, Grigory Petrov, Stepan Shaumian, Mir Hasan Vazirov, and Yakov Zevin.
- The second last meeting of the National Hockey Association was held to formally suspend operations of the sports organization despite objections from Toronto Shamrocks hockey club owner Eddie Livingstone.
- Dutch steel producer Koninklijke Hoogovens was established in The Hague with its steelworks plant in IJmuiden, Netherlands.
- Turkish daily newspaper Akşam published its first edition.
- The municipality of Authier, Quebec was established.
- The Victorian Automobile Chamber of Commerce (VACC) was founded in Bendigo, Australia.

== September 21, 1918 (Saturday) ==
- Battle of Megiddo – RAF airplanes bombed and strafed an Ottoman column, leaving 6 miles of destroy vehicles and wagons and many Ottoman soldiers killed.
- Vardar offensive – Serbian forces advanced on the town of Krivolak, Macedonia to drive a wedge between the German and Bulgarian forces.
- East Fremantle defeated East Perth 11.8 (74) to 8.5 (53) for their tenth West Australian Football League premiership.
- Born:
  - John Gofman, American physicist, member of the Manhattan Project; in Cleveland (d. 2007)
  - John N. McLaughlin, American marine officer, commander of the Fleet Marine Force, Pacific from 1975 to 1977, member of the Military Assistance Command, Vietnam during the Tet Offensive, two-time recipient of the Navy Distinguished Service Medal, three Legion of Merit medals, Bronze Star Medal, and Silver Star; in Charleston, South Carolina (d. 2002)
  - Dmitry Alexandrovich Medvedev, Soviet air force officer, commander of the 486th Fighter Aviation Regiment during World War II, two-time recipient of the Order of Lenin and the Order of the Red Star, six time for the Order of the Red Banner; in Uzlovaya, Russia (d. 1992)

== September 22, 1918 (Sunday) ==
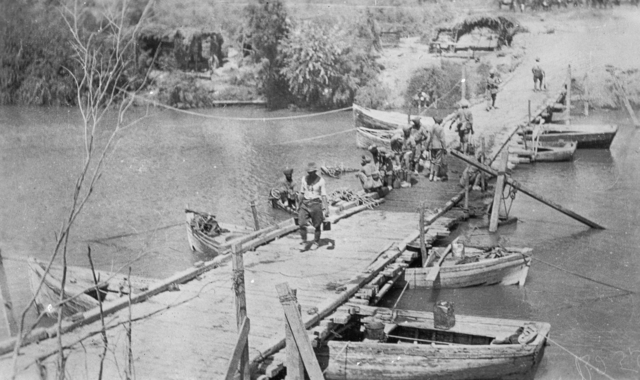
New Zealand use a make shift bridge to cross the Jordan River to capture Jisr ed Damieh during the Battle of Megiddo.

- Battle of Megiddo – Chaytor's Force, named after its commander Major General Edward Chaytor, captured Jisr ed Damieh, Jordan.
- Vardar offensive – Italy joined the offensive against the Central Powers, advanced on the town of Prilep, Macedonia.
- The Red Army established the First Insurgent Division.
- The Catholic Church re-established the Archdiocese of Riga in Latvia.
- The Lincoln Statue was unveiled in Jefferson, Iowa in dedication to the Lincoln Highway built in 1912 and was added to the National Register of Historic Places in 1993.
- Born:
  - Henryk Szeryng, Polish-Mexican violinist, six-time recipient of the Grand Prix du Disque; in Warsaw (d. 1988)
  - Hans Scholl, German resistance leader, founder of the White Rose resistance in Nazi Germany, brother to Sophie Scholl; in Ingersheim, Germany (d. 1943, executed)
- Died: Joseph Thierry, 61, French politician, cabinet minister for the Louis Barthou and Alexandre Ribot administrations (b. 1857)

== September 23, 1918 (Monday) ==
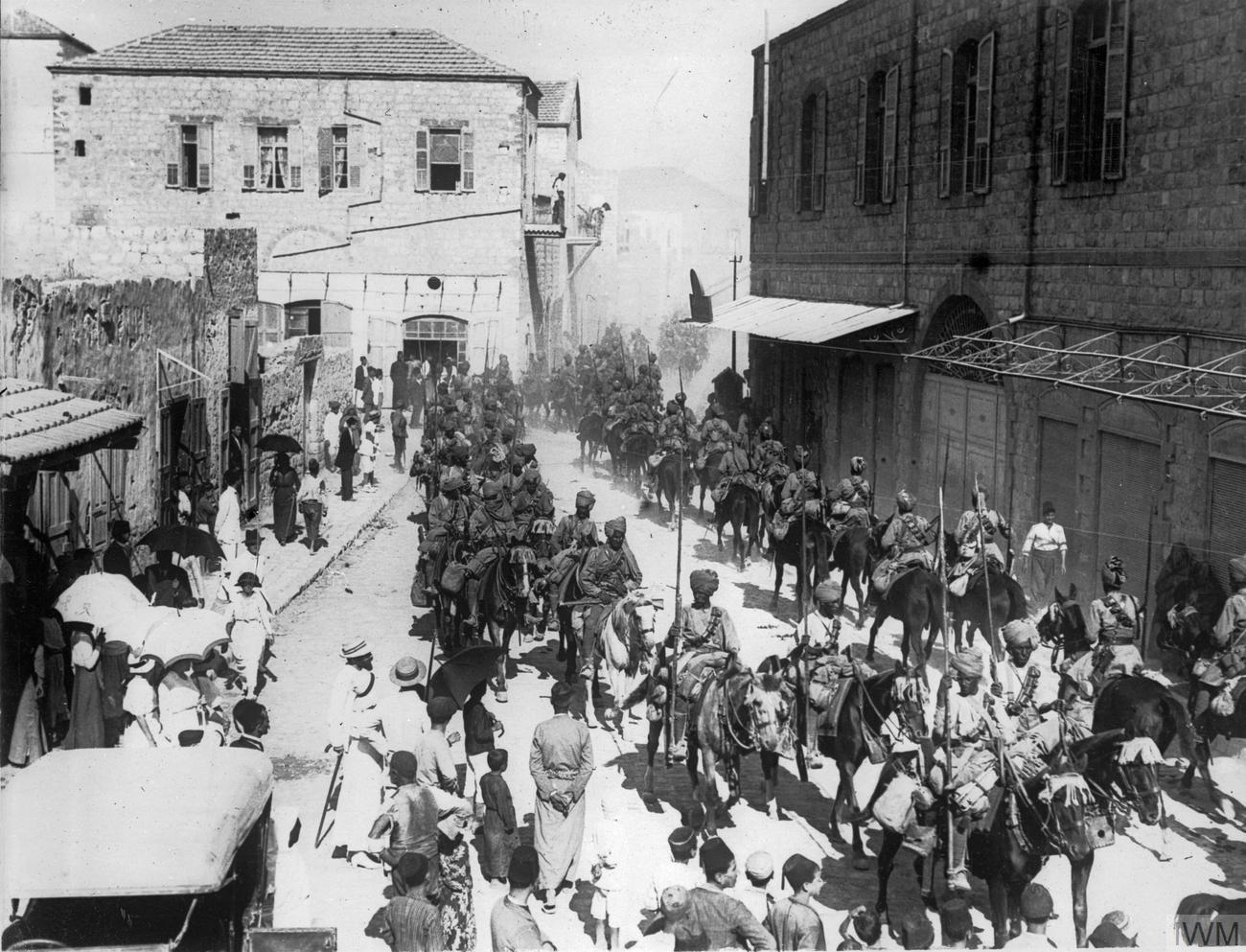
Indian cavalry march through Haifa after capturing the Middle East city during the Battle of Megiddo.

- Battle of Megiddo – The 15th Cavalry Brigade with the Egyptian Expeditionary Force captured Haifa, Palestine from the Ottomans.
- Vardar offensive – Italian forces struck Kičevo, allowing French forces to occupy Prilep, Macedonia.
- The state conference in Ufa, Bashkortostan, Russia elected a Council of Ministers to form a Provisional All-Russian Government in opposition to the Soviet government.
- Russian physicist Abram Ioffe established the State Institute of Roentgenology and Radiology (later renamed the Ioffe Institute after him) in Petrograd.
- Born:
  - Albert Guay, Canadian mass murderer, bombed Canadian Pacific Air Lines Flight 108 in 1949, killing 23 people (d. 1951, executed)
  - Hélio Gelli Pereira, Brazilian-British biologist, leading researcher on adenoviruses;, in Petrópolis, Brazil (d. 1994)

== September 24, 1918 (Tuesday) ==
- Vardar offensive – Bulgarian forces halted the Italian advance at Kruševo, Macedonia.
- The Red Army repulsed counterattacks by People's Army of Komuch at Simbirsk, Russia.
- British fighter pilot Richard Bell Davies completed the first true aircraft carrier landing in history, landing a Sopwith airplane on the bare steel flight deck of HMS Argus in the Firth of Forth.
- The Brazilian Medical Mission landed at Marseilles, France. In the following weeks, it provided critical support for the local medical community when the Spanish flu pandemic hit France, ensuring the continuity of logistical support to the troops at the Western Front.
- American naval pilot David Sinton Ingalls, grand nephew to former U.S. President William Howard Taft, claimed his fifth victory to become the first United States Navy flying ace in history and the only one of World War I.
- U.S. President Woodrow Wilson signed a proclamation to establish the Katmai National Monument in Alaska.
- Born:
  - Hieronim Dekutowski, Polish soldier, member of the Polish paratrooper unit Cichociemni in World War II, and leader of the Freedom and Independence Association; in Dzików, Poland (d. 1949, executed)
  - Audra Lindley, American actress, best known for the role of Helen Roper in the television sitcom Three's Company and The Ropers; in Los Angeles (d. 1997)

== September 25, 1918 (Wednesday) ==
- The Battle of Megiddo – The Australian Mounted Division captured Samakh and Tiberias in the Jordan Valley, while Chaytor's Force defeated the Yildirim Army Group at Amman, Jordan, ending the third Transjordan attack. The battle was a complete disaster for the German and Ottoman forces, with only 6,000 of the 35,000 Yildirim Army Group escaping the Egyptian Expeditionary Force.
- Vardar offensive – Italian forces captured Kruševo, Macedonia while disorder in Kyustendil and Radomir, Bulgaria forced the Bulgarian military command to flee to the Bulgarian capital of Sofia.
- German submarine SM U-156 struck a mine and sank in the North Sea with the loss of all 77 crew.
- The Ministry of Labour was established as part of the Ministries of the Netherlands.
- Born: William P. Bidelman, American astronomer, best known for his contributions to stellar classification; in Los Angeles (d. 2011)
- Died: John Ireland, 80, Irish-American Roman Catholic Priest, first archbishop of the Archdiocese of Saint Paul and Minneapolis (b. 1838)

== September 26, 1918 (Thursday) ==
- Meuse–Argonne offensive – The Allies launched their final major offensive of World War I, with the American Expeditionary Forces under command of John J. Pershing leading the operation with an attack on the German-held commune of Montfaucon-d'Argonne, France.
- The Indian Fourth Cavalry Division charged the Ottoman garrison at Irbid, Jordan. Despite failing to capture their objective and sustaining major casualties, Ottoman forces abandoned the town which allowed the Desert Mounted Corps to set up for an assault on Damascus.
- United States Coast Guard cutter Tampa was torpedoed and sunk in the Bristol Channel by the German submarine SM UB-91 with the loss of all 131 people on board, the greatest loss of life for any US combat vessel in the war.
- Born:
  - Eric Morley, British television host, founder of the Miss World pageant; in Holborn, London, England (d. 2000)
  - Jackie Vernon, Irish football player, defender for the Belfast Celtic, West Bromwich Albion and Crusaders, member of the Ireland national football team from 1944 to 1951, and United Kingdom national football team from 1947 to 1951; in Belfast (d. 1981)
- Died: Georg Simmel, 60, German sociologist, developed formal sociology, author of The Philosophy of Money and The Metropolis and Mental Life (b. 1858)

== September 27, 1918 (Friday) ==
- Battle of the Canal du Nord – The British First and Third Armies, with support from the Canadian Corps, launched a surprise attack on the German-held Canal du Nord in north France, forcing enemy forces to retreat from the east side of the canal.
- The Australian Mounted Division crossed the Jordan River at it continued advance towards Damascus.
- Vardar offensive – The Bulgarian Agrarian National Union took control of many mutinying Bulgarian forces and declared Bulgaria a republic.
- The Ottoman Army executed 250 civilians in Tafas, Syria in an attempt to demoralize the pursuing British force led by T. E. Lawrence. After coming across the massacre, Lawrence ordered his column to pursue and attack the Turkish columns of 2,500 soldiers, capturing at least 250 prisoners.
- The Royal Air Force established air squadrons No. 263, No. 264, No. 266, and No. 267.
- Born: Martin Ryle, English astronomer, recipient of the Nobel Prize in Physics for the development of the radio telescope; in Brighton, England (d. 1984)
- Died:
  - Louise de Bettignies, 38, French spy, headed an intelligence network in France code-named the "Alice Network" from 1914 to 1916 (b. 1880)
  - Fritz Rumey, 27, German air force officer, recipient of the Pour le Mérite; killed in action (b. 1891)

== September 28, 1918 (Saturday) ==
- Fifth Battle of Ypres – The Allies launched a major offensive in Flanders, Belgium, against Germany and gained much of the ground lost up to Passchendaele, Belgium.
- The Red Army defeated the last of the People's Army of Komuch at Simbirsk, Russia, ending with many of the White forces retreating eastward.
- Vardar offensive – Aleksandar Stamboliyski, leader of the Bulgarian Agrarian National Union, organized between 4,000 and 5,000 mutinying Bulgarian soldiers to threaten the Bulgarian capital of Sofia. Meanwhile, the Allies took Veles and other cities in Macedonia and prepared to launch an assault on Uskub.
- North Russia intervention – Revolutionary leader Nikolai Tchaikovsky was freed from imprisonment and allowed to form a new government in Provisional Government of the Northern Region, Russia which included the cities of Arkhangelsk and Murmansk. He was replaced in 1919.
- American marine pilot Everett R. Brewer and observer Harry B. Wershiner become the first United States Marine Corps personnel to shoot down an enemy plane in aerial combat, using an Airco airplane, but both were badly wounded during the engagement.
- Soviet army officer Vasily Blyukher became the first recipient of the Order of the Red Banner (an award he would receive four more times) for his campaigns against the White movement during the Russian Civil War.
- The first performance of Igor Stravinsky's L'Histoire du soldat was conducted by Ernest Ansermet in Lausanne, Switzerland.
- Born:
  - Ángel Labruna, Argentine association football player and manager, second top scorer of the Argentine First Division, forward for the Club Atlético River Plate from 1939 to 1959, member of the Argentina national football team from 1942 to 1958; in Buenos Aires (d. 1983)
  - Arnold Stang, American actor, best known for his comedic roles in Top Cat and It's a Mad, Mad, Mad, Mad World; in New York City (d. 2009)
- Died: Freddie Stowers, 22, American soldier, recipient of the Medal of Honor; killed in action (b. 1896)

== September 29, 1918 (Sunday) ==
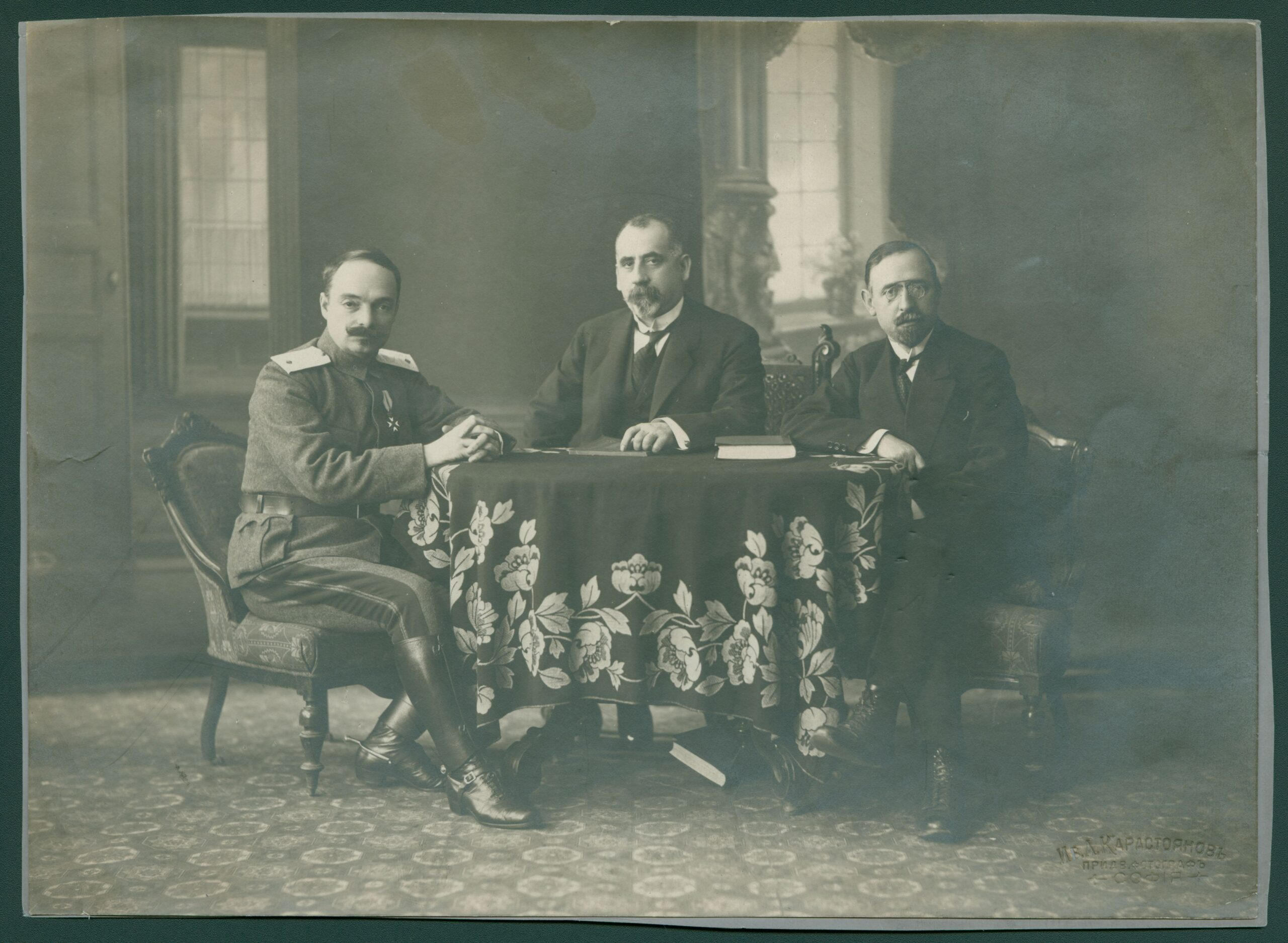
Delegates Major General Ivan Lukov, Andrey Lyapchev and Simeon Radev of Bulgaria at the signing of the Armistice of Salonica.

- Bulgaria signed an armistice with the Allies.
- The Allied Army of the Orient began to liberate the countries of Serbia, Albania and Montenegro that had been held by the Central Powers.
- Vardar offensive – The Allies captured Uskub, Macedonia to end the offensive. The Allies sustained 17,295 casualties during the campaign while Bulgaria had 77,000 troops captured, 3,207 killed and 998 wounded.
- Fifth Battle of Ypres – The Allies captured Messines and all other high ground around Ypres, Belgium.
- Battle of St Quentin Canal – Allied forces attacked and broke through the Hindenburg Line at the Canal de Saint-Quentin in France.
- The Egyptian Expeditionary Force began their month-long pursuit of the remaining Yildirim Army Group of the Ottoman Empire from Haifa, Palestine into territory now part of modern-day Lebanon.
- Terauchi Masatake resigned as Prime Minister of Japan after failing to bring order in the country following weeks of riots over rice prices in rural Japan. Hara Takashi, who openly renounced his noble background in early adulthood, was appointed prime minister to appease the citizenry by becoming the first commoner to be appointed to the office.
- German ground-attack aircraft of Schlachtstaffel 3 intervened to support German troops in danger of being overrun by United States Army forces in the Argonne Forest, France. A German officer on the ground reported that the German air attack caused the American troops to break off their attack and scatter "in wild flight."
- German submarine SM UB-115 was sunk by several Royal Navy vessels in the North Sea, with the loss of all 39 crew.
- American flying ace Frank Luke was killed in action. His 18 victories at the time of his death made him the second-highest-scoring American ace of World War I. The same day, Chapin Barr became the first U.S. Marine pilot to die in aerial combat.
- The first performance of Gustav Holst's orchestral suite The Planets was conducted by Adrian Boult before an invited audience at Queen's Hall in London.
- Died: Lawrence Weathers, 28, New Zealand-born Australian soldier, recipient of the Victoria Cross for action during the Battle of Mont Saint-Quentin; died from battle wounds (b. 1890)

== September 30, 1918 (Monday) ==
- An amendment to the U.S. Constitution to extend voting right to women fell two votes short of the two-thirds necessary for passage in the United States Senate.
- The Desert Mounted Corps staged successful cavalry charges at Kaukab and Kisew, Palestine as part of their advance on Damascus.
- U.S. Navy transport ship USS Ticonderoga was sunk in the Atlantic Ocean by German submarine SM U-152, killing 213 of the 237 people on board.
- German submarine SM U-102 struck a mine and sank in the North Sea with the loss of all 42 crew.
- German submarine SM UB-127 struck a mine and sank in the Atlantic Ocean with the loss of all 34 crew.
- The Royal Air Force established air squadron No. 138.
- Royal Navy torpedo boat HMS Seagull collided with another vessel in the River Clyde, Scotland and sank.
- Born:
  - Giovanni Canestri, Italian clergy, Archbishop of Cagliari from 1984 to 1987 and Archbishop of Genoa from 1987 to 1995; in Castelspina, Italy (d. 2015)
  - Lewis Nixon, American army officer, commander of the 101st Airborne Division during World War II, recipient of the Croix de Guerre and the Bronze Star Medal; in New York City (d. 1995)
- Died:
  - Ingersoll Lockwood, 77, American children's writer, author of the Baron Trump novels (b. 1841)
  - Samuel Lewis Honey, 24, Canadian soldier, recipient of the Victoria Cross for action during the Battle of the Canal du Nord; died from battle wounds (b.1894)
