= Syzran–Samara Operation =

Military operation during the Russian Civil War (September-October 1918)

Syzran-Samara Operation
- Part of the Eastern Front of the Russian Civil War
Date	September 14 to October 9, 1918
Location	Middle Volga River
Result	Red Army victory

Belligerents
Russian SFSR	People's Army of Komuch; Czechoslovaks

Commanders and leaders
(Russian Soviet Federative Socialist Republic) Jukums Vācietis	Vladimir Kappel; Jan Syrový

Strength
About 15,700	About 9,800

Syzran-Samara operation (September 14 - October 9, 1918) was the Red Army's offensive against the People's Army of Komuch during the Russian Civil War.

== Background ==
After losing Simbirsk Volga Army of Whites (commander - Stanislav Čeček) consisted of 2nd Division, Volga group and Khvalynsk group, and Volga Fleet (about 9800 men in common), 60% of them defended Syzran and Khvalynsk.

Red's Eastern Front (commander - Jukums Vācietis) ordered the 1st Army (commander - Mikhail Tukhachevsky) together with Volsk Division and Red Volga Fleet to attack and capture Syzran; 4th Army (commander - Tikhon Khvesin) was ordered to attack Samara. Red forces were about 15700 men in common.

== The battle ==
At first Red's advancing was slow. Volsk Division captured Khvalynsk in September 16 but lost the town after the White's counterattack. Simbirsk Division had to defend Simbirsk against White's counterattack; therefore 1st Army could use two divisions only in its advance to Syzran.

At September 21, the commander of Eastern Front ordered the 4th Army to assist the 1st Army in capturing Syzran, and then to attack Samara. The advance progressed, at September 26, Volsk Division captured Khvalynsk again, Penza Division moved close to Syzran.

The next day, Simbirsk Division took part in advancing after the victory near Simbirsk, and 1st Army became to advance to Syzran by two groups - Northern and Southern. Samara Division of 4th Army advanced to Syzran; other troops of 4th Army advanced to Samara.

On October 1, troops of Samara Division closed from the south to the Syzran-Samara railway and cut it. Simbirsk Division made a forced march and came close to Syzran. On October 1, Syzran was captured by Reds, Whites retreated to Samara.

Volsk Division was removed to the 4th Army, and 4th Army began its advancing to Samara. On October 7, 4th Army together with rebellion workers inside the city captured Samara.

== Aftermath ==
After capturing Syzran and Samara Soviet Republic became able to use the whole Volga River for transportation bread and oil from the southern regions. Army received good starting positions for the advancing to the Buguruslan and Uralsk.

== See also ==
- Bibliography of the Russian Revolution and Civil War
- Outline of the Russian Revolution and Civil War
- Index of articles related to the Russian Revolution and Civil War
- The "Russian" Civil Wars, 1916–1926: Ten Years That Shook the World
- Russia in Flames: War, Revolution, Civil War, 1914–1921
- Russia in Revolution: An Empire in Crisis, 1890 to 1928
- Russia: Revolution and Civil War, 1917—1921
- The Russian Revolution: A New History

== Sources ==
- Article about operation (in Russian)
- Map of the operation
