= Simbirsk Operation =

September 1918 battle of the Russian Civil War

- Part of the Eastern Front of the Russian Civil War
Date	September 1918
Location	Simbirsk
Result	Red Army victory

Belligerents
Russian SFSR	People's Army of Komuch (Bohemia) Czechoslovak Legion

Commanders and leaders
(Russian Soviet Federative Socialist Republic) Mikhail Tukhachevsky (Russian Soviet Federative Socialist Republic) Pēteris Slavens	Vladimir Kappel; Jan Syrový

Strength
About 8,300	About 11,500

The Simbirsk Operation was the Bolshevik Red Army's offensive against Vladimir Kappel's anti-Bolshevik People's Army of Komuch and Czechoslovak Legion. The attack came at Simbirsk, on the Eastern Front of the Russian Civil War, in September 1918. The Bolsheviks re-took the city, forcing Kappel's retreat to Ufa, where his force was absorbed by the Siberian Army.

== Background ==
After the White Army captured Kazan the frontline was not good for the Whites. Near the Kazan 2 - 2.5 thousand men had to hold the 100–120 km of front against about 10 thousand men in two armies (2nd and 5th) of Reds. Whites tried to attack the railway bridge across the Volga River near Sviyazhsk. To support this advance Stanislav Čeček sent Vladimir Kappel's detachment from the Simbirsk to Kazan. On 27 August, Kappel landed on the right bank of Volga near Sviyazhsk and tried to attack the Reds, but was crushed by the counterattack of Latvian Riflemen.

== Battle ==
Exploiting the temporal weakness of White's Simbirsk Group, 1st Army of Reds led by Mikhail Tukhachevsky on 9 September attack towards Simbirsk. On 11 September White's forces were pushed to the bank of Volga, and on 12 September, Simbirsk was captured by the attack from three sides. During the night of 14 September, Simbirsk Division of 1st Army crossed the Volga River and began to advance on the east.

On 18 September, Kappel's Detachment returned from Kazan (captured by Reds on 9 September) and counterattacked. Reds had to return on the right bank. During 18–24 September, Kappel tried to recapture Simbirsk, but his attacks were repulsed by Reds. After coming the 5th Army and Volga Fleet Red Forces crossed the Volga again, and crushed Kappel's Detachment on 28 September.

== Aftermath ==
After losing Kazan and Simbirsk the White Forces were demoralized. On 13 September, they left Volsk and began to quickly retreat from the advancing 1st and 5th Armies of Reds. Simbirsk Group of Whites began its retreat on 29 September. The capture of Kazan and Simbirsk were converted by Red's command into the strategic breakthrough across the whole front.

For the capture of Simbirsk the Simbirsk Division of Reds received the honour title "Iron".

== See also ==
- Bibliography of the Russian Revolution and Civil War
- Outline of the Russian Revolution and Civil War
- Index of articles related to the Russian Revolution and Civil War
- The "Russian" Civil Wars, 1916–1926: Ten Years That Shook the World
- Russia in Flames: War, Revolution, Civil War, 1914–1921
- Russia in Revolution: An Empire in Crisis, 1890 to 1928
- Russia: Revolution and Civil War, 1917—1921
- The Russian Revolution: A New History

== Sources ==
- Н.Е.Какурин, И.И.Вацетис "Гражданская война. 1918-1921" (N.E.Kakurin, I.I.Vacietis "Civil War. 1918-1921") - Sankt-Peterburg, "Polygon" Publishing House, 2002. ISBN 5-89173-150-9
