= Kazan Operation =

1918 Red Army offensive during the Russian Civil War

- Part of Eastern Front of the Russian Civil War
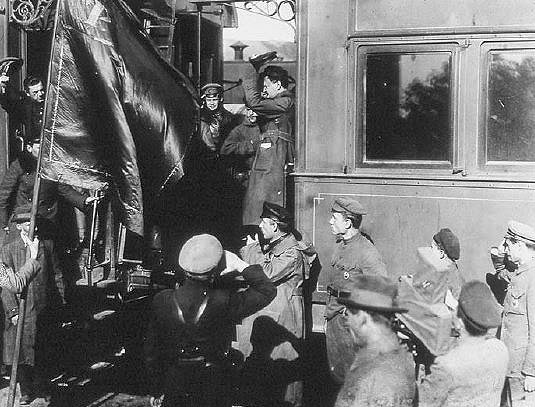
- Trotsky along with his soldiers saluting the red banner near Kazan.
| Date | 5 September 1918 – 10 September 1918 |
| Location | Kazan, Soviet Russia |
| Result | Red Army victory |

Belligerents
| Russian SFSR | People's Army of Komuch; Czechoslovak Legion population of Kazan |

Commanders and leaders
| (Russian Soviet Federative Socialist Republic) Pēteris Slavens (Russian Soviet Federative Socialist Republic) Fyodor Raskolnikov (Russian Soviet Federative Socialist Republic) Woldemar Azin (Russian Soviet Federative Socialist Republic) Nikolai Markin (Russian Soviet Federative Socialist Republic) Sultan-Galiev Mirsaid | Vladimir Kappel; P. A. Stepanov; Josef Švec |

Units involved
| Red Army; 5th Army; 2nd Army; Volga Flotilla | Anti Bolsheviks; People's Army of Komuch; Kazan Komuch; Czechoslovak Legion |

Casualties and losses
| Unknown | Unknown |

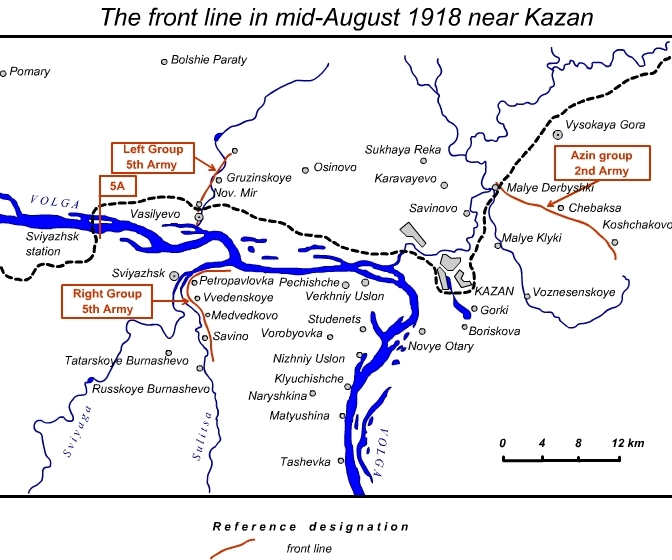
Fronts in August 1918, Kazan outskirts

Kazan Operation was the Red Army's offensive (5–10 September 1918) against the Czechoslovak Legion and the People's Army of Komuch during the Russian Civil War.

== Background ==
Following the capture of Samara by the Czech Legion on 8 June, several members of the Constituent Assembly, which had been dissolved by the Bolsheviks, organized a Committee of Members of the Constituent Assembly (in Russian "Constituent Assembly" was "Uchreditel'noe Sobranie", hence the abbreviation for Committee was "Komuch"). This threatened to form an alternative socialist government to the Bolshevik regime. In August 1918, the Whites occupied Kazan. Bolshevik forces were defeated, and they dispersed to Kazan's neighborhood. The Whites killed the remaining of Bolsheviks in the city, including Mullanur Waxitov.

The Fifth Army has been assigned the task of taking Kazan. Our enemy is trying to break through from Kazan to Nizhny Novgorod, Perm, Vyatka and Vologda, to link up with the Anglo-French troops, and to crush the heart of the workers’ revolution – Moscow. But before Kazan stand the workers’ and peasants’ regiments of the Red Army. They know what their task is: to prevent the enemy from taking a single step forward: to wrest Kazan from his grasp: to throw back the Czech mercenaries and the officer-thugs, drown them in the Volga, and crush their criminal mutiny against the workers’ revolution. In this conflict we are using not only rifles, cannon and machine guns, but also newspapers. For the newspaper is also a weapon. The newspaper binds together all units of the Fifth Army in one thought, one aspiration, one will. Forward to Kazan! Leon Trotsky August 1918

At the beginning of the operation, the Reds' disposition was as follows: To the west of Kazan were the Fifth Army of the Eastern Front under Pēteris Slavens and the Volga Flotilla under Fyodor Raskolnikov; to the east of Kazan was the Arsk group of the Second Army under Woldemar Azin. They opposed the Czechoslovak legion and KomUch People's Army under A. P. Stepanov.

== The battle ==
On September 3 a workers' uprising erupted in Kazan which was liquadated by the army of KOMUCH but it diverged white forces from the front. On the 5th the operation began when the 5th Red Army, with support from the Volga Flotilla advanced towards Kazan by capturing several crucial positions such as Krasnaya Gorka (Yudino), Verkhniy and Nizhniy Uslon. After several days of fighting the red advance was slowing down which caused the direct intervention of Lenin. On September 10, after storming the city from three directions, Red Army troops took control of Kazan.

The majority of Whites managed to sail away via the Volga.

== Aftermath ==
The capturing of Kazan and Simbirsk by the Red Army made continued strategic offensives westwards possible for the Red Army.

== See also ==
- Bibliography of the Russian Revolution and Civil War
- Outline of the Russian Revolution and Civil War
- Index of articles related to the Russian Revolution and Civil War
- The "Russian" Civil Wars, 1916–1926: Ten Years That Shook the World
- Russia in Flames: War, Revolution, Civil War, 1914–1921
- Russia in Revolution: An Empire in Crisis, 1890 to 1928
- Russia: Revolution and Civil War, 1917—1921
- The Russian Revolution: A New History

== Sources ==
- Н.Е.Какурин, И.И.Вацетис "Гражданская война. 1918–1921" (N.E.Kakurin, I.I.Vacietis "Civil War. 1918–1921") – Sankt-Peterburg, "Polygon" Publishing House, 2002. ISBN 5-89173-150-9
