= Eastern Front of the Russian Civil War =

Siberian front of the Russian Civil War

Eastern Front
- Part of the Russian Civil War
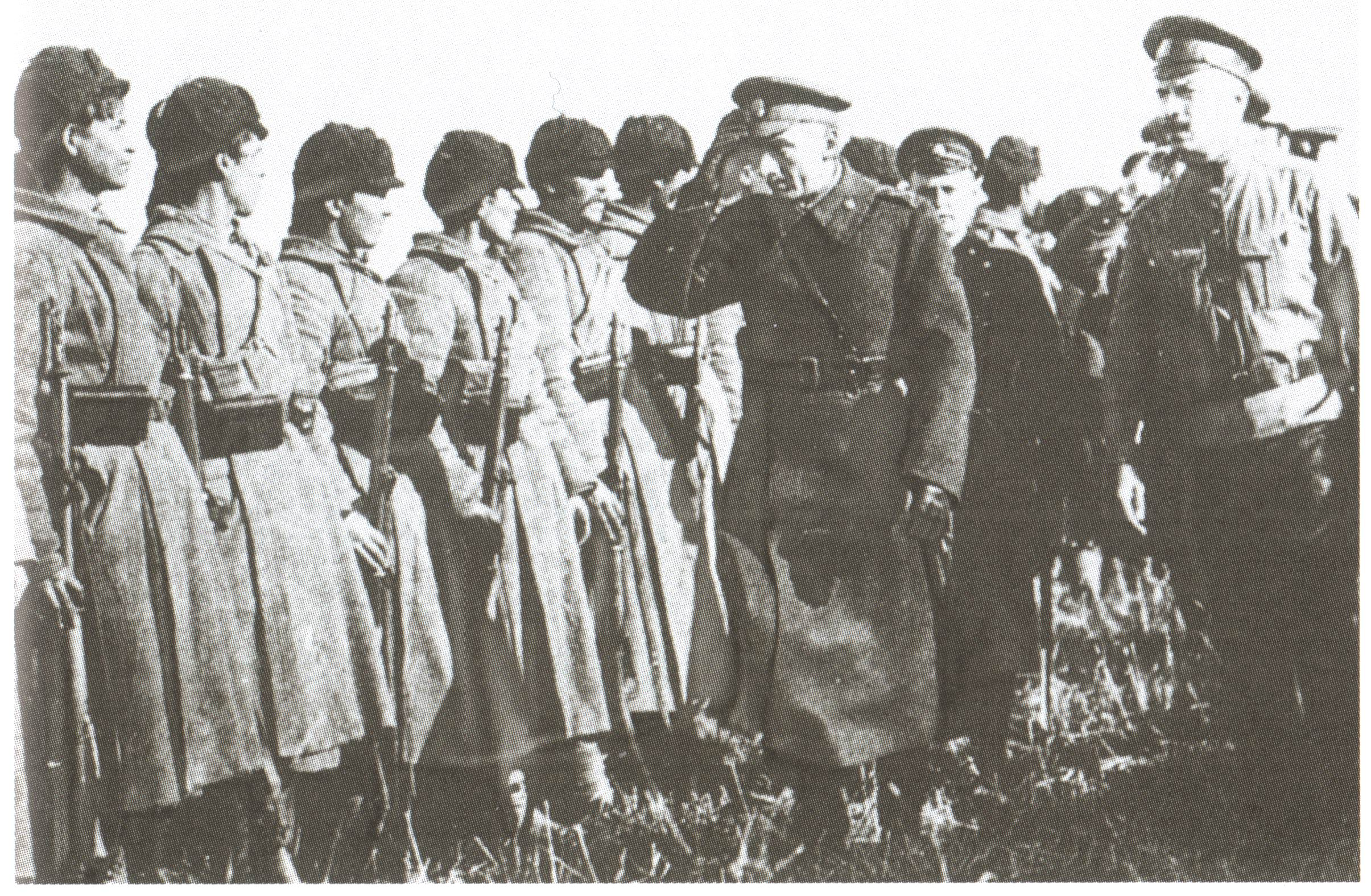
- Kolchak inspecting White Russian troops
Date	14 May 1918 – 16 June 1923
Location	Volga, Ural, Siberia, Far East, Mongolia
Result	Bolshevik victory: Collapse of White and anti-Soviet Resistance

Belligerents
Bolsheviks: Russian SFSR; Far Eastern Republic; Mongolian People's Party; Left SRs (Until March 1918)	White movement: Russian State; Priamur Government (1921–1922); Allied Powers: Japan; Kingdom of Italy; United States; United Kingdom; France; (First Czechoslovak Republic) Czechoslovakia; (Republic of China (1912–1949)) China; Mongolia (1921); Green Ukraine; Buryat-Mongolia; Mongolia

Commanders and leaders
Leon Trotsky; Jukums Vācietis; Sergey Kamenev; Mikhail Muravyov †; Mikhail Tukhachevsky; Mikhail Frunze; Aleksandr Samoylo; Pavel Lebedev; Vasily Blyukher; Ivan Smirnov; Sergey Lazo (executed); A. Krasnoshchyokov; Damdin Sükhbaatar; Khorloogiin Choibalsan	Alexander Kolchak (executed); Grigory Semyonov; Mikhail Diterikhs; Vladimir Kappel †; R. Ungern-Sternberg (executed); Anatoly Pepelyayev; Radola Gajda; Stanislav Čeček; Jan Syrový; Kikuzo Otani; Yui Mitsue; William S. Graves; Alfred Knox; Maurice Janin; Yuri Hlushko-Mova; Bogd Khan

Strength
Total: 600,000; Red Army: 5 Field Armies Internationalist Soldiers: 130,000	Total: 740,000; White Army: 420,000; Siberian Army: 80,000; Czechoslovak Legion: 42,000; People's Army of Komuch: 10,000; Irregulars and Bandits: 50,000; Allied Expeditionary Force: 140,000 Green Ukraine: 5,000

Casualties and losses
150,000–300,000	250,000–400,000

The Russian Civil War spread to the east in May 1918, with a series of revolts along the route of the Trans-Siberian Railway, on the part of the Czechoslovak Legion and officers of the Russian Army. Provisional anti-Bolshevik local governments were formed in many parts of Siberia and the Russian Far East during that summer in the wake of the Czechoslovak Legion uprising, including in Samara, Omsk, Yekaterinburg, and Vladivostok.

The Red Army mounted a counter-offensive in the autumn of 1918. Throughout the winter and spring of 1918/1919, the White Army had dominance over this front. In the summer of 1919, and from then onward, the Red Army defeated the White commander Aleksandr Kolchak. The White Army collapsed in the East as well as on other fronts throughout the winter of 1919/1920. Smaller-scale conflicts in the region went on until as late as 1923.

== Czechoslovak and White uprising ==
In May 1918, soldiers of the Czechoslovak Legion revolted against the Bolsheviks in Chelyabinsk. The revolt was triggered by Trotsky's order to local Bolshevik commanders to disarm the Czechslovaks (in violation of previous agreements) following a confrontation between the Czechslovaks traveling Eastwards and a train full of Austro-Hungarian former POWs traveling westward. The Czechslovak Legion was formed out of Czech and Slovak POWs of the Austro-Hungarian army who volunteered to fight against the empire ruling their homeland. Consequently, The Legion was trying to evacuate to the Western Front to continue the fight against the Central powers, but after the Treaty of Brest-Litovsk in March, the Bolsheviks no longer supported this move. The revolt quickly spread across Siberia, because the Czechoslovaks used the Trans-Siberian Railway to move their troops east quickly and because they were supported by local uprisings instigated by Russian army officers. When the uprising reached Yekaterinburg, the former Tsar and his family who were being held there by the Bolsheviks were executed to prevent their release by the Whites. By the end of August, Vladivostok was in Czechoslovak hands.

The Komuch quickly ordered a general mobilisation, with its troops coming from the anti-Bolshevik forces of the former Volga Military District. The Czechoslovaks allied with Komuch and advanced to the west as they formed a Volga Front, taking key cities in the region, including Kazan, where they captured the tsar's gold reserves which had been moved east for safekeeping.

On 24 January, the Red 4th Army captured Uralsk.

== Internationalist Soldiers ==
Internationalist soldiers played an important role in the Bolshevik Army, they were mostly Hungarians and Germans who became prisoners of war during World War 1 and after the october revolution willingly joined the Bolsheviks. Hungarians were the largest ethnic group among the internationalist soldiers, having 80,000-100,000 soldiers and making up on average about 70% of the Internationalist Army; this percentage was higher on the eastern front. Their willingness to fight against the Czechoslovak Legion and the effectiveness of Weinermann's Hungarian Hussars against White Cossacks greatly helped the Bolsheviks. Many of these Hungarians joined the Bolsheviks to fight against the Czechslovak Legion, whom they viewed as traitors.

Omsk was in the hands of Ligeti Károly, an Internationalist Commander who faced threats by the Czechoslovak Legion to the west and Kolchak's Army to the east. Around June, 1918 Ligeti and his partisans marched 60 kilometres west near Marianovka to hold off the Czechoslovaks. Ligeti's forces had a large clash with the Czechoslovaks and pushed them back despite facing heavy losses. Meanwhile Czechoslovak reinforcements arrived and managed to break through a different area. This endangered Omsk and forced Ligeti to retreat across the Irtysh river, where they joined additional Bolshevik soldiers who were able to keep Kolchak's Army at bay. They were pushed back to the Tatarsk railway station, which they defended for several days despite receiving no reinforcements and being heavily outnumbered. By then Omsk had already fallen to the White Army. The Bolsheviks were eventually forced to retreat along the railway near the Ob. There a local peasant who sympathized with the White Army offered to guide them, only to lead them into an ambush, where most of the partisans and soldiers died; Ligeti was captured by the White Army and later executed.

Internationalist partisans also played a role in the recapturing of Omsk in November of 1919.

The Internationalist soldiers helped conquer and guard many important cities such as Omsk, Tomsk, Ishim, Tashkent, Astrakhan, Kazan, Riga, Irkutsk, Chita and more.

Prominent figures include: Kun Béla, Wienermann Lajos, Szamuely Tibor and Ligeti Károly.

== Provisional White governments ==
In the power vacuum left by the departure of the Bolsheviks multiple White Movement governments were established, including the Committee of Members of the Constituent Assembly (or Komuch) at Samara on 8 June 1918, the Provisional Siberian Government at Omsk on 23 June 1918, and a Provisional Regional Government of the Urals in Yekaterinburg on 25 August 1918. Earlier in January 1918 a Provisional Government of Autonomous Siberia had been created by the Siberian regionalists in Tomsk, but it was broken up by Bolshevik Red Guards, and its leaders fled to Vladivostok, where they reasserted their authority in July 1918. When the State Conference in Ufa led to the creation of the Provisional All-Russian Government in September, all of these governments at least nominally recognized the new authority, and it also had the support of Russia's diplomatic missions abroad.

The Komuch government in Samara and the Provisional Siberian Government organized the Ufa Conference to unite anti-Bolshevik forces, but their alliance was tenuous from the beginning. Komuch was controlled by the Party of Socialist Revolutionaries, whose goal was to restore the Russian Constituent Assembly elected in 1917, which had been dominated by the SRs and had no significant non-socialist representation. The right-wing factions leading the Omsk government, the Constitutional Democrats (Kadets) and the military, had no interest in reviving the Constituent Assembly or cooperating with the socialists, but this was the outcome of the conference. The Provisional All-Russian Government, with a five-member Directory at its head, was created by the Ufa Conference on 23 September 1918 to fight Bolshevism and continue the war against Germany.

The Provisional All-Russian Government united all White Russian forces east of the Urals, at least in name, but only lasted for eight weeks. The Directory was transferred from Ufa to Omsk, where the institutions of the former Provisional Siberian Government were based, and where the Western Allies had established their diplomatic and military missions. The Directory was opposed to this, but having no administrative state of its own, had to rely on the Omsk government to carry out day-to-day functions. Not long after the move to Omsk, a coup d'etat was carried out against the Directory by Admiral Alexander Kolchak, supported by Kadets, army officers, and Cossacks on 18 November 1918. He was declared the Supreme Ruler of Russia without much opposition among the Whites in Siberia, and pledged to wipe out Bolshevism. Kolchak quickly gained the support of the Siberian Army command, Cossack leaders in Siberia and the Far East (including Ataman Grigory Semyonov), and the local industry.

== See also ==
- Bibliography of the Russian Revolution and Civil War
- Outline of the Russian Revolution and Civil War
- Index of articles related to the Russian Revolution and Civil War
- The "Russian" Civil Wars, 1916–1926: Ten Years That Shook the World
- Russia in Flames: War, Revolution, Civil War, 1914–1921
- Russia in Revolution: An Empire in Crisis, 1890 to 1928
- Russia: Revolution and Civil War, 1917—1921
- The Russian Revolution: A New History
- Far Eastern Front in the Russian Civil War
