= Revolt of the Czechoslovak Legion =

1918–1920 Russian Civil War campaign

- Part of the Eastern Front of the Russian Civil War and World War I
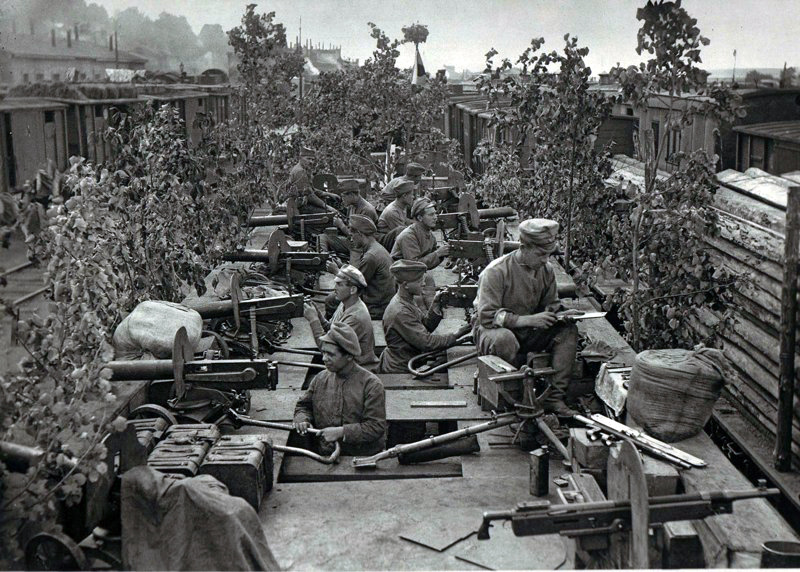
- An armored train with Czechoslovak Legion soldiers on the Trans-Siberian Railway, July 1918
Date	14 May 1918 – October 1918; September 1920 (Legion withdrawal)
Location	Former Russian Empire
Result	See aftermath

Belligerents
Russian SFSR	Czechoslovak Legion (Belgium) Expeditionary Corps (United Kingdom of Great Britain and Ireland) Expeditionary Force; Supported by: White Movement

Commanders and leaders
Leon Trotsky; Jukums Vācietis; Sergey Kamenev; Mikhail Muravyov †; Alexander Samoylo; Vasily Blyukher; Mikhail Frunze; Mikhail Tukhachevsky; Reingold Berzin; Filipp Goloshchyokin	Radola Gajda; Stanislav Čeček; Sergey Voytsekhovsky; Jan Syrový; Vladimir Kappel; Mikhail Diterikhs

Strength
600,000 men (Peak; in 1920)	42,000 men (1918)

Casualties and losses
5,000 killed 3,800 prisoners	4,000 killed and missing

The revolt of the Czechoslovak Legion comprised the armed actions of the Czechoslovak Legion in the Russian Civil War against Bolshevik authorities, beginning in May 1918 and persisting through evacuation of the Legion from Siberia to Europe in 1920. The revolt, occurring in Volga, Ural, and Siberia regions along the Trans-Siberian Railway, was a reaction to a threat initiated by the Bolsheviks partly as a consequence of the Treaty of Brest-Litovsk. One major secondary consequence of victories by the Legion over the Bolsheviks was to catalyze anti-Bolshevik activity in Siberia, particularly of the Committee of Members of the Constituent Assembly, and to provide a major boost for the anti-Bolshevik or White forces, likely protracting the Russian Civil War.

== Background ==
Soon after the outbreak of World War I, ethnic Czechs and Slovaks living in the Russian Empire petitioned Tsar Nicholas II to create a force, in the service of the Russian Empire, to fight against Austria-Hungary. Motivations were mixed. Austria-Hungary, a multi-ethnic empire, included the homelands of the Czechs and Slovaks, but petitioners regarded it as suppressing the nationalism and aspirations of the Czech and Slovak peoples and preferred to fight against Austria-Hungary for independence. As enemy aliens in a hostile empire, they risked losing property and being interned, regardless of their opinion of their empire of origin.

Initially, a force of four companies was raised. Russian victories over Austria-Hungary, particularly early in the war, soon yielded a pool of prisoners of war (POW), and in 1916, Russian authorities began to recruit among them to grow the Czechoslovak Legion, adding two regiments. The Czechoslovak National Council in Paris promoted these efforts with official French endorsement. As war continued, loyalty to Austria-Hungary by its various minority nationalities weakened. By the end of 1917, the Legion in Russia had more than 60,000 soldiers.

After the February Revolution in 1917, the Russian Republic replaced the Russian Empire. After the October Revolution in 1917, which brought the Bolsheviks to power and signaled an imminent end to Russian belligerency, the situation of the Legion became complex. In January 1918, United States President Wilson issued the Fourteen Points, explicitly articulating in the tenth point American support for the dissolution of Austria-Hungary with self-determination by ethnicity.

In February, Bolshevik authorities in Ukraine granted the Legion permission to withdraw from Russia, by means of a lengthy rail journey to Vladivostok after lengthy negotiations. On 18 February, before the Czechoslovaks had left Ukraine, the Central Powers launched Operation Faustschlag on the Eastern Front to force the Bolsheviks to accept its terms for peace. In early March, the Legion defeated a numerically superior German force attempting to destroy it in the Battle of Bakhmach, fought northeast of Kiev. Defeat likely would have implied summary execution for the soldiers of the Legion, as traitors to Austria-Hungary.

After the Legion succeeded in leaving Ukraine eastbound, executing a fighting withdrawal, representatives of the Czechoslovak National Council continued to negotiate with Bolshevik authorities in Moscow and Penza to facilitate evacuation. On 25 March, the two sides signed the Penza Agreement, in which the Legion was to surrender all but personal guard weapons in exchange for rail passage to Vladivostok.

The Legion and the Bolsheviks distrusted each other. Leaders of the Legion suspected the Bolsheviks of seeking favor with the Central Powers, while the Bolsheviks viewed the Legion as a threat, a potential tool for anti-Bolshevik intervention by the Allies, while simultaneously seeking to use the Legion to manifest just enough support for the Allies to prevent them from intervening on the pretext that the Bolsheviks were too pro-German. At the same time, the Bolsheviks, in desperate need of professional troops, tried to convince the Legion to incorporate itself to the Red Army. The slow evacuation by Trans-Siberian Railway was exacerbated by transportation shortages: as agreed in the Treaty of Brest-Litovsk, the Bolsheviks prioritized the westbound repatriation of German, Austrian, and Hungarian POWs.

== Chronology ==
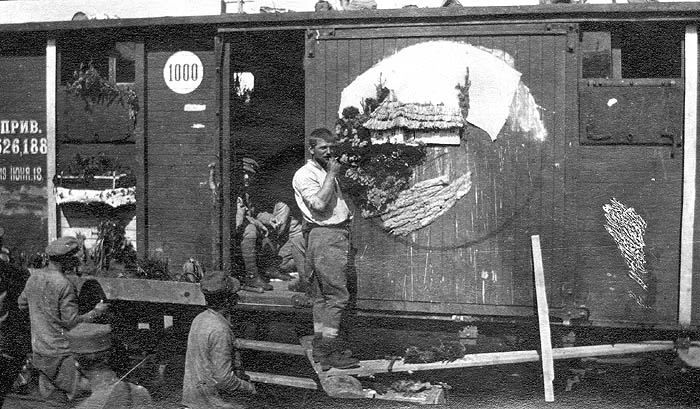
"Quarter" of the Czechoslovak Legion

In May of 1918, as Legion troops slowly traveled eastward by rail under insecure, tense conditions, former POWs who remained loyal to the Central Powers, including even a few Czechs and Slovaks, traveled westward with priority under explicit Bolshevik protection. On 14 May at Chelyabinsk, an eastbound train bearing Legion forces, Czechs and Slovaks who favored the Allies and who sought independence from Austria-Hungary, encountered a westbound train bearing Hungarians, who were loyal to Austria-Hungary and the Central Powers and who regarded Legion troops as traitors.

An armed conflict ensued at close range, fueled by the rival nationalisms. The Legion defeated the Hungarian loyalists. In response, local Bolsheviks intervened, and arrested some Legion troops. The Legion then attacked the Bolsheviks, storming the railway station, freeing their men, and effectively taking over the city of Chelyabinsk while cutting the Bolshevik rail link to Siberia.

This incident was eventually settled peacefully but it was used by the Bolshevik regime to order the disarmament of the Legion as the episode had threatened Yekaterinburg, 140 miles away, and sparked wider hostilities throughout Siberia, in which the Bolsheviks steadily lost control over the railway and the region: the Legion quickly occupied more cities on the Trans-Siberian Railway, including Petropavl, Kurgan, Novonikolaevsk, Mariinsk, Nizhneudinsk, and Kansk.

Though the Legion did not specifically seek to intervene on the anti-Bolshevik side in the Russian Civil War and sought only to secure safe exit from Russia, Bolshevik defeat in Siberia enabled anti-Bolshevik or White Russian officers' organizations to seize the advantage, overthrowing Bolsheviks in Petropavl and Omsk. In June, the Legion, having informally sided against the Bolsheviks for protection and convenience, captured Samara, enabling the first anti-Bolshevik local government in Siberia, the Komuch, formed on 8 June. On 13 June, Whites formed the Provisional Siberian Government in Omsk. The Commander of the 1st Legionary Division Stanislav Čeček gave an order:

...Our detachment – a vanguard of Allied Forces, our only goal – to rebuild anti-Germany front in Russia in collaboration with Russians and our allies...

In July, White Russian troops commanded by Vladimir Kappel took Syzran, while Czechoslovak troops took Kuznetsk. Anti-Bolshevik forces advanced towards Saratov and Kazan. In Western Siberia, Jan Syrový took Tyumen, in Eastern Siberia Radola Gajda took Irkutsk and later Chita.

According to William Henry Chamberlin,

The opposing fronts which grew up during the summer of 1918 from Perm, in the Northern Urals, to Orenburg, where the steppes of Asia begin, presented a curious checkerboard appearance in August. The forces engaged were very small in proportion to the area; there were apparently about 65,000 Red troops as against approximately 50,000 Czechoslovaks and anti-Bolshevik Russians.

== Retreating ==
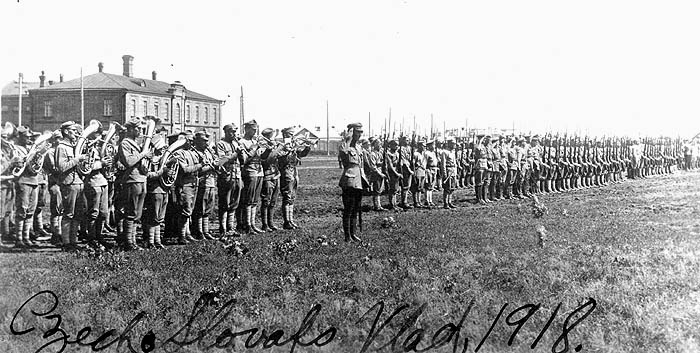
Czechoslovak troops in Vladivostok

On 3 August, Japanese, British, French, and American troops landed at Vladivostok. The Japanese sent about 70,000 into the country east of Lake Baikal. By the autumn of 1918, the legion no longer played an active part in the Russian civil war. After the Kolchak Coup against the Provisional All-Russian Government, and the installment of Alexander Kolchak's military dictatorship, Czechoslovaks were withdrawn from the front, and assigned the task of guarding the Trans-Siberian Railway.

In the autumn, the Red Army counterattacked, defeating the Whites in western Siberia. In October, Czechoslovakia was proclaimed newly independent. In November, Austria-Hungary collapsed and World War I ended, intensifying the desire of Legion members to exit Russia, particularly as the new Czechoslovakia faced opposition by, and armed conflict with, its neighbors. In early 1919, Legion troops began to retreat to the Trans-Siberian Railway. On 27 January 1919, Legion commander Jan Syrový claimed the Trans-Siberian Railway between Novonikolaevsk and Irkutsk as a Czechoslovak zone of operation, interfering with White Russian efforts in Siberia.

Early in 1920 in Irkutsk, in return for safe transit eastward for Zaamurets and other Czechoslovak trains, Syrový agreed to hand over Alexander Kolchak to the representatives of the Red Political Centre, who executed Kolchak in February. Because of this, and also because of an attempted rebellion against the Whites, organized by Radola Gajda in Vladivostok on 17 November 1919, the Whites accused the Czechoslovaks of treason.

Between December 1919 and September 1920, the Legion evacuated by sea from Vladivostok.

== See also ==
- List of states and regions involved in the Russian Civil War
- Bibliography of the Russian Revolution and Civil War
- Outline of the Russian Revolution and Civil War
- Ten Thousand – 10,000 Greek mercenaries who were trapped deep in hostile territory and fought their way out during the civil war of the Achaemenid Empire.

== Sources ==
- Trotsky, Leon. "How the Revolution Armed".
- Fic, Victor M. (1978). The Bolsheviks and the Czechoslovak Legion: The Origin of Their Armed Conflict, March–May 1918. New Delhi: Abhinav Publications. ISBN 9788170170754 – via Google Books.
- Smele, Jonathan D. (2016) [2015]. The 'Russian' Civil Wars, 1916–1926: Ten Years That Shook the World (2 ed.). New York City: Oxford University Press. ISBN 9780190613211 – via Google Books.
- Pearce, Brian (1987). "The Czechoslovak Revolt and its Consequences". How Haig Saved Lenin (1st ed.). London: Palgrave Macmillan. pp. 41–49. doi:10.1007/978-1-349-18843-7_7. ISBN 978-1-349-18845-1.
