= People's Army of Komuch =

Anti-Bolshevik army during the Russian Civil War

- Народная армия КОМУЧа
- Active: 8 June – 24 October 1918
- Allegiance: Committee of Members of the Constituent Assembly
- Type: Military
- Size: 30 000
- Colours: Red
- Engagements: Civil war in Russia; Capture of Kazan by the White Army; Kazan Operation; Simbirsk Operation; Syzran–Samara Operation

Commanders
- Notable commanders: Stanislav Čeček; Vladimir Kappel; Nikolay Galkin

The People's Army of Komuch (Russian: Народная армия КОМУЧа, romanized: Narodnaya armiya KOMUCha) was an anti-Bolshevik army during the Russian Civil War that fought in the Volga Region from June to September in 1918. It was established by the Socialist Revolutionary Party and led by Vladimir Kappel.

== Organization ==
In May 1918 the Czechoslovak Legion revolted on the Trans-Siberian Railway. On June 8, the Czech Legion captured Samara, Russia, and several members of the Constituent Assembly, which had been dissolved by the Bolsheviks, organized a Committee of Members of the Constituent Assembly. On the same day an organization of underground officers was established under the supervision of the Socialist-Revolutionary Party. On June 10 a group of officers of the general staff arrived and helped organize a military structure. They created a detachment of 350 men, which had two infantry companies, a cavalry squadron and a mounted artillery detachment. General Vladimir Kappel became a chief of this military group. Kappel was a monarchist, but stated that he would fight under any banner against the Bolsheviks.

== Nomenclature ==
In Russian "Constituent Assembly" is transliterated as "Uchreditel'noe Sobranie", hence the abbreviation for the full committee in English is "Komuch").

== Battles ==
On June, 11, Kappel's detachment stormed and captured Syzran, then Stavropol, Buguruslan and Buzuluk. On July 21, after a 150-km march, the Russian-Czechoslovak detachment under Kappel's command stormed and captured Simbirsk; for this victory Kappel was promoted to colonel. On July 22, Kappel officially became the head of all Komuch forces, which consisted of two infantry regiments and several artillery batteries (about three thousand men altogether).

When the Komuch met in Samara, it was decided that the main strategic goal was to capture Saratov, but Kappel thought that Kazan was a more important target, and thus he attacked and conquered it, which was defended by a large but poorly prepared Red Army.

Kappel thought it was necessary to capitalize on the situation and advance to Moscow through Nizhny Novgorod, but the Komuch and the commanders of the Czechoslovak troops replied that in this case there would have not been enough troops to defend Samara, Simbirsk, and Kazan. The People's Army was placed in a defensive position, and the Red Army gained time to regroup.

At the beginning of September, the Red Army began to advance. Kazan was captured by Red Army on September 5 and Simbirsk on September 12. During two weeks Kappel's group defended the left bank of the Volga River and, after joining with other troops, it retreated to Ufa.

== Merger ==
On September 23, 1918, the Komuch and the Provisional Government of Autonomous Siberia merged in Ufa to become the united Provisional All-Russian Government. On September 28, 1918, General Vasily Boldyrev was appointed supreme commander of all land and naval Armed Forces of Russia. The People's Army of Komuch and the Siberian Army were united in one structure. The unification of the Siberian and the People's armies did not lead to success: the Volga Region was completely occupied by the Bolsheviks: Syzran fell on October 3, 1918, and Samara, the former capital of the Komuch Army, on October 8.

In the fall of 1918, during the further unification of the anti-Bolshevik armed forces of the east of Russia, the People's army was abolished, and its forces transformed into the 1st Volga Corps, under command of Vladimir Kappel.

== Rank insignia ==
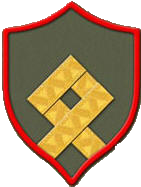
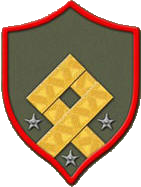
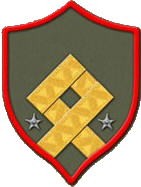
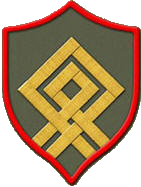
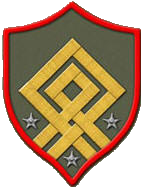
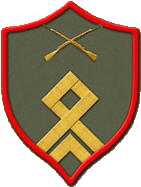
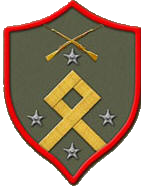
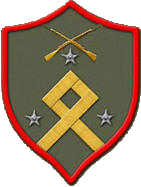
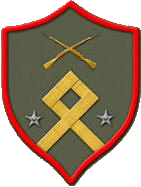
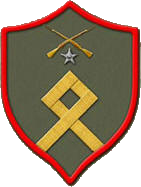
OFFICERS
General officers			Field officers
General	Lieutenant general	Major general	Colonel	Lieutenant colonel
Company officers
Captain	Staff Captain	Lieutenant	Second Lieutenant	Ensign

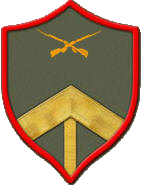
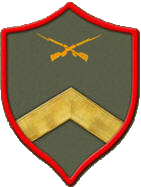
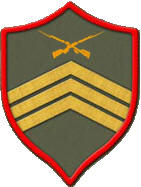
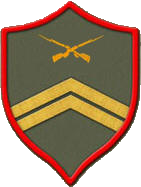
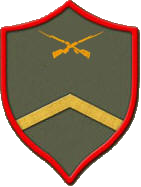
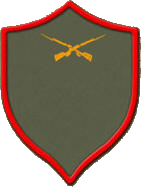
ENLISTED
NCO				Men
Podpraporshchik	Feldwebel	Senior Unteroffizier	Junior Unteroffizier	Gefreiter	Private

== Sources ==
- Н. Е. Какурин, И. И. Вацетис "Гражданская война. 1918-1921" (N. Ye. Kakurin, I. I. Vacietis "Civil War. 1918-1921"). St. Petersburg, "Polygon" Publishing House, 2002. ISBN 5-89173-150-9
