= Capture of Kazan by the White Army =

Russian Civil War

Battle for Kazan
- Part of the Eastern Front of the Russian Civil War
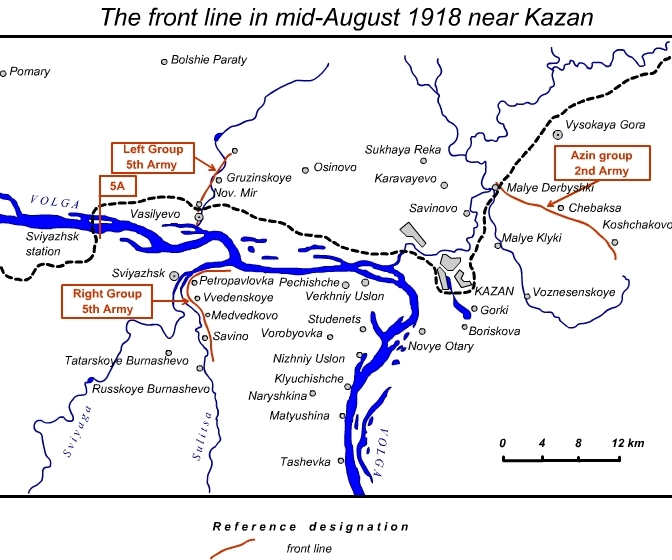
- Frontline near Kazan in August, 1918
Date	August 1 to 7, 1918
Location	Kazan
Result	White victory

Belligerents
Russian SFSR	People's Army of Komuch; Czechoslovak Legion

Commanders and leaders
Mikhail Muravyov; Jukums Vācietis; Mirsäyet Soltanğäliev; Mullanur Waxitov (executed)	Vladimir Kappel; Josef Švec

Strength
About 10,000	About 3,300

The city of Kazan was captured by the White Army in August 1918 during the Russian Civil War.

== Background ==
At July 22, People's Army of Komuch together with Czechoslovak Legion (about 3,300 men with 4 cannons in common) captured Simbirsk and on August 1, began to move north in the direction of Kazan. After crushing the detachment of Reds (about 2,500 men with 10 cannons) began quick advance. Going along the Volga River, on August 4 they reached the mouth of the Kama River. Reds tried to stop Whites again, but lost and retreated to Kazan. During that battle it became obvious that Red troops were ill-prepared and badly organized.

At that time Kazan had 146,000 inhabitants. For the defence of Kazan Reds concentrated about 10,000 men from all the region. The most effective of the defending troops were "international" detachments: Latvian Riflemen (two regiments), Karl Marx's International Battalion (made from Austrians and Hungarians prisoners, captured by Russians during World War I), the 1st Moslem Communist Battalion, 1st Tatar-Bashkir Battalion, etc.

== The battle ==
The Whites reached Kazan on the evening of 5 August. River ships then went up-stream on the Volga, and the detachment of Vladimir Kappel landed on the right bank, thereby blocking the river. At the same time two Czechoslovak Battalions landed 5 km down-stream of Kazan and began to advance, but this was stopped by the Latvian Riflemen. Latvians were close to winning, but suddenly a Serbian battalion of Reds, defending the Kazan Kremlin, changed sides and attacked the Latvians from the flank. The Reds retreated to the city through a rainstorm, while the Whites stayed on the battlefield.

In the morning of August, 6, Kappel crossed the river and attacked Kazan from the north. The Reds moved their best troops (international brigades) to the north of the city, and the Czechoslovaks used this moment to attack the ill-prepared Red Guards from another direction. Using this opportunity, an underground officer organization began a rebellion within the city. By evening the city was encircled by Whites from three sides, and there was fighting inside the city. During the night part of red troops began to breakthrough to the east, in Sviyazhsk direction, with another group escaping to the north, to the Arsk. However, most of the red troops were captured by Whites.

== Aftermath ==
After the capture of Kazan the entire General Staff Academy changed sides and joined the White Movement. Reds' retreat from Kazan made possible the Izhevsk-Votkinsk Uprising. But one of the most sensational results was the capture of the Gold Reserves of the Russian Empire, moved to Kazan during the First World War for safety. After capturing Kazan Kappel sent a telegram to Stanislav Čeček (commander of 1st Legionnaire Division):

After two-days fighting, at August, 7, Kazan is captured by the joint forces of Samara Detachment of People Army and Czechoslovaks, together with River Fleet. Trophies are uncountable, we captured the Gold Reserves of Russia - 650 million. Losses of my detachment - 25 men, troops fought fine.

According to William Henry Chamberlin, "Later this gold came into the possession of the Siberian dictator, Kolchak; part of it was spent in buying munitions and other supplies abroad; part of it leaked out of the country in various ways when Kolchak fell; some of the gold was recovered by the Red troops."

== See also ==
- Bibliography of the Russian Revolution and Civil War
- Outline of the Russian Revolution and Civil War
- Index of articles related to the Russian Revolution and Civil War
- The "Russian" Civil Wars, 1916–1926: Ten Years That Shook the World
- Russia in Flames: War, Revolution, Civil War, 1914–1921
- Russia in Revolution: An Empire in Crisis, 1890 to 1928
- Russia: Revolution and Civil War, 1917—1921
- The Russian Revolution: A New History

== Sources ==
- Н.Е.Какурин, И.И.Вацетис "Гражданская война. 1918-1921" (N.E.Kakurin, I.I.Vacietis "Civil War. 1918-1921") - Sankt-Peterburg, "Polygon" Publishing House, 2002. ISBN 5-89173-150-9
