= Nikolai Markin =

Bolshevik revolutionary

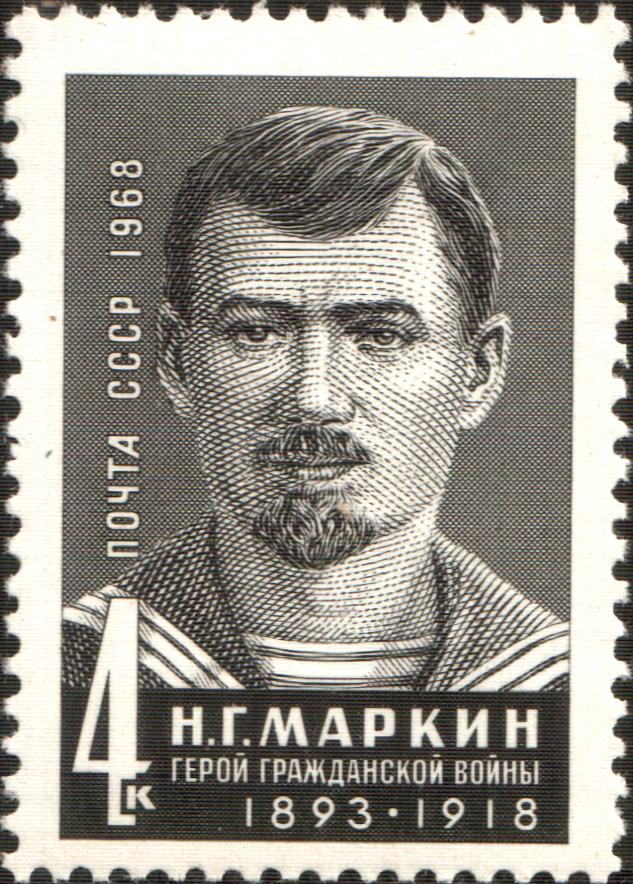
Nikolai Markin

Nikolai Markin (Russian: Николай Григорьевич Маркин, born 21 May 1893 in Gorodishchensky District – 1 October 1918 in the village of Pyany Bor on the River Kama) was a Bolshevik revolutionary and sailor. His parents had been textile workers in a factory in the Penza Province, but they subsequently moved to Vladikavkaz. He was a member of the central Executive Committee of the First Congress of Soviets in 1917.
