= Committee of Members of the Constituent Assembly =

Russian anti-Bolshevik government formed in 1918

Committee of Members of the Constituent Assembly Комитет членов Учредительного собрания (Russian) Komitet chlenov Uchreditelnogo sobraniya
- 1918
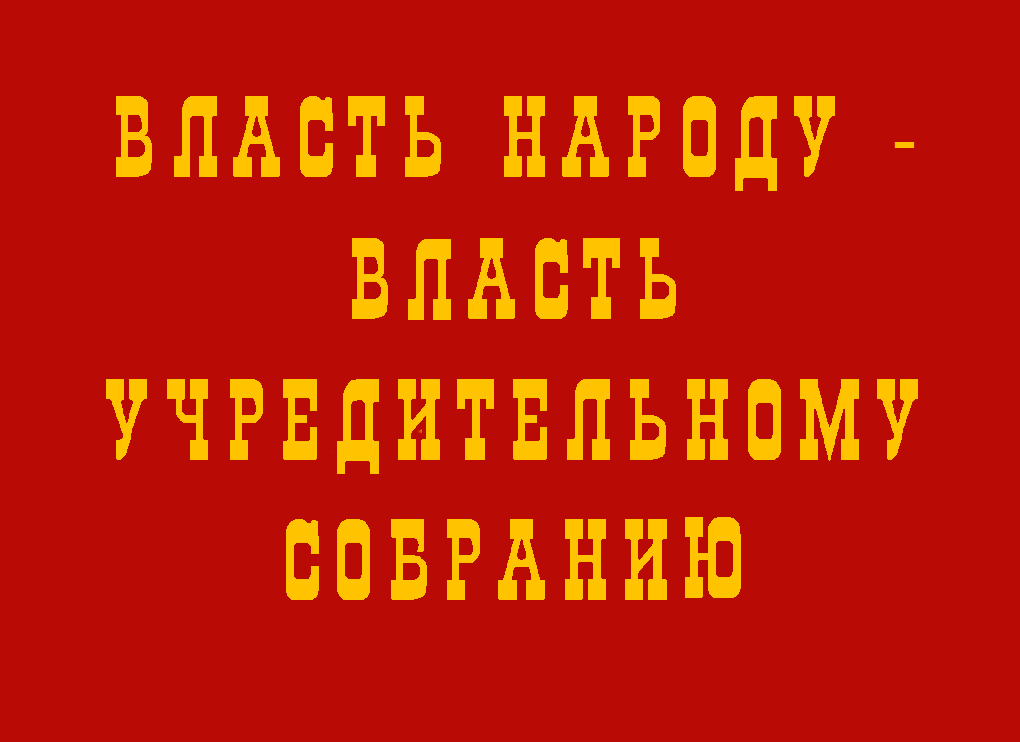
- Flag "POWER TO THE PEOPLE - POWER TO THE CONSTITUENT ASSEMBLY" Seal

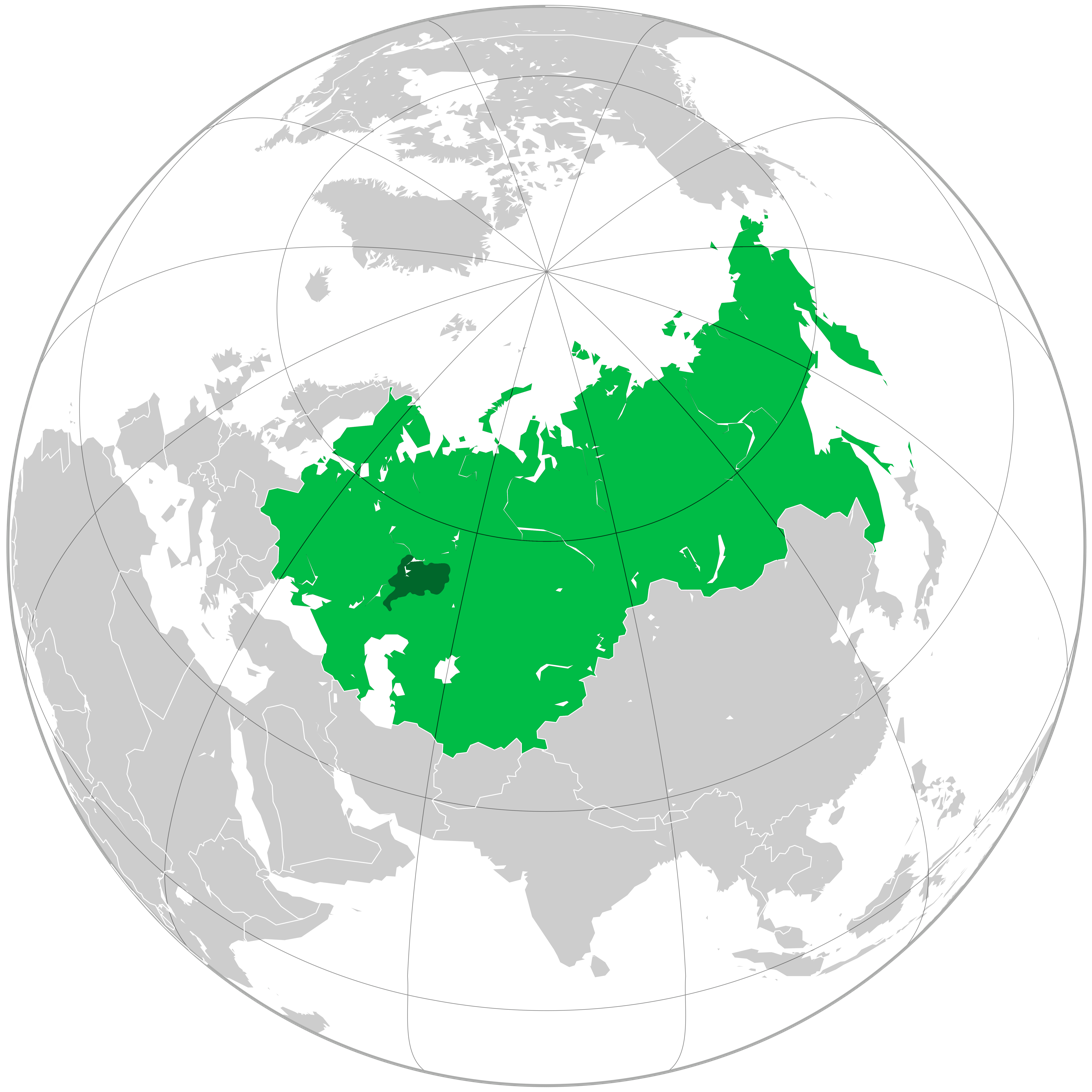
- Controlled territory Claimed territories (Russian Republic)
- Capital: Samara
- Common languages: Russian
- Government: Republic
- Chairman
  - 1918: Vladimir Vol'skii
- Historical era: Russian Civil War
  - Established: June 8, 1918
  - Disestablished: September 23, 1918
Preceded by	Succeeded by
Russian Soviet Republic; Russian Republic	Russian State

The Committee of Members of the Constituent Assembly (Russian: Комитет членов Учредительного собрания) was an anti-Bolshevik government that operated in Samara, Russia, during the Russian Civil War of 1917–1922. It formed on June 8, 1918, after the Czechoslovak Legion had occupied the city.

== Nomenclature ==
In Russian, the committee was called Комитет членов Учредительного собрания, transliterated as Komitet chlenov uchreditelnogo sobraniya. The initial consonants of the first and third words gave Комуч, transliterated as Komuch, as the shorthand name for the committee.

== History ==
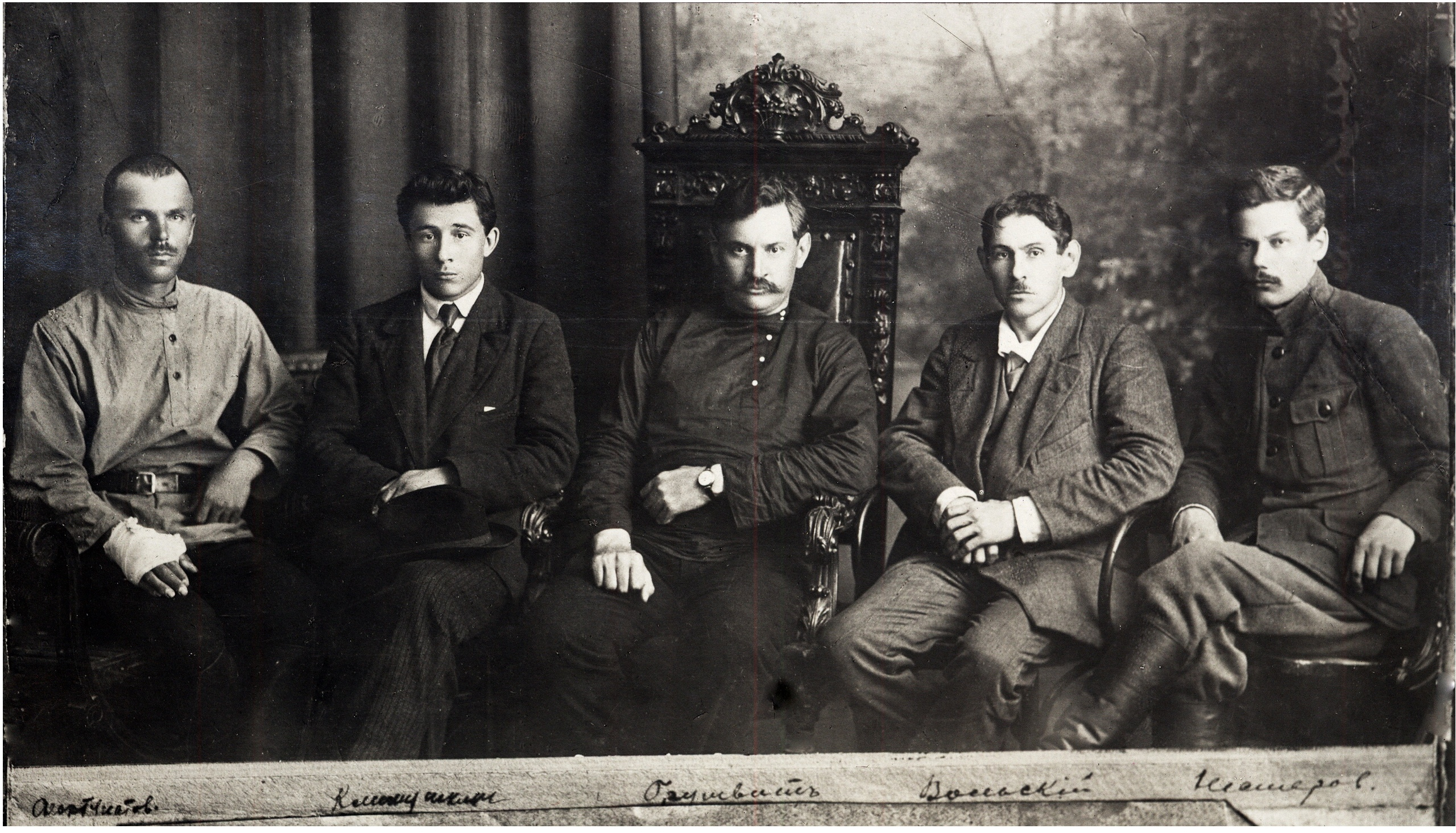
Initial members of the committee. From left to right: Boris Fortunatov, Prokopiy Klimushkin, Ivan Brushvit, Vladimir Volsky (chairman) and Ivan Nesterov.

Komuch proclaimed itself the highest authority in Russia, temporarily acting on behalf of the Russian Constituent Assembly in the territory occupied by the interventionists and the White Movement until the convocation of a new Assembly. Initially, Komuch consisted of five Socialist-Revolutionaries – Vladimir Vol'skii (chairman), Ivan Brushvit, Prokopiy Klimushkin, Boris Fortunatov and Ivan Nesterov – former members of the Constituent Assembly that had been dissolved by the Bolsheviks. Two other members, N. Shmelev and V. Abramov, are named in a declaration issued by Komuch that reinstated freedoms and set forth fundamental principles. Its executive body was the "Council of Department Heads" led by Yevgeny Rogovsky.

The Committee grew in size as members, mainly Socialist-Revolutionaries, of the former Constituent Assembly travelled to Samara. By the end of September 1918, it numbered 96 members.

On 8 June 1918, after the Revolt of the Czechoslovak Legion, Brushvit convinced the legion to occupy Samara. According to William Henry Chamberlin, "A committee of five members of the dissolved Constituent Assembly, all Socialist Revolutionaries, Brushvit, Fortunatov, Klimushkin, Volsky and Nesterov, thereupon assumed civil and military power in Samara City and Province."

Having seized power with the help of the Czech Legion, Komuch announced the "reinstatement" of various democratic freedoms. An eight-hour working day was established and plant and factory committees (fabzavkomy, from "fabrichno-zavodskiye komitety") and trade unions were permitted, as were conferences and congresses of workers and peasants. Soviet decrees were abrogated and all industry and financial establishments returned to their former owners, along with the freedom to pursue private enterprise. City dumas, zemstva and other municipal institutions were also reinstated.

Paying lip service to the socialization of land, Komuch provided landowners with an opportunity to recover their confiscated lands from peasants and harvest the winter crops of 1917. Expeditions were sent to the rural areas of Russia to protect landowners, kulaks and their property and, later, to mobilize the People's Army of Komuch (the "People's Army").

From June to August 1918, Komuch's influence spread from Samara into the provinces of Simbirsk, Kazan, Ufa and Saratov. In September, however, the People's Army suffered a number of defeats by the Soviet Red Army and withdrew from much of the territory.

Komuch participated with the Provisional Siberian Government in the State Conference held in Ufa held between 8 and 23 September 1918. Some of the 170 delegates present also represented other smaller regions. While the conference was in progress, Komuch suffered two significant defeats, losing control of Kazan on 10 September and of Simbirsk two days later. The conference, meanwhile, established the short-lived Provisional All-Russian Government.

After Admiral Aleksandr Kolchak's coup, the provisional government and other institutions were dissolved by General Vladimir Kappel in November 1918.
