= Vladimir Kappel =

White Russian general (1883–1920)

- Владимир Каппель
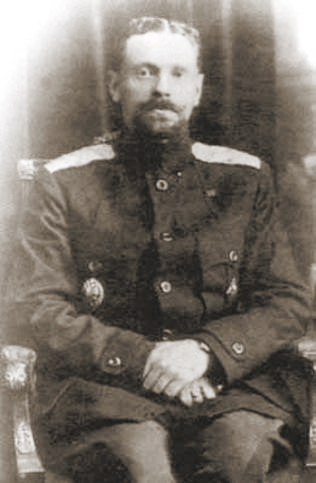
- Kappel in 1919
- Born: April 28, 1883; Tsarskoye Selo, Saint Petersburg Governorate, Russian Empire
- Died: January 26, 1920 (aged 36); Nizhneozyornaya village
- Military career
- Allegiance: Russia; White Army
- Service years: 1903–1920
- Rank: General
- Unit: 54th Novomirgorod Dragoon Regiment
- Commands: People Army of Komuch, 1st Volga Corps, 2nd Ufa Corps, 3rd Army
- Conflicts: World War I; Brusilov offensive; Russian Civil War; Capture of Kazan; Kazan Operation; Great Siberian Ice March †
- Awards: Order of St. George 3rd class, Order of St. George 4th class, Order of St. Vladimir 4th class, Order of St. Anne 2nd class, Order of St. Anne 3rd class, Order of St. Anne 4th class, Order of St. Stanislaus 2nd class, Order of St. Stanislaus 3rd class

Vladimir Oskarovich Kappel (Russian: Владимир Оскарович Каппель; 28 April [O.S. 16 April] 1883 – January 26, 1920) was a Russian military leader and one of the leaders of the White movement.

== Early life ==
Kappel was born into a Swedish-Russian family. He graduated from the Saint Petersburg Page Corps and then from the Nicholas Cavalry College and Nicholas Academy of General Staff.

== First World War ==
During the First World War, Kappel was Chief of the 347th Infantry Regiment's Staff and an officer in the 1st Army's Staff. He began as the Staff of the Army Corps. In February 1915, he was transferred to the front at the headquarters of the 5th Don Cossack Division. He stayed at that post until his promotion to the rank of staff captain.

He participated in the planning of the Brusilov offensive of 1916, the most successful Russian offensive of the war.

On 15 August 1916, Kappel was made lieutenant-colonel and posted Deputy Head of the Headquarters Operations Office for the SouthWestern Front.

== Russian Civil War ==
Although he was a self-declared monarchist, Kappel said that he would fight under any banner against the Bolsheviks. Kappel's adherents and allies were known in Russian as kappelevtsy (каппелевцы).

Following the Bolshevik Revolution, Kappel commanded the Komuch White Army group (People's Army of Komuch) (June–September 1918) and from December 1919 the eastern front of Aleksandr Kolchak's forces. He participated in the Spring 1919 offensive towards Moscow.

Despite his rank, the young officer was often seen with grenades and revolvers on his belt, which earned him the reputation of a soldier-general and made him one of the most popular White generals among the rank and file. He insisted on arming all of his staff and often carried his rifle to planning sessions. His relatively young age was also a contributing factor to his reputation as an effective general.

Despite the military prowess of Kappel and his troops, the spring offensive failed since their supply lines were over-extended, their troops were meager, ammunition shortages were common, and the Red Army was being reorganized and strengthened. As multiple revolts caused the White Army's rear to disintegrate, Kolchak was captured by Soviet allies. Kappel and his Kappelevtsy thus began a forced march through the Siberian winter, the Great Siberian Ice March, similar to what the Volunteer Army had done in 1918, the Kuban Ice March.

During the march, on 15 January 1920, Kappel learnt of Kolchak's capture. Shortly afterwards, he fell through the ice while he was crossing the Kan River, worsening his already fragile health. Because of frostbite, the fingers of his right hand had to be removed along with his left foot, without anesthetics. After the amputation, however, his health did not improve. Still advancing towards Irkutsk to rescue Kolchak, the General's troops captured Nizhneudinsk on the 20th. Both of Kappel's legs were frozen, and he was dying of typhus.

In the words of his colleague and friend A. A. Fedorovich: "He clenches his teeth to not scream out in pain. The general has been hoisted and attached to his horse with what is left of his hands and body. Vladimir greets those who have not laid down their weapons. And he only stops at night."

On the 21st, Kappel handed over command of his troops to General Sergei Wojciechowski because of his failing health. He also sent his wife his wedding ring and one of his Crosses of St. George. On the 22nd, on the verge of death, Kappel ordered his troops to accelerate their march towards Irkutsk, to save their gold reserves and Admiral Kolchak from execution. On the 26th, Kappel died of his ailments near Tulun, about 350 kilometres (220 mi) from Irkutsk. His last words to his men were "Tell my men that I adored them, and that my death in the midst of them proves it."

His command was officially handed over to General Wojciechowski, who continued the advance towards Irkutsk. Kappel's men, bringing his coffin with them to avoid desecration like with that other White Generals' burial sites, reached the outskirts of the city on 30 January. Kolchak, however, had been executed on the 6 or 7 February, shortly before they were to reach him. They then continued their retreat towards Chita, ending their Great Siberian Ice March there.

== Legacy ==
Kappel's tomb in Harbin, China, was pulled down in 1955 after Mao Zedong assumed power in China. On 19 December 2006, the remains of Kappel were identified and transported for reinterment from China to Irkutsk. On January 13, 2007, Kappel's remains were interred at Donskoy Monastery, in Moscow.

== Honours and awards ==
- Order of Saint Stanislaus, 3rd class (11 April 1910), with swords and bow (10 February 1916), 2nd class with swords (7 June 1915)
- Order of St. Anna, 3rd class (8 May 1913 - for the successful completion of the Nicholas General Staff Academy), with swords and bow (25 April 1915), 2nd class with swords (7 June 1915), 4th class with the inscription "For Bravery" (27 January 1916)
- Order of St. Vladimir, 4th class with swords and bow (1 March 1915)
- Order of St. George, 4th class (22 June 1919), 3rd class (11 September 1919)
- Gratitude of the Supreme Ruler and Supreme Commander (14 February 1919)
