= Jukums Vācietis =

Soviet military leader (1873–1938)

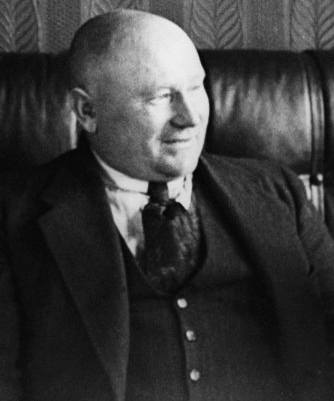
- Vācietis in 1920
- Born: 23 November 1873 near Saldus, Courland Governorate, Russian Empire (now Saldus municipality, Latvia)
- Died: 28 July 1938 (aged 64); Moscow, Russian SFSR, Soviet Union
- Burial place: Riga
- Other names: Иоаким Вацетис (in Russian); Ioakim Vatsetis
- Military career
- Allegiance: Russian Empire (1891–1917); Russian SFSR (1917–1922); Soviet Union (1922–1938)
- Branch: Imperial Russian Army; Red Army
- Service years: 1891–1938
- Rank: Polkovnik (Russia); Komandarm 2nd rank (Soviet)
- Conflicts: First World War; Russian Civil War; Uprising of the Polish Corps; Battle of Rogachev; Left SR uprising; Eastern Front; Kazan Operation; Westward Offensive; Estonian War of Independence; Latvian War of Independence; Soviet Offensive in Latvia (1918–1919)

Jukums Vācietis (Russian: Иоаки́м Иоаки́мович Ва́цетис, romanized: Ioakim Ioakimovich Vatsetis; 23 November [O.S. 11 November] 1873 – 28 July 1938) was a Latvian and Soviet military commander. He was a rare example of a notable Soviet leader who was not a member of the Communist Party (or of any other political party), until his demise during the Great Purge in the 1930s.

== Early life ==
Jukums Vācietis's family were Latvian labourers. From about the age of six, he worked as a shepherd and as a labourer, while he was a pupil at the Šķēde Parish School. From 1889–1891 he studied at the Ministry of Kuldīga school. At the same time, he worked in a match factory.

== Military career ==
Vācietis started his military career in Imperial Russia in 1891, and reached the rank of second lieutenant after graduating from infantry cadet school in 1895. In 1914, at the start of World War I, he saw combat as a battalion commander in Poland and East Prussia, and was wounded several times. After hospital treatment, he was promoted to the rank of colonel. From October 1916, he commanded the 5th Latvian Zemgale Rifle Regiment and distinguished himself during the defence of Riga against the advancing German army in August 1916.

Vācietis was not involved in any political activity before 1917, but after the October Revolution, he immediately sided with the new Bolshevik government, and was given command of the 12th army. From April 1918, Vācietis was the commander of the Red Latvian Riflemen division, which was then the most reliable unit under Bolshevik control. He played a critical role in July 1918 in suppressing a revolt by the Left Socialist-Revolutionaries, who opposed the decision to end the war with Germany. From July to September 1918, Vācietis commanded the Eastern Front, which he created out of scattered units fighting for the Bolsheviks in Siberia against the White Army and the Czechoslovak Legion. During his two months as commander of the front, the Red Army scored its first major victory of the Russian Civil War by recapturing Kazan.

On 2 September 1918 Vācietis was appointed the first commander-in-chief of the Red Army (RKKA), and a member of the Revolutionary Military Council - but became embroiled in a dispute with Sergey Kamenev, his successor as commander of the Eastern Front, which was intertwined with power struggles within the Bolshevik party leadership, in which Leon Trotsky, the Commissar for Military and Naval Affairs, backed Vācietis, and Joseph Stalin backed Kamenev. Trotsky later wrote that

It is hard to say which one of the two colonels was the more gifted. Both undoubtedly were endowed with first-rate talents ... Vācietis was the more stubborn and cranky and undoubtedly prone to yield to the influence of elements hostile to the revolution. Kamenev was easier to get along with."

In summer 1919 Vācietis proposed that the Eastern Front should halt military operations having reached the Urals, so that troops could be transferred to the south for the campaign against General Denikin, and the Don Cossacks, but Kamenev insisted that they could spare troops for the southern front and still advance past the Urals into Siberia. He was proved right, and on 3 July 1919, Kamenev replaced Vācietis as commander-in-chief of the Red Army. On 8 July 1919, Vācietis was arrested under the accusation of membership in a counter-revolutionary reactionary White Guardist organization, but was soon released when the charge was proved false. Trotsky suspected that "dissatisfied with his removal from the post of Commander-in-Chief, he had engaged in reckless talk with officers close to him." He also believed that Stalin was behind Vācietis's arrest.

In 1922 Vācietis became a professor of the RKKA Military Academy (future Frunze Military Academy). During this time, he wrote several books, most notable among them being 'Latvian Riflemen's Historical Importance'. In 1935 Vācietis was assigned a personal rank of Komandarm 2nd rank.

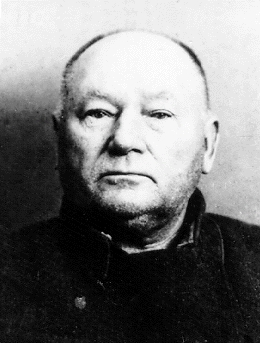
Photo of Vācietis after his arrest by the NKVD in 1937

On 29 November 1937, during the height of Stalin's Great Purge, Vācietis was arrested by the NKVD as a member of the alleged "Latvian Fascist Organization within the RKKA". On 28 July 1938, he was sentenced to death for "espionage and belonging to a counterrevolutionary terrorist organization" and shot the same day. Vācietis was rehabilitated (posthumously exonerated) in 1957.

== Family ==
He was married to Margarita Adolfina Ottilia Kerger (1882–no earlier than 1970). They had three children: daughters Irina-Ottilia Eliza (May 27, 1905–?) and Vera (1911–?), and a son, Joachim (July 19, 1909–late 1930s). His wife and children were Lutheran. In 1939, she and her daughters repatriated to Germany, while their son remained in Latvia; that branch of the family continues to this day. After the Second World War, she and her daughters moved to the United States, where she died.

== Literature ==
- Ģērmanis, Uldis (1974). Oberst Vacietis und die lettischen Schützen im Weltkrieg und in der Oktoberrevolution. Acta Universitatis Stockholmiensis; Stockholm studies in history (in German). Vol. 20. Stockholm: Almqvist & Wiksell. OCLC 1171718.
- Jēkabsons, Ēriks (2005-04-01). "Krieviski. Ar jūtamu akcentu (Nezināmais Vācietis)" (PDF). Mājas Viesis (in Latvian). Latvijas Avīze. pp. 10–11. Archived from the original (PDF) on 2005-12-14.
- Ģērmanis, Uldis (1969–1972). "Zemgaliešu komandieris". Jaunā Gaita (in Latvian). 76–90.
