= October 1918 =

Month in 1918

<<	October 1918					>>
Su	Mo	Tu	We	Th	Fr	Sa
		1	2	3	4	5
6	7	8	9	10	11	12
13	14	15	16	17	18	19
20	21	22	23	24	25	26
27	28	29	30	31

The following events occurred in October 1918:

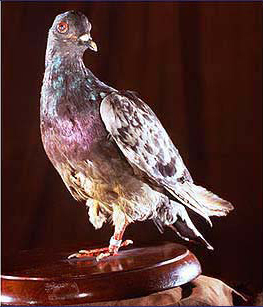
Cher Ami, homing pigeon for the United States Army, awarded the Croix de guerre for getting a message from the American "Lost Battalion" through to relief forces during the Meuse–Argonne offensive.

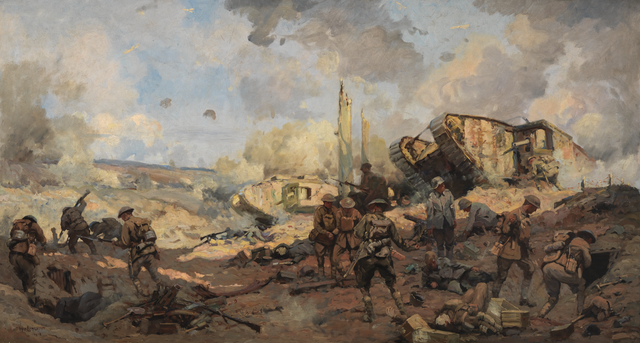
Breaking the Hindenburg Line by Will Longstaff, depicting British forces breaking through the German Hindenburg Line on the Western Front.

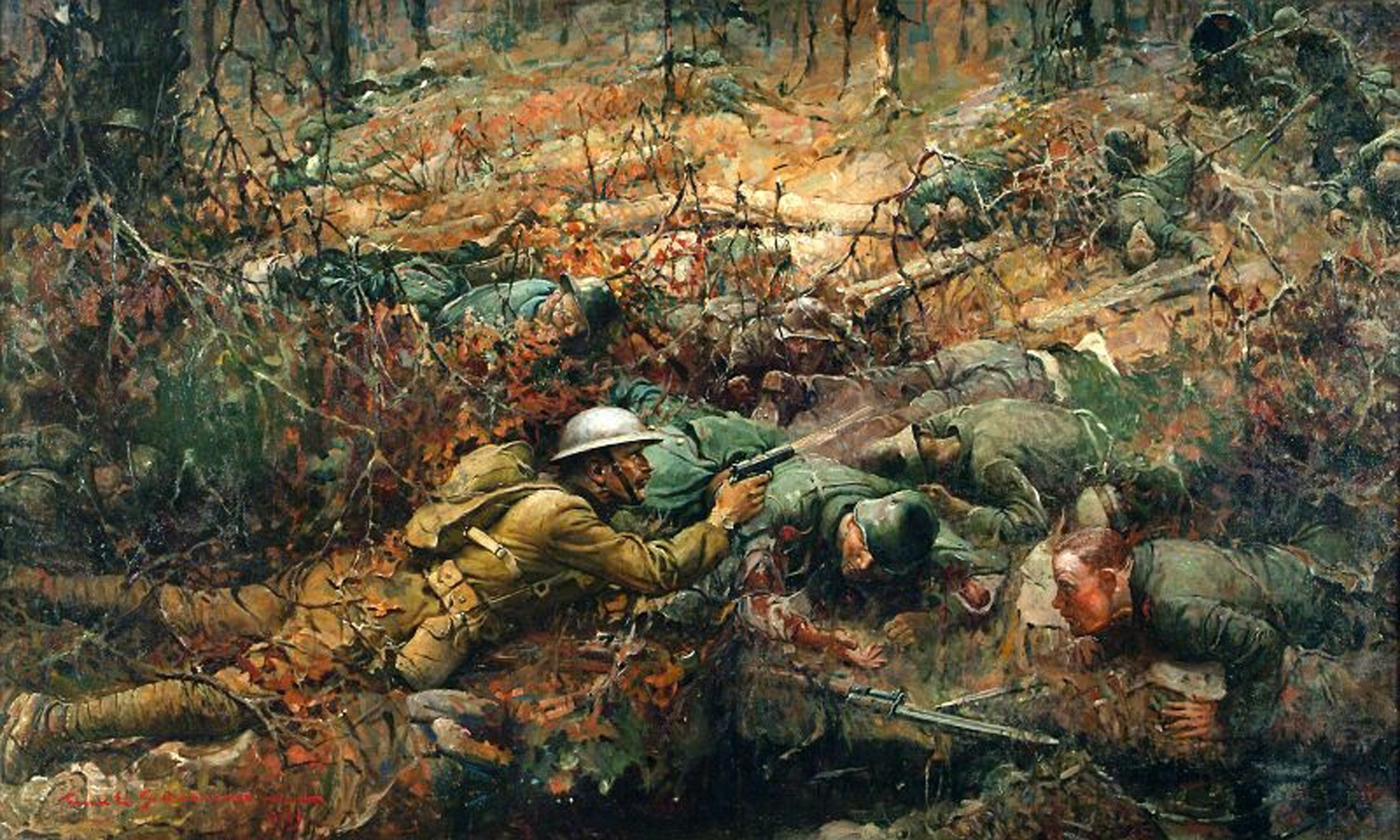
Sergeant Alvin C. York by Frank Schoonover, fighting during the Meuse–Argonne offensive

== October 1, 1918 (Tuesday) ==
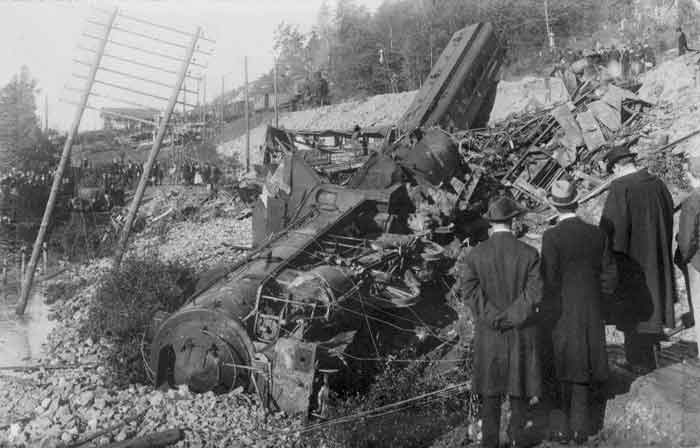
Officials survey wreckage after a train was struck by a landslide near Getå, Sweden, the worst train disaster in the country's history.

- The Desert Mounted Corps captured Damascus, ending the Battle of Megiddo. The battle was a complete loss for the Ottoman Empire, with only 6,000 out of the 35,000 troops deployed escaping. In comparison, total British casualties were 782 killed, 4,179 wounded and 382 missing out of 57,000 men in the corps.
- Battle of the Canal du Nord – The British First and Third Armies, including the Canadian Corps, captured the entire Canal du Nord in north France along with 36,500 German prisoners and 380 guns. The Allies lost 30,000 casualties but were now in attacking distance of the German-held French city of Cambrai. In all, 12 Victoria Crosses were awarded for bravery and action during the battle.
- Fifth Battle of Ypres – Allied forces captured the left bank of the Lys River.
- Liberation of Serbia, Albania and Montenegro – Allied forces conquered Berat, Albania.
- The Red Army captured the city of Syzran, Russia and forced the People's Army of Komuch to retreat to Samara.
- A landslide caused a train to derail in Getå, Östergötland, Sweden, killing 41 passengers and injuring another 41 people in what was the worst railroad accident in Swedish history.
- The Royal Air Force established air squadron No. 152.
- The Communist Party of Lithuania was established.
- Born: James R. Browning, American judge, justice of the United States Court of Appeals for the Ninth Circuit from 1961 to 1988; in Great Falls, Montana (d. 2012)

== October 2, 1918 (Wednesday) ==
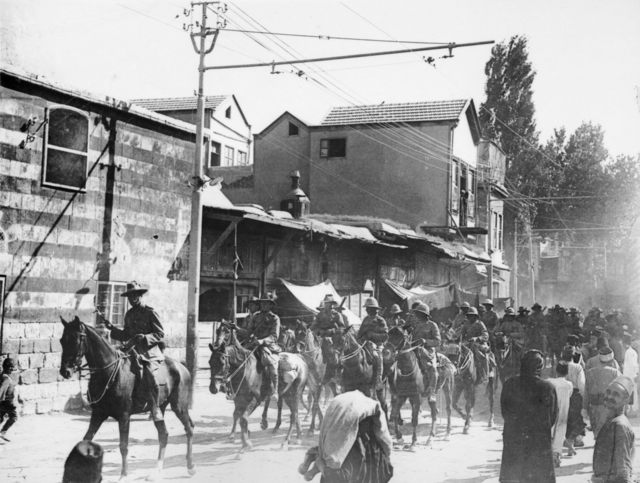
Lieutenant General Harry Chauvel commanding Desert Mounted Corps leads his corps through Damascus.

- Fifth Battle of Ypres – German reinforcements forced the Allies to halt their advance further into Belgium. The British lost 4,695 casualties, and the Belgians had 2,000 killed and 10,000 wounded, but had advanced a total 18 mi (29 km) and captured c. 10,000 prisoners, 300 guns and 600 machine-guns.
- Battle of St Quentin Canal – British and Australian forces launched attacks to break the Hindenburg Line at Beaurevoir, France, and succeeded in creating a 17 km breach.
- Meuse–Argonne offensive – American forces forced a gap in the German line in Argonne Forest in France and advanced 2.5 km (1.6 mi) into enemy territory.
- Lost Battalion – Nine companies of the US 77th Infantry Division, composed of 554 men under command of Major Charles W. Whittlesey, were cut off from the main attacking force in Argonne Forest.
- Battle of Durazzo – The Italian Navy, supported by British and American vessels, attacked the port of Durazzo, Albania held by Austria-Hungary. The attack damaged several Austro-Hungarian navy ships and destroyed three key coastal defences, along with the Royal Palace of Durrës.
- The 3rd Light Horse Brigade of the Australian Mounted Division charged Ottoman forces 17 miles (27 km) north of Damascus and captured 2,000 Ottoman troops.
- Pursuit to Haritan – The Yildirim Army Group abandoned Rayak, Lebanon to join defense forces in Aleppo.
- The experimental Kettering Bug aircraft, designed by the U.S. Army Signals Corps to carry unmanned aerial torpedoes, failed on its first test flight and crashed. Later test flights proved successful.
- The Selwyn Theatre, designed by architect George Keister and built by the Selwyn brothers Edgar and Archie, opened on 42nd Street of Manhattan in New York City.
- Born: Charles J. Loring Jr., American air force pilot, commander of the 36th Fighter-Bomber Squadron during the Korean War, recipient of the Medal of Honor, Distinguished Flying Cross, and 12 Air Medals; in Portland, Maine (d. 1952, killed in action)
- Died:
  - John Barnett, 38, Australian rugby player, second-row for the Newtown Jets from 1910 to 1915, gold medalist at the 1908 Summer Olympics, member of the Australia national rugby league team from 1907 to 1910 (b. 1880)
  - Granville Stuart, 84, American pioneer, prominent settler of the Montana Territory, earning the nickname "Mr. Montana" (b. 1834)

== October 3, 1918 (Thursday) ==
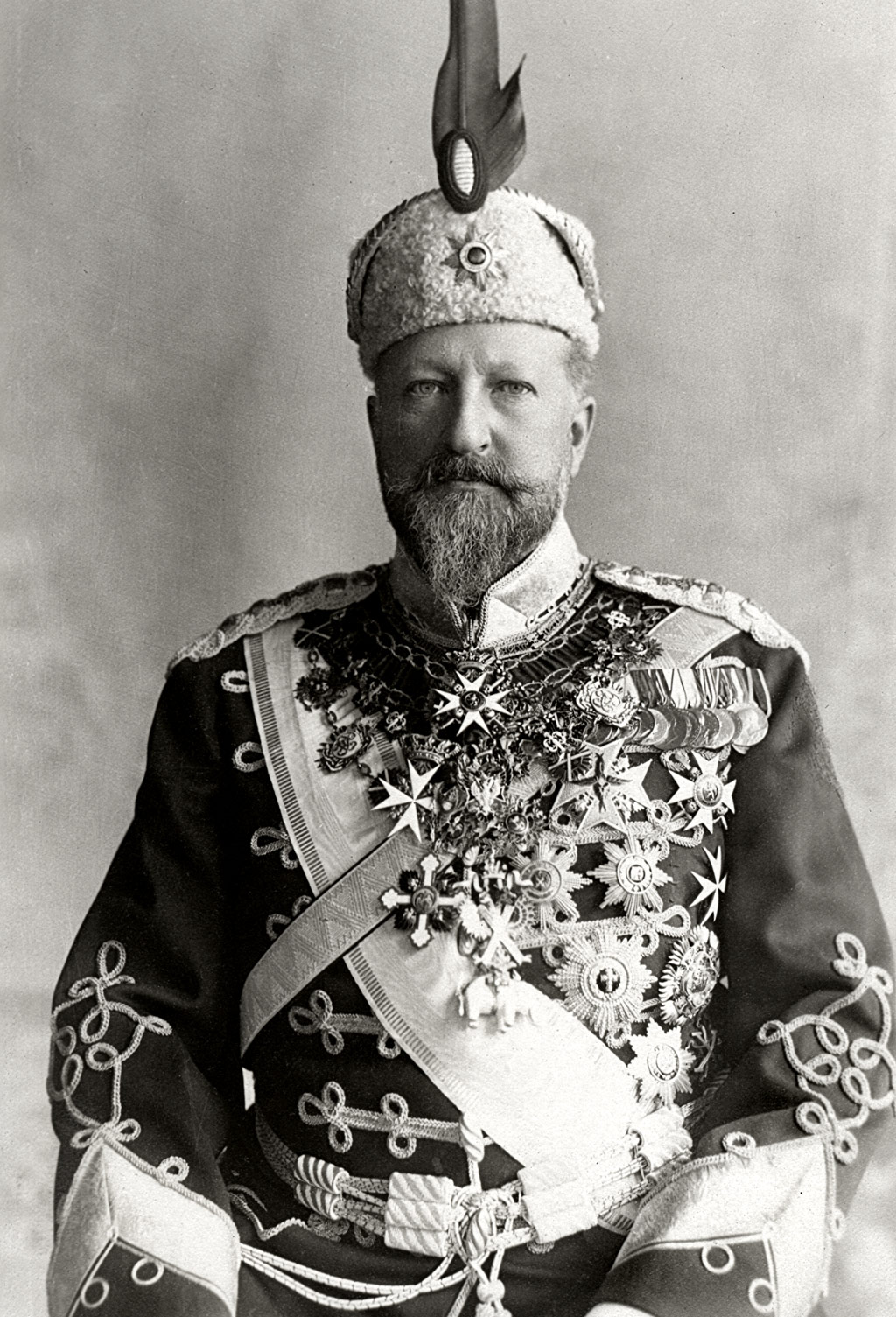
King Ferdinand abdicates his throne in Bulgaria.

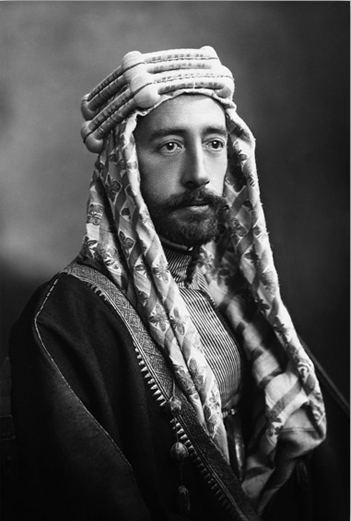
Prince Faisal

- Kaiser Wilhelm appointed Prince Maximilian of Baden Chancellor of Germany.
- King Ferdinand abdicated in the wake of the Bulgarian military collapse, with his son, Boris succeeding him.
- Prince Faisal, leader of the Arab rebellion, led his forces into Damascus.
- Lost Battalion – German forces attacked the "lost" portion of the American 77th Infantry Division dug into a hill in Argonne Forest that they had taken the previous day. The communications line had been cut making it impossible to call for reinforcements or emergency supplies, and an attempt to break out left heavy casualties. Despite heavy fire, the Americans held onto the hill.
- Pursuit to Haritan – The Desert Mounted Corps left Haifa, Palestine to pursue the remaining Yildirim Army Group into Syria.
- British ocean liner Burutu collided with another vessel and sank, killing at least 170 people.
- German destroyers SMS S33 and SMS S34 were both lost at the same time in the North Sea, when S34 struck a mine and sank and S33 was torpedoed by Royal Navy submarine HMS L10 while rescuing survivors from the other ship. At least 70 sailors were lost.
- Royal Navy submarine HMS L10 was sunk in the Heligoland Bight by two German destroyers with the loss of all 38 crew.
- Belgian pilot Willy Coppens survived an attempt on his life when German troops loaded the basket of an observation balloon, his favorite target, with explosives and used artillery fire on Allied units to lure him into the trap. The Germans detonated the explosives when Coppens arrived in his Hanriot plane to attack the balloon, but he flew through the explosion and emerged uninjured.
- The Soviet Red Army established the 11th Army.
- British writer Siegfried Sassoon visited his mentor journalist Robbie Ross for the last time. Sassoon later wrote that Ross, in saying goodbye, gave him a "presentiment of final farewell".

== October 4, 1918 (Friday) ==
- Now Chancellor of Germany, Prince Maximilian of Baden formed a new and more liberal government and sued for peace.
- Lost Battalion – With no way to escape and German soldiers shooting the army unit's messengers, the lost units of the US 77th Infantry Division resorted to using carrier pigeons to get word back to headquarters. One carrier pigeon nicknamed Cher Ami managed to get to base despite being severely wounded from a shell burst. It carried the message to call off a "friendly fire" barrage that also gave the unit's position: "We are along the road parallel to 276.4. Our own artillery is dropping a barrage directly on us. For heavens sake stop it."
- Explosions at a shell-manufacturing plant in Sayreville, New Jersey killed more than 100 people and destroyed enough ammunition to supply the Western Front for six months.
- Japanese ocean liner Hirano Maru was torpedoed and sunk in the Atlantic Ocean 200 nautical miles (370 km) south of Ireland by German submarine SM UB-91 with the loss of 292 of the 320 people on board.
- German submarine SM UB-68 was shelled and sunk in the Mediterranean Sea with the loss of one of her 34 crew.
- Born:
  - Kenichi Fukui, Japanese chemist, recipient of the Nobel Prize in Chemistry for research supporting the frontier molecular orbital theory in chemical reactions; in Nara, Japan (d. 1998)
  - Adrian Kantrowitz, American surgeon, member of the surgical team to perform the first pediatric heart transplant, inventor of the intra-aortic balloon pump; New York City (d. 2008)
- Died: Nikolai Skrydlov, Russian naval officer, recipient of the Order of St. George for action during the Russo-Turkish War; executed (b. 1844)

== October 5, 1918 (Saturday) ==
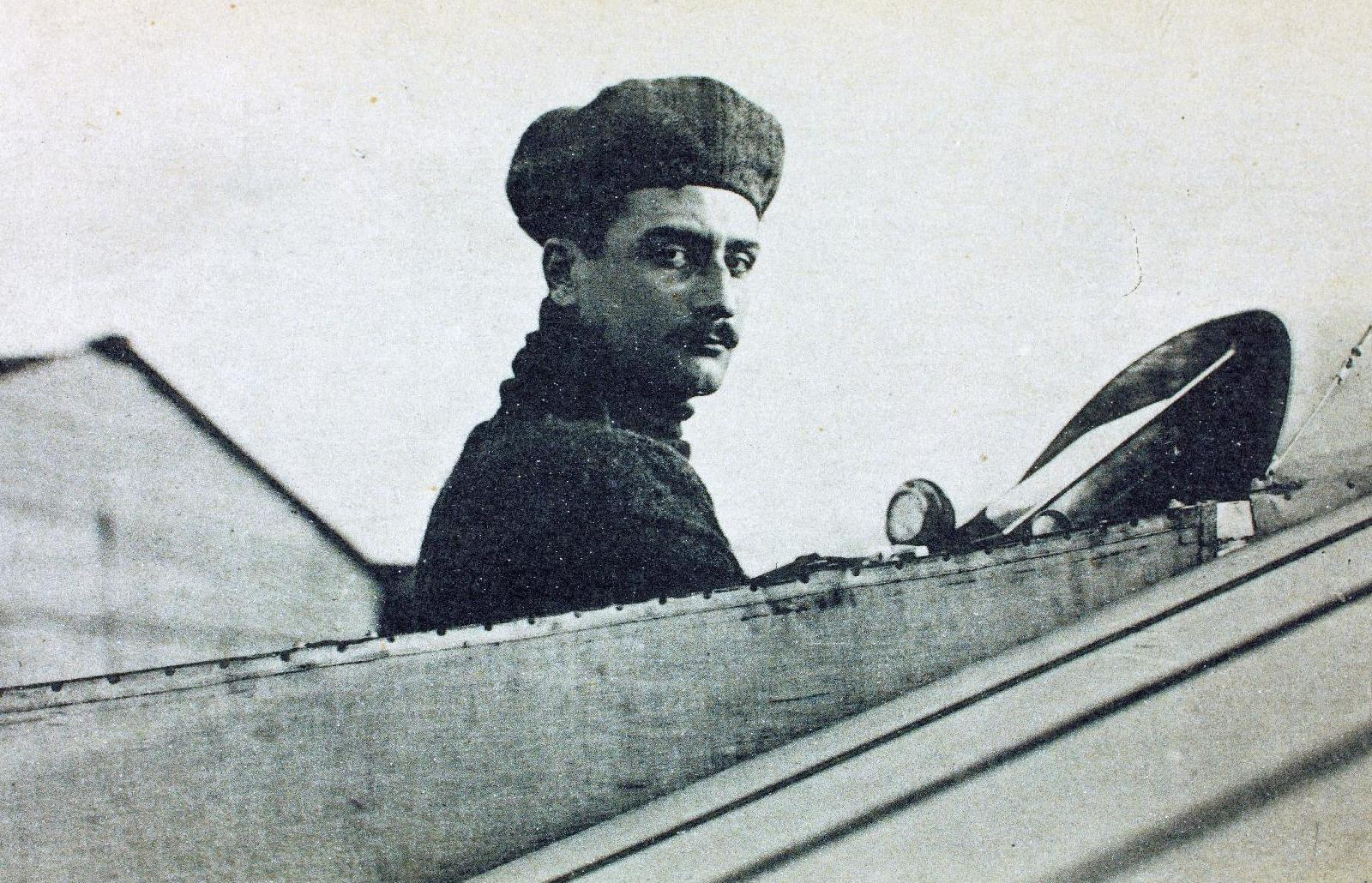
French flying ace Roland Garros

- Liberation of Serbia, Albania and Montenegro – Serbians and French forces liberated Vranje, Serbia from the control of the Central Powers.
- Battle of St Quentin Canal – Australian forces captured Montbrehain, France, and began clearing the Hindenburg Line of German defenses.
- Lost Battalion – German forces continued to attack the hill held by the "lost" American units of the 77th Infantry Division while the 28th Infantry Division and 82nd Infantry Division were dispatched to rescue the surrounded units. The Americans would lose 766 men over the four days of fighting.
- Pursuit to Haritan – British units left Damascus to pursue the retreating Ottoman forces.
- French flying ace Roland Garros died from wounds received after being shot down over Vouziers, Ardennes, France by German ace Hermann Habich from Jagdstaffel 49.
- German submarines SM UB-10, SM UB-40, SM UB-59, and SM UC-4 were scuttled when they could not be moved along with the other retreating Imperial German Navy vessels from the Zeebrugge and Ostend ports in West Flanders, Belgium.
- The art exhibition hall Kunsthalle Bern opened in Bern, Switzerland.
- Died:
  - Robbie Ross, 49, Canadian-British journalist, literary executor and lover to Oscar Wilde (b. 1869)
  - Eddie Grant, 35, American baseball player, third baseman for the Philadelphia Phillies, Cincinnati Reds and New York Giants ball clubs, member of the "Lost Battalion"; killed in action (b. 1883)

== October 6, 1918 (Sunday) ==
- Australia's first electric train service was established between Newmarket and Flemington Racecourse in Melbourne.
- Pursuit to Haritan – The Yildirim Army Group withdraw from Lebanon to Syria, with units from the Ottoman Seventh Army defending the rear. Meanwhile, the British were able to occupy Rayak without resistance.
- Battle of St Quentin Canal – The British 25th Division captured Beaurevoir, France.

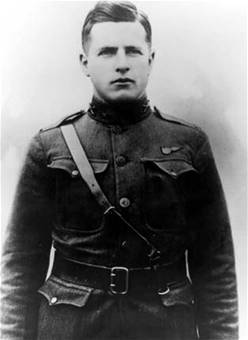
American fighter pilot Erwin R. Bleckley

- Lost Battalion – American fighter pilot Erwin R. Bleckley of the 50th Aero Squadron was shot down and killed while attempting to resupply the 77th Division surrounded by German forces in Argonne Forest, France. He was posthumously awarded the Medal of Honor for his actions.
- The Royal Air Force established air squadron No. 269.
- Royal Navy cruiser HMS Otranto collided with HMS Kashmir in the Atlantic Ocean north east of Ireland before it was driven ashore and wrecked with the loss of 431 lives.
- Silent film star Theda Bara starred in the film adaptation of Salomé, which roused controversy for its mix of biblical and sexual themes and resulted in some American church groups picketing the film.
- Born:
  - Goh Keng Swee, Singaporean state leader, second Deputy Prime Minister of Singapore; in Malacca, Malaysia (d. 2010)
  - George Moore, American track athlete, silver medalist at the 1948 Summer Olympics; in St. Louis (d. 2014)
  - Henry M. Morris, American engineer religious leader, proponent of creationism, co-founder of the Creation Research Society and Institute for Creation Research; in Dallas (d. 2006)
- Died: Erwin R. Bleckley, 23, United States Army fighter pilot, posthumous Medal of Honor recipient; killed in action (b. 1894)

== October 7, 1918 (Monday) ==
- The Polish Regency Council declared Polish independence from the German Empire.
- The Red Army captured the city of Samara, giving them strategic control of the Volga River to strike the Whites holding territory in Buguruslan and Uralsk, Russia.
- The Soviet Red Army established the 25th Rifle Division.
- Born:
  - Mimmo Rotella, Italian artist, noted member of the Ultra-Lettrist and Nouveau réalisme art movements; in Milan (d. 2006)
  - Helmut Dantine, Austrian-American actor and film producer, best known roles in Mrs. Miniver and Casablanca, producer of Bring Me the Head of Alfredo Garcia, The Killer Elite and The Wilby Conspiracy; in Vienna (d. 1982)
  - R. H. C. Davis, British historian, leading expert on the European Middle Ages; in Oxford (d. 1991)
  - Annie Jiagge, Ghanaian judge and activist, author of the Declaration on the Elimination of Discrimination Against Women and co-founder of Women's World Banking; in Lomé, French Togoland (d. 1996)
  - Harry V. Jaffa, American academic, leading thinker for the Claremont Institute; in New York City (d. 2015)
- Died:
  - Hubert Parry, 70, English composer, best known for his choral work "Jerusalem", "I was glad", Blest Pair of Sirens, and "Repton" (b. 1848)
  - Edward Sigerfoos, 49, American Army officer, officer of the 5th Infantry Regiment during the Philippine–American War, commander of the 56th Infantry Brigade during the Meuse–Argonne offensive, recipient of the U.S. Army Distinguished Service Medal, only American general to die while serving in World War I; died from battle wounds (b. 1868)

== October 8, 1918 (Tuesday) ==
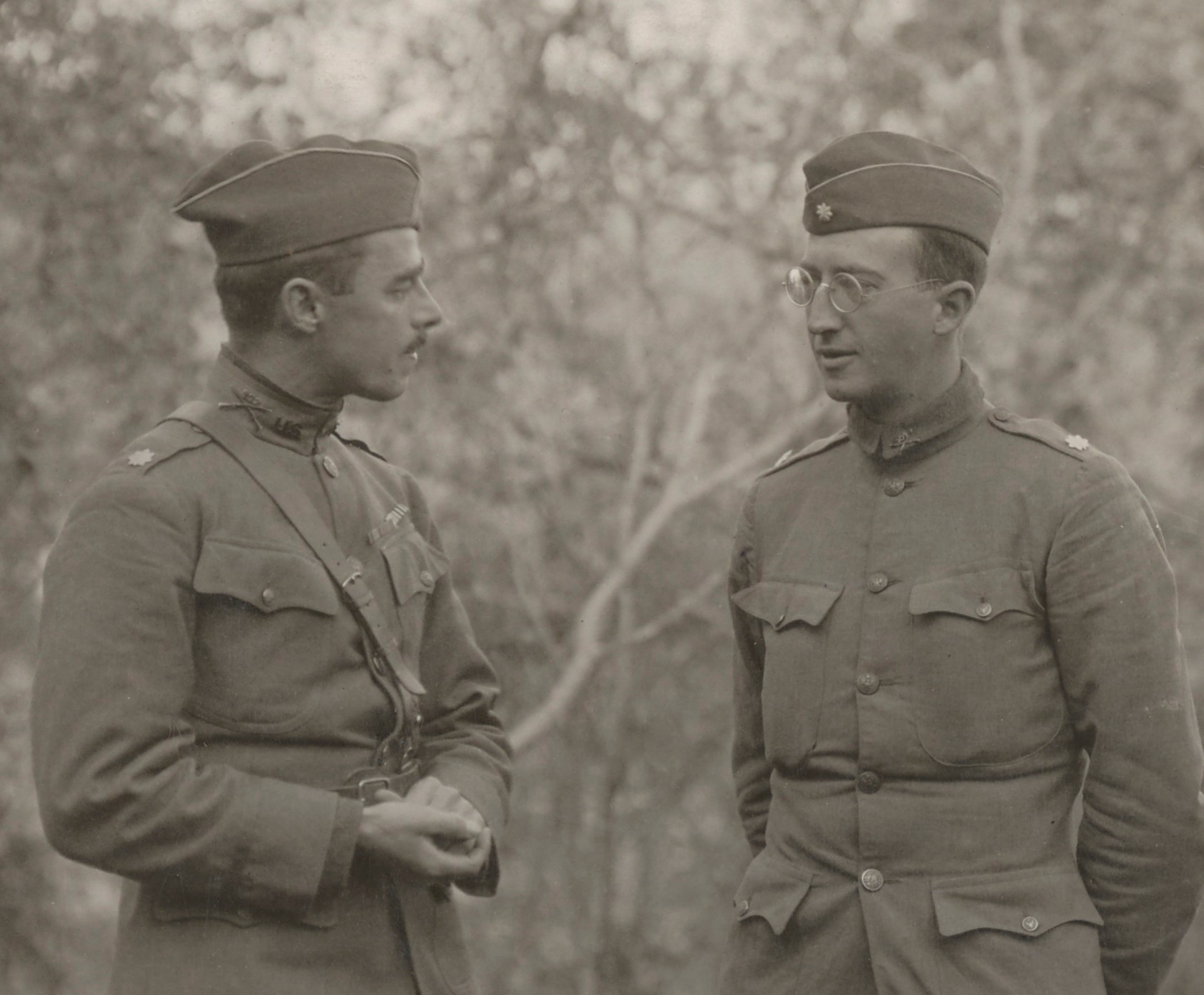
Major Charles W. Whittlesey (right) of the 77th Infantry Division talking to Major Kenny, commander of 307th Infantry, after the "Lost Battalion" was rescued during the Meuse–Argonne offensive.

- Liberation of Serbia, Albania and Montenegro – Austro-Hungarian forces withdrew from Kotor, Montenegro.
- Battle of Cambrai – British forces launched a major attack on the Germans involving 730,000 British, Canadian and Australian troops and 324 tanks, supported by artillery and aircraft. With German defenses so weakened, the Canadian Corps was able to occupy the French city of Cambrai by the end of the day with little resistance.
- Lost Battalion – Army scout Private Abraham Krotoshinsky of the "lost" American units of the 77th Infantry Division found a path through the German line in Argonne Forest and met up with an infiltrating American relief force sent to rescue the stranded unit. Krotoshinsky lead the unit back to relieve the defending units and take the 194 surviving soldiers to safety. Six members of the "Lost Battalion" were awarded the Medal of Honor and unit commander Charles W. Whittlesey was promoted to lieutenant colonel.
- Pursuit to Haritan – The Desert Mounted Corps units entered Beirut where they captured 600 Ottoman prisoners without resistance.
- U.S. Army Corporal Alvin York almost single-handedly killed 25 German soldiers and captured 132 more near Chatel-Chéhéry, France, during the Meuse–Argonne offensive. He was awarded the Medal of Honor and eventually became the most decorated American soldier of World War I.
- Born: Jens Christian Skou, Danish biochemist, recipient of the Nobel Prize in Chemistry for the discovery of the enzyme found in the cell membrane of all animals; in Lemvig, Denmark (d. 2018)
- Died:
  - James B. McCreary, 80, American politician, 27th and 37th Governor of Kentucky, U.S. Senator from Kentucky from 1903 to 1909 (b. 1838)
  - James W. Dawes, 73, American politician, 5th Governor of Nebraska (b. 1845)

== October 9, 1918 (Wednesday) ==
- Prince Frederick Charles of Hesse was elected King of Finland in attempt to retain close ties of the country with the German Empire.
- Pursuit to Haritan – British Field Marshall Edmund Allenby ordered the Desert Mounted Corps to capture Tripoli.
- Born:
  - Lila Kedrova, Russian-French actress, recipient of the Academy Award for Best Supporting Actress for Zorba the Greek; in Petrograd (d. 2000)
  - E. Howard Hunt, American intelligence officer, member of the American intelligence team involved in the 1954 Guatemalan coup d'état, Watergate break-in coordinator; in Hamburg, New York (d. 2007)
  - Charles Read, Australian air force officer, Chief of Air Force from 1972 to 1975, recipient of the Distinguished Flying Cross, Order of the British Empire, Order of the Bath, and Air Force Cross; in Sydney (d. 2014)
- Died:
  - Raymond Duchamp-Villon, 41, French sculptor, known for his works in Cubism including The Large Horse and La Maison Cubiste (b. 1876)
  - Hanns Braun, 31, German runner, bronze and silver medalist in the 1908 Summer Olympics and silver medalist in 1912 Summer Olympics; killed in action (b. 1886)

== October 10, 1918 (Thursday) ==
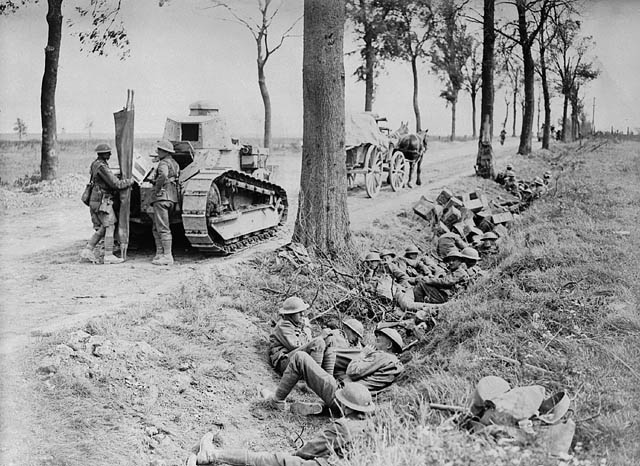
Canadian troops outside Cambrai, France, as the city is taken back from German forces.

- Liberation of Serbia, Albania and Montenegro – French forces liberated Pristina, Kosovo.
- Battle of St Quentin Canal – Most of the fighting around the Hindenburg Line ended. British casualties were 8,802, while the Americans had suffered 13,182 on the opening day of fighting. The Australians had 2,577 casualties. German casualties were unknown but 36,000 soldiers were taken prisoner.
- Battle of Cambrai – The French city of Cambrai was fully in British hands. The Germans suffered 10,000 casualties while the British had 12,000 casualties.
- British cargo ship RMS Leinster was sunk in the Irish Sea by German submarine SM UB-123 with the loss of over 523 lives.
- Pursuit to Haritan – British forces occupied Baalbek, Lebanon, a strategic supply hub, as units advanced on Homs.
- The American Expeditionary Forces established the Second United States Army with General John J. Pershing selecting Lieutenant General Robert Lee Bullard to command.
- The Northwestern Army was established to fight for the White Russians that held Pskov, Russia during the Russian Civil War.
- Born: Yigal Allon, Israeli politician, cabinet minister for the Levi Eshkol and Golda Meir administrations; in Kfar Tavor, Ottoman Empire (d. 1980)
- Died: Henry Dobson, 76, Australian politician, 17th Premier of Tasmania (b. 1841)

== October 11, 1918 (Friday) ==
- Liberation of Serbia, Albania and Montenegro – Allied forces liberated Niš, Serbia before German forces could reach it.
- An earthquake measuring 7.1 in magnitude shook Puerto Rico, killing between 76 and 116 people, including a destructive tsunami that contributed to $29 million in property damage.
- The Imperial German Navy air command proposed that merchant ships be converted into Germany's first aircraft carriers with flight decks.
- The Soviet Red Army established the 8th Rifle Division.
- The Royal Air Force established air squadron No. 156.
- Born: Jerome Robbins, American choreographer, five-time Tony Award winner for his work on many musicals including Peter Pan, The King and I, West Side Story, Gypsy, and Fiddler on the Roof; in New York City (d. 1998)
- Died: Archibald Willard, 82, American painter, best known for the artwork The Spirit of '76 (b. 1836)

== October 12, 1918 (Saturday) ==
- The city of Cloquet, Minnesota and nearby areas were destroyed in a fire that killed 453 people.
- The Imperial German Navy Airship Division flew its last combat mission.
- Troopship RMS Niagara returned to New Zealand, with future New Zealand prime ministers William Massey and Joseph Ward on board. Although it was carrying a number of people ill with influenza, it was not quarantined. Although later cited as the cause of the Spanish flu epidemic in the country, six persons had already died in the three days preceding the ship's arrival.
- The Australian Labor Party established its own newspaper, The Labor News, in Sydney. It was later absorbed by the Labor Daily in 1924.
- The football club Capivariano was established in Capivari, Brazil.
- The Volcano Katla Katla (volcano) in Iceland erupted, the eruption lasted for 24 days.
- Died: Mary Hannay Foott, 72, Australian poet, known for her poetry collections including Where the Pelican Builds and Other Poems (b. 1841)

== October 13, 1918 (Sunday) ==
- The League of Free Nations Association and the League of Nations Society merged to form the League of Nations Union to promote a new system of international relations, human rights and world peace through disarmament.
- The Republic of Zakopane was established in Zakopane, Galicia. Headed by President Stefan Żeromski, the government's primary goal was to push for a unified independent Poland.
- Pursuit to Haritan – The Desert Mounted Corps of the British Army occupied Tripoli without resistance.
- Football club Kvik defeated Brann 4–0 in the final championship game for the Norwegian Football Cup.
- Born:
  - Jack MacGowran, Irish actor, best known for his performances in the Samuel Beckett plays with Abbey Theatre, and for film roles in The Quiet Man, Cul-de-sac and The Exorcist; in Dublin (d. 1973)
  - Colin Pittendrigh, British-American biologist, developer of chronobiology; in Tyne and Wear, England (d. 1996)
  - Robert Walker, American actor, best known for lead roles in Strangers on a Train and Since You Went Away, first husband to Jennifer Jones; in Salt Lake City (d. 1951)

== October 14, 1918 (Monday) ==
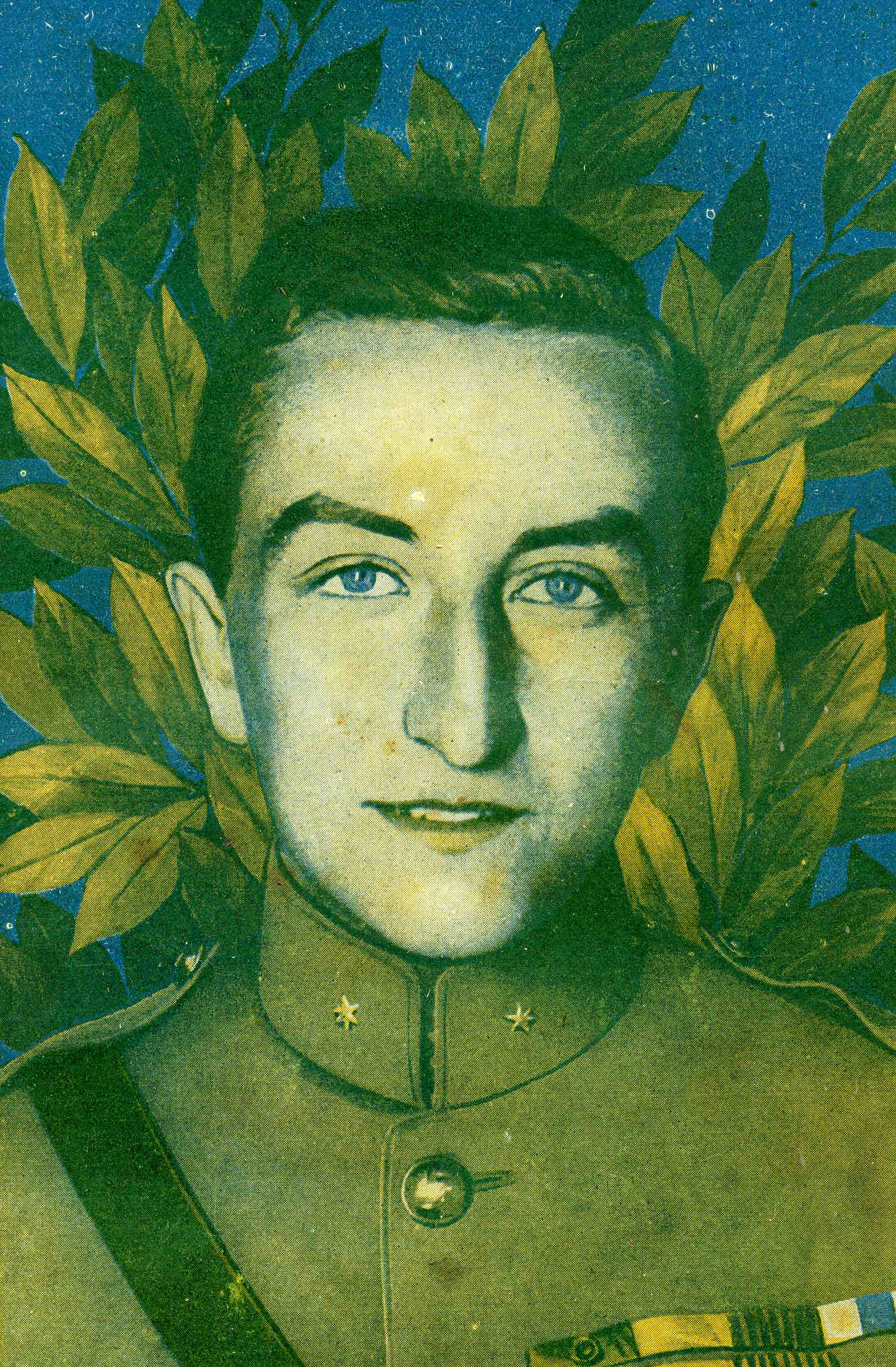
Belgian flying ace Willy Coppens

- Battle of Courtrai – Allied forces began attacking German defenses along the River Lys from Comines-Warneton to Dixmude, Belgium, capturing Cortemarck and Moorslede by the end of the day.
- Meuse–Argonne offensive – American forces began a series of assaults on the Hindenburg Line around Montfaucon, France.
- The provisional government for Czechoslovakia was formed with Czech nationalist leader Tomáš Masaryk as president (even though he was still in exile in the United States).
- The first all-U.S. Marine Corps air combat action in history took place, with eight Airco aircraft bombing Pitthem, Belgium. German aircraft attacked the bombing squadron on the return flight, causing marine pilot Ralph Talbot and gunner Robert G. Robinson to be separated from the rest of their unit. The two ran into a squadron of 12 German fighters but were able to hold them off during the resulting dogfight until Talbot was able to land at a Belgian hospital where Robinson was treated for wounds. The two both received the Medal of Honor for their exploit.
- Malleson mission – A force of 570 British and Indian soldiers defeated Soviet forces at the village of Dushak, Turkestan, inflicting 1,000 Bolshevik casualties while losing 60 killed and 180 wounded.
- After surviving a major attempt on his life days earlier, Belgian flying ace Willy Coppens was wounded after shooting down a German observation balloon near Praatbos, Belgium. It was the last of his 37 victories, 34 of them observation balloons. He was forced to crash-land near Torhout, Belgium, but with the war ending four weeks later, he retained his title as the top-scoring "balloon buster".
- German submarine SM U-139 attacked two Portuguese naval trawlers near the Azores and sunk one, killing six crew, before being hit and forced away. It was the only time a naval battle occurred in the mid-Atlantic during World War I.
- The British Red Cross began operating a military hospital out of Charlton House in Charlton, London, England for World War I soldiers.
- The silent film drama The Goddess of Lost Lake, produced and starring Louise Glaum and directed by Wallace Worsley, was released. The film is now considered lost.
- Born:
  - Thelma Coyne Long, Australian tennis player, winner of 19 Grand Slams; in Sydney (d. 2015)
  - Doug Ring, Australian cricketer, bowler for the Victoria cricket team from 1938 to 1953 and the Australia national cricket team from 1948 to 1953; in Hobart (d. 2003)
  - Ellen Faull, American opera singer, best known for her performances with New York City Opera; in Pittsburgh (d. 2008)
  - Premindra Singh Bhagat, Indian army officer, leading commanding officer during the Sino-Indian War, recipient of the Victoria Cross and Param Vishisht Seva Medal; in Gorakhpur, India (d. 1975)
  - Marcel Chaput, Canadian scientist and activist, founding member of the Quebec nationalist organization Rassemblement pour l'Indépendance Nationale; in Hull, Quebec (d. 1991)
- Died: Louis Lipsett, 44, British-Canadian army officer, commander of the 3rd Canadian Division, recipient of the Order of the Bath and the Order of St Michael and St George; killed in action (b. 1874)

== October 15, 1918 (Tuesday) ==
- Gleb Bokii, leading member of the Cheka secret police in Russia, officially announced the end of the Red Terror, with 800 alleged enemies executed in Petrograd and another 6,229 imprisoned. Official press released estimated total casualties from the crackdown were between 10,000 and 15,000 based on lists of people executed by the state. Arrests and execution continued throughout the Russian Civil War in 1919 and 1920.
- Battle of Courtrai – French forces captured the city of Roulers from the Germans.
- Royal Navy Q-ship HMS Cymric mistook fellow naval submarine HMS J6 as an enemy vessel in the North Sea and shelled it, killing 15 of the 45 crew on board.
- Born: Ratan Shankar Mishra, Indian mathematician, noted for finding the mathematical solutions for unified fluid theory by Albert Einstein, recipient of the Padma Shri; in Ajgaon, India (d. 1999)
- Died:
  - Sai Baba of Shirdi, 79-80, Indian spiritual leader, noted for combining Hindu and Muslim philosophies in yoga (b. 1838)
  - Antonio Cotogni, 87, Italian opera singer, best known for his collaborations with Giuseppe Verdi and instruction at the Accademia Nazionale di Santa Cecilia (b. 1831)

== October 16, 1918 (Wednesday) ==
- Liberation of Serbia, Albania and Montenegro – Allied forces liberated Durrës, Albania.
- Battle of Courtrai – British forces crossed the River Lys at several points into Belgium.
- Pursuit to Haritan – British forces occupied Homs, Lebanon.
- German submarine SM UB-90 was torpedoed and sunk in the Skagerrak off the coasts of Norway and Sweden by Royal Navy sub HMS L12 with the loss of all 38 crew.
- Born:
  - Louis Althusser, French philosopher, developed foundations to structural Marxism; in Birmendreis, French Algeria (d. 1990)
  - Géori Boué, French opera singer, known for her performances with Capitole de Toulouse; in Toulouse, France (d. 2017)
  - Jimmy Keddie, Scottish air force officer, member of the escape team from the German POW camp Stalag Luft III; in Milnathort, Scotland (d. 2000)
  - Tony Rolt, British racing driver, 1953 24 Hours of Le Mans champion; in Bordon, England (d. 2008)
  - Robert S. Strauss, American politician, chairman of the Democratic National Committee from 1972 to 1977, in Lockhart, Texas (d. 2014)
- Died: William V. Rinehart, 82, American army officer and politician, commander of the First Oregon Cavalry and infantry regiments during the Rogue River Wars and American Civil War, member of the Washington State Senate from 1889 to 1890 (b. 1835)

== October 17, 1918 (Thursday) ==
- Liberation of Serbia, Albania and Montenegro – Serbian and French forces liberated Peć, Kosovo.
- Battle of Courtrai – Allied forces recaptured from the Germans the Belgian towns of Thourout and Ostend, and the French towns of Lille and Douai.
- Battle of the Selle – British forces under command of General Henry Rawlinson launched a major attack to push German forces off the east bank of Selle River in France, capturing the French commune of Le Cateau by the end of the day.
- Meuse–Argonne offensive – American forces pushed the Germans out of Argonne Forest in France, while the French reached the Aisne River.
- California University of Pennsylvania and Indiana University of Pennsylvania began an annual football game rivalry that eventually became known as the Coal Bowl after the trophy was sponsored by the Pennsylvania Coal Association.
- Student newspaper The Ubyssey published its first edition for the student body at the University of British Columbia.
- Born:
  - Rita Hayworth, American actress, best known for her lead roles in Gilda, Cover Girl and The Lady from Shanghai; in New York City (d. 1987)
  - Ralph Wilson, American sports executive, founder and first owner of the Buffalo Bills; in Columbus, Ohio (d. 2014)
- Died: Malak Hifni Nasif, 31, Egyptian activist, co-founder of the Union for the Education of Women in Egypt; died of influenza (b. 1886)

== October 18, 1918 (Friday) ==
- The Washington Declaration proclaimed Czechoslovakia an independent republic. The general strike of 14 October 1918 in Prague and other cities.
- The Ukrainian National Council was established in Lemberg to be the governing body of soon to be formed West Ukrainian People's Republic.
- Royal Navy submarine HMS E3 was torpedoed and sunk in the North Sea by German submarine SM U-27 with the loss of all 28 of her crew.
- German submarine SM U-34 departed on patrol and was never seen again. It was believed to have sunk off Gibraltar on or before 9 November with the loss of all 38 crew.
- The Fortaleza Sports Club was established in Fortaleza, Brazil. It was primarily involved in association football but also included futsal, handball and basketball in its activities.
- Born:
  - Bobby Troup, American jazz musician and actor, best known hits "(Get Your Kicks on) Route 66" and in his role the 1970s television drama Emergency!; in Harrisburg, Pennsylvania (d. 1999)
  - Grady Louis McMurtry, American occultist, student of Aleister Crowley, head of Ordo Templi Orientis from 1971 to 1985; in Big Cabin, Oklahoma (d. 1985)
- Died:
  - Radko Dimitriev, 59, Bulgarian and Russian army officer, noted commander in the First and Second Balkan Wars, and World War I, recipient of the Order of St. George and Legion of Honour; executed (b. 1859)
  - Fritz Otto Bernert, 25, German air force officer, commander of Jagdstaffel 2 in World War I; killed in action (b. 1893)
  - Thomas Kearns, 56, Canadian-American industrialist and politician, U.S. Senator from Utah from 1901 to 1905 (b. 1862)

== October 19, 1918 (Saturday) ==
- Battle of Courtrai – Allied forces successfully reclaimed the Belgian cities of Bruges, Courtrai, and Zeebrugge that put the German army into full retreat. Over 12,000 German troops and 550 artillery guns were captured. The battle was also noted for having the last cavalry charge staged in the war, when two squadrons of the Belgian Guides Regiment charged and overran German defenses at Burkel Forest between the villages of Oedelem and Maldegem in Belgium.
- A referendum was held in Iceland on becoming a separate kingdom under the Danish Crown. It was approved by 92% of voters.
- The West Ukrainian People's Republic was established in the former territories of Austria-Hungary.
- The Volga German Autonomous Soviet Socialist Republic was established within Russia next to Kazakh.
- German submarine SM UB-123 struck a mine in the North Sea and sank with all 36 crew killed.
- Royal Navy minesweeper HMS Plumpton struck a mine and was damaged in the North Sea off Ostend, West Flanders, Belgium. She was beached but was declared a total loss.
- The American National Standards Institute was established to oversee standardization processes in products, services, processes and personnel in the United States.
- The hit musical comedy The Better 'Ole, by Bruce Bairnsfather with music by Herman Darewski, opened for its second successful run on Broadway with Charles Coburn in the lead role. The show ran for 353 performances, first at the Cort Theatre and later at the Booth Theatre in New York City.
- The Yser Medal was established by royal decree for members of the Belgian Army that served during the Battle of the Yser in 1914.
- Born:
  - Ian Bazalgette, Canadian air force officer, commander of the No. 635 Squadron during World War II, recipient of the Distinguished Flying Cross and Victoria Cross; in Calgary (d. 1944, killed in action)
  - John Fraser Drummond, British air force officer, member of the No. 46 and No. 92 Squadrons during the Battle of Britain, recipient of the Distinguished Flying Cross; in Liverpool (d. 1940, killed in action)
  - Russell Kirk, American political scientist, author of The Conservative Mind; in Plymouth, Michigan (d. 1994)
- Died: Harold Lockwood, 31, American actor, known for lead film roles in Hearts Adrift and David Harum; died in the Spanish flu pandemic (b. 1887)

== October 20, 1918 (Sunday) ==
- Battle of Courtrai – British forces liberated the French towns of Roubaix and Tourcoing.
- Malleson mission – British forces occupied Tejend, Turkistan. Later, Bolshevik forces left the city of Merv, allowing Transcaspian militia to occupy it and control the entire region.
- The United States Army established the 96th Sustainment Brigade at Camp Wadsworth, South Carolina.
- Charlie Chaplin released his second film with First National Pictures, the war comedy Shoulder Arms, which co-starred Chaplin's older brother Sydney and regular female lead Edna Purviance. This proved to be Chaplin's most popular and critically acclaimed film up to that point.
- Born:
  - Erwin Ballabio, Swiss football player, goalkeeper for Grenchen from 1934 to 1956 and the Switzerland national football team from 1939 to 1947; in Bettlach, Switzerland (d. 2008)
  - Raul Manglapus, Filipino politician, co-founder of the Progressive Party and Christian Democratic Socialist Movement in the Philippines, member of the Senate of the Philippines from 1961 to 1967 and 1987; in Manila (d. 1999)
- Died: Frank Granger Quigley, 24, Canadian air force officer, commander of the No. 70 Squadron, recipient of the Distinguished Service Order and Military Cross for over 30 kills including German ace Walter von Bülow-Bothkamp; died in the Spanish flu pandemic (b. 1894)

== October 21, 1918 (Monday) ==
- Germany suspended all submarine warfare and ordered all subs to port, ending its Atlantic U-boat campaign.
- Parliamentary elections were held in Norway, with a first round of votes in October and a second in early November.
- Pursuit to Haritan – Rampant illness and exhaustion among British troops forced Field Marshal Edmumd Allenby to reorganize units among the Desert Mounted Corps and 21st Corps before ordering to occupy Hama, Lebanon and advance north to Aleppo.
- German naval cruiser SMS Frankfurt collided with fellow naval submarine SM UB-89 in the port of Kiel, Germany, killing seven crew on board. The submarine was raised on October 30.
- Leon Trotsky established the Registration Agency as a foreign intelligence agency for the Red Army, the predecessor for the Main Intelligence Directorate (GRU), with Semyon Aralov as its first director.
- The Ministry of Finance for the government of Azerbaijan was established.
- The Royal Air Force established air squadron No. 185.
- Canadian Northern Railway opened the Mount Royal Tunnel for regular traffic between Montreal and Toronto.
- The American Club held its inaugural meeting at the Savoy Hotel in London, reflecting the growing community of American expatriates in England.
- Born:
  - Hulett C. Smith, American politician, 27th Governor of West Virginia; in Beckley, West Virginia (d. 2012)
  - Albertina Sisulu, South African activist, opponent to apartheid with husband Walter Sisulu; in Tsomo, South Africa (d. 2011)
- Died: Charles Sanford Olmsted, 65, American clergy, Bishop of Colorado from 1902 to 1918 (b. 1853)

== October 22, 1918 (Tuesday) ==
- Battle of Courtrai – British forces reached the Scheldt River in Belgium from Valenciennes to Avelghem.
- Pursuit to Haritan – British forces reached Khan al-Sabil, Syria where they sighted the enemy for the first time.
- Born: Harry Walker, American baseball player and manager, outfielder for the St. Louis Cardinals from 1940 to 1955, also manager for St. Louis Cardinals, Pittsburgh Pirates and Houston Astros; in Pascagoula, Mississippi (d. 1999)
- Died: Myrtle Gonzalez, 27, American actress, first known Hispanic movie star, known for lead film roles in The Kiss and Captain Alvarez (b. 1891)

== October 23, 1918 (Wednesday) ==
- Battle of Sharqat – British Indian forces under the command of Alexander Cobbe were dispatched to engage the Ottoman Sixth Army under command of İsmail Hakkı Bey who were defending the line between Baghdad and Mosul.
- Józef Świeżyński was appointed prime minister to begin the process of moving towards for an independent Poland and to establish the Polish Army.
- The Soviet Red Army established the 17th Rifle Division.
- Born:
  - Augusta Dabney, American actress, best known for her work in the television soap opera Loving; in Berkeley, California (d. 2008)
  - James Daly, American actor, best known for his role in the 1970s television drama Medical Center; in Wisconsin Rapids, Wisconsin (d. 1978)
  - Paul Rudolph, American architect and academic, designer of Rudolph Hall at Yale University, chair of the Yale School of Architecture; in Elkton, Kentucky (d. 1997)
  - Mato Dukovac, Croatian air force officer, member of the Air Force of the Independent State of Croatia and Royal Yugoslav Air Force during World War II; in Surčin, Belgrade, Croatia (d. 1990)
- Died: Henry James Nicholas, 27, New Zealand soldier, recipient of the Military Medal and Victoria Cross for action during the Hundred Days Offensive; killed in action (b. 1891)

== October 24, 1918 (Thursday) ==
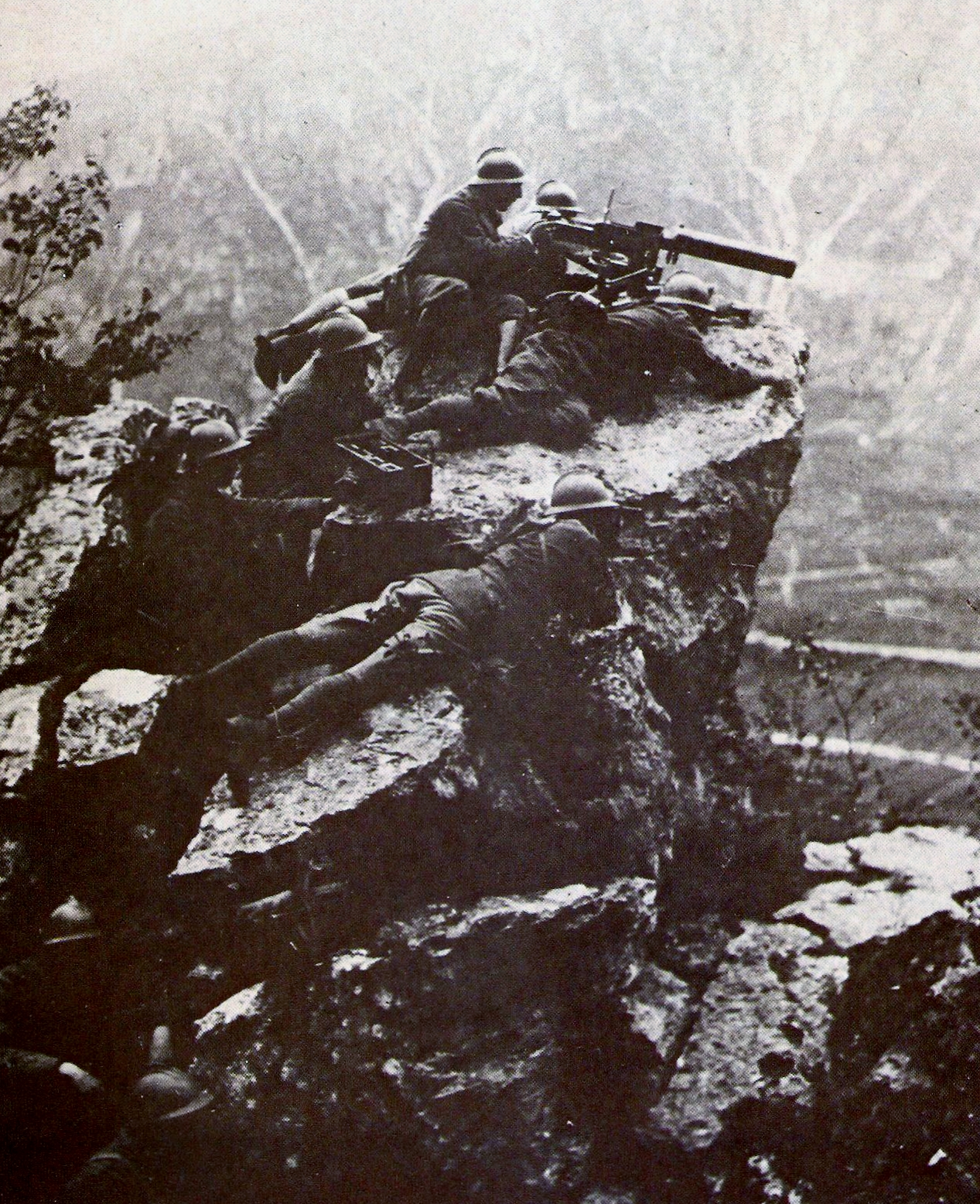
Italian machine gunners on Monte Grappa during the Battle of Vittorio Veneto.

- Battle of Vittorio Veneto – The Italian Army launched a major assault on Austro-Hungarian positions at Vittorio Veneto, Italy, one year after the disastrous Battle of Caporetto. The assault was so intense that over the next seven days, close to 2.5 million shells were fired. As well, The Italian Military Aviation Corps fielded 400 aircraft which were to oppose at least 470 enemy aircraft.
- A naval order was issued by the German Admiralty, calling on the High Seas Fleet to provoke a decisive battle against the Royal Navy Grand Fleet in the North Sea, but only fueled dissent among fleet sailors that lead to the Kiel mutiny days later.
- Born: Frank O'Flynn, New Zealand politician, cabinet minister for the David Lange administration; in Greymouth, New Zealand (d. 2003)
- Died: Daniel Burley Woolfall, 66, English sports executive, second President of FIFA (b. 1852)

== October 25, 1918 (Friday) ==
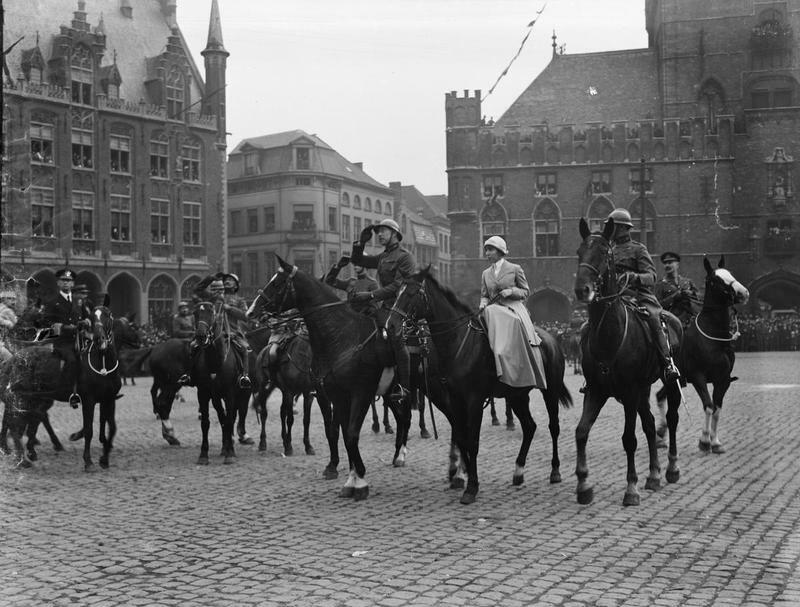
King Albert of Belgium with his wife, Queen Elisabeth enter Bruges after its liberation from the Germans alongside Admiral Roger Keyes (far left) and the 1st Earl of Athlone (far right).

- Arab forces loyal to Prince Faisal captured Aleppo.
- Battle of the Selle – British forces routed most of the German army from Selle River in France, capturing the French commune of Le Cateau by the end of the day.
- The steamer Princess Sophia sank on Vanderbilt Reef near Juneau, Alaska, killing 353 people in the greatest maritime disaster in the Pacific Northwest of North America.
- American marine pilot Ralph Talbot died in a crash during a test flight 11 days after the action for which he received a posthumous Medal of Honor in 1920.
- Japanese electronics manufacturer Nitto Denko was founded in Ōsaki, Tokyo, Japan.
- Born:
  - David Ausubel, American psychologist, leading researcher in educational psychology; in New York City (d. 2008)
  - Manuel Carbonell, Cuban-American sculptor, best known for his work for the Brickell Avenue Bridge in Miami; in Sancti Spíritus Cuba (d. 2011)
  - Bobby Gimby, Canadian musician, best known for hit song "Canada" written specifically for the Canadian Centennial and Expo 67, recipient of the Order of Canada; in Cabri, Saskatchewan (d. 1998)
  - Donald Wiseman, British archaeologist, Professor of Assyriology at the University of London from 1961 to 1982; in Emsworth, England (d. 2010)
- Died: Walter Harper, 25, American mountain climber, first person to reach the summit of Mount McKinley (now Denali), member of the Koyukon people in Alaska; died in the sinking of Princess Sophia (b. 1893)

== October 26, 1918 (Saturday) ==
- Pursuit to Haritan – Two regiments of the British Indian 5th Cavalry Division charged the remaining units of the Ottoman Yildirim Army Group at Haritan, Ottoman Syria in what was the last conflict with Ottoman forces in World War I. The charge left 50 dead on the Ottoman side and 20 prisoners, while the British Indian force suffered 21 dead, 56 wounded and three missing in action.
- The Mid-European Union released the Declaration of Common Aims for the many new sovereign nations in central Europe during a forum gathering at Independence Hall in Philadelphia.
- Edwin Corboy, 21, won the by-election in the Division of Swan, Australia following the death of the sitting member John Forrest, making him the youngest ever Australian Member of Parliament until Wyatt Roy, aged 20, won the Division of Longman in the 2010 Australian federal election.
- English landowner Cecil Chubb donated Stonehenge to the United Kingdom.
- Born:
  - Anton Hartman, South African conductor, known for his collaborations with the South African Broadcasting Corporation; in Johannesburg (d. 1982)
  - Snuffy Stirnweiss, American baseball player, second baseman for the New York Yankees for three World Series championships; in New York City (d. 1958)
- Died:
  - Olivier Freiherr von Beaulieu-Marconnay, 20, German air force officer, commander of Jagdstaffel 19, recipient of the Pour le Mérite and Iron Cross (b. 1898)
  - César Ritz, 68, Swiss business leader, founder of the famous Ritz hotel chain including the Ritz Hotel in Paris and the Ritz Hotel in London (b. 1850)

== October 27, 1918 (Sunday) ==
- Battle of Vittorio Veneto – The Italian army with British and American support established a bridgehead 2.5 miles (4.0 km) deep and 5 miles (8.0 km) broad into enemy territory. Mutinying troops on the Austro-Hungarian side prevented any counterattack on the position.
- German submarine U-78 was torpedoed and sunk in the Skagerrak off the coasts of Norway and Sweden by Royal Navy submarine HMS G2 with the loss of all 40 crew.
- Italian flying ace Pier Ruggero Piccio was shot down by enemy ground fire and captured by Austro-Hungarian troops. He finished the war with 24 victories, the third-highest-scoring Italian ace of World War I.
- Born:
  - Edgar Herschler, American politician, 28th Governor of Wyoming; in Kemmerer, Wyoming (d. 1990)
  - Jens-Anton Poulsson, Norwegian army officer, commander of the Hans Majestet Kongens Garde, recipient of the War Cross and Distinguished Service Order for resistance operations during World War II; in Tinn Municipality, Norway (d. 2010)
  - Teresa Wright, American actress, three-time Oscar nominee for roles in The Little Foxes, Mrs. Miniver, and The Pride of the Yankees; in New York City (d. 2005)
- Died:
  - Alexander Protopopov, 51, Russian politician, Minister of Interior from 1916 to 1917; executed (b. 1866)
  - William Walsh, 81-82, British clergy, Bishop of Mauritius from 1889 to 1891 and Bishop of Dover from 1898 to 1910 for the Church of England (b. 1836)

== October 28, 1918 (Monday) ==
Czechoslovakia

- Czechoslovakia declared its independence from Austria-Hungary.
- The Aster Revolution started when Count Mihály Károlyi proclaimed the newly created Hungarian National Council would seek to dissolve the union between Hungary and Austria.
- Battle of Vittorio Veneto – With Austria-Hungary dissolving, the Austro-Hungarian high command ordered a general retreat from all positions in northern Italy.
- Liberation of Serbia, Albania and Montenegro – Allied forces captured Makri, Evros in Macedonia, some 30 km from the Turkish border.
- German submarine SM UB-116 struck a mine and was then depth charged and sunk off the Orkney Island, United Kingdom with the loss of all 36 crew.
- French ace Michel Coiffard was gravely wounded during a dogfight with German Fokker fighters over Bergnicourt, France, but managed to fly back to base, where he died of his wounds. His 34 kills made him the sixth-highest scoring French ace of World War I.
- American flying ace Field Eugene Kindley and gunner Jesse Orin Creech shared the kill of a German Fokker plane near Villers-Pol, France. It was the last of Kindley's 12 aerial victories.
- Several German submarines including SM U-47, SM U-65, SM UB-48, SM UC-25, and SM UC-53 were scuttled at Pula, Austria-Hungary, while SM UC-54 was scuttled at Trieste, Italy.
- The Luftstreitkräfte, the air arm of the Imperial German Army, established air squadrons Jagdstaffel 82, 83, 84, 85, 86, 87, 88, 89, and 90.
- The London and Lake Erie Railway and Transportation Company ceased operations and was put up for sale, with most of its assets eventually sold to the Niagara, St. Catharines and Toronto Railway.
- The Sancti Petri Lighthouse was installed near Sancti Petri island ruins of the southern Spain coastline.
- Died: Albert Hastings Markham, 76, British naval officer and explorer, leading commander of the Nukapu Expedition from 1871 to 1872, member of the British Arctic Expedition of 1875 to 1876, designer of the New Zealand flag, recipient of the Order of the Bath (b. 1841)

== October 29, 1918 (Tuesday) ==
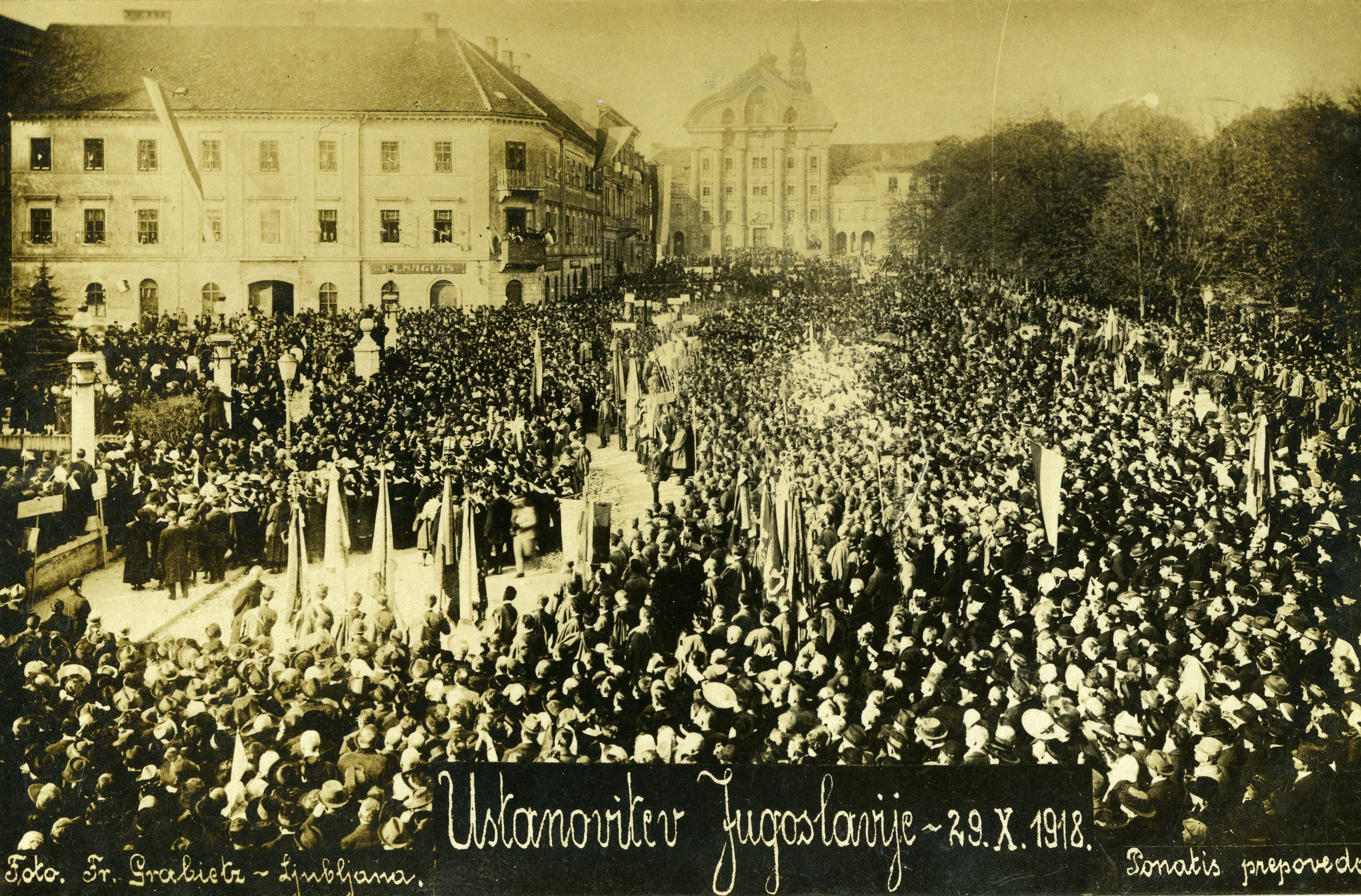
People gather in Congress Square, Ljubljana to celebrate the formation of the State of Slovenes, Croats and Serbs.

- The provisional State of Slovenes, Croats and Serbs was proclaimed in Zagreb, with Anton Korošec as president, from the former monarchies of the Kingdom of Croatia-Slavonia, Duchy of Carniola, Kingdom of Dalmatia, and Bosnia and Herzegovina.
- Battle of Sharqat – After six days of retreating from the pursuing British Indian forces, the Ottoman Sixth Army held the line south of Mosul at a cost of many killed and wounded. The British Indian force took 13,000 prisoners and lost 1800 killed or wounded.
- Battle of Vittorio Veneto – Allied forces occupied Vittorio Veneto, Italy.
- Wilhelm Groener replaced Erich Ludendorff as the Deputy Chief of the General Staff under General Paul von Hindenburg.
- Crews of several ships in the German High Seas Fleet mutinied at the port of Wilhelmshaven, Germany, or offshore nearby, following a naval order issued five days earlier to engage the Royal Navy in a decisive battle in the North Sea.
- Danish Air Lines was established as the national airline for Denmark until it merged with Scandinavian Airlines in 1953.
- The All-Union Leninist Young Communist League, or Komsomol, was established as the main youth organization of the new Soviet Union.
- Born:
  - Diana Serra Cary, American actress, known for her child actor roles in Captain January and The Family Secret; in San Diego (d. 2020)
  - Ștefan Baciu, Romanian-Brazilian poet, best known for his contributions to the expressionism movement and to the Romanian literary magazine Gândirea; in Brașov, Austria-Hungary (d. 1993)
- Died:
  - Rudolf Tobias, 45, Estonian composer, known for his collaborations with the Estonia Theatre and Royal Academy of Music (b. 1873)
  - Michel Oreste, 59, Haitian state leader, 21st President of Haiti (b. 1859)

== October 30, 1918 (Wednesday) ==
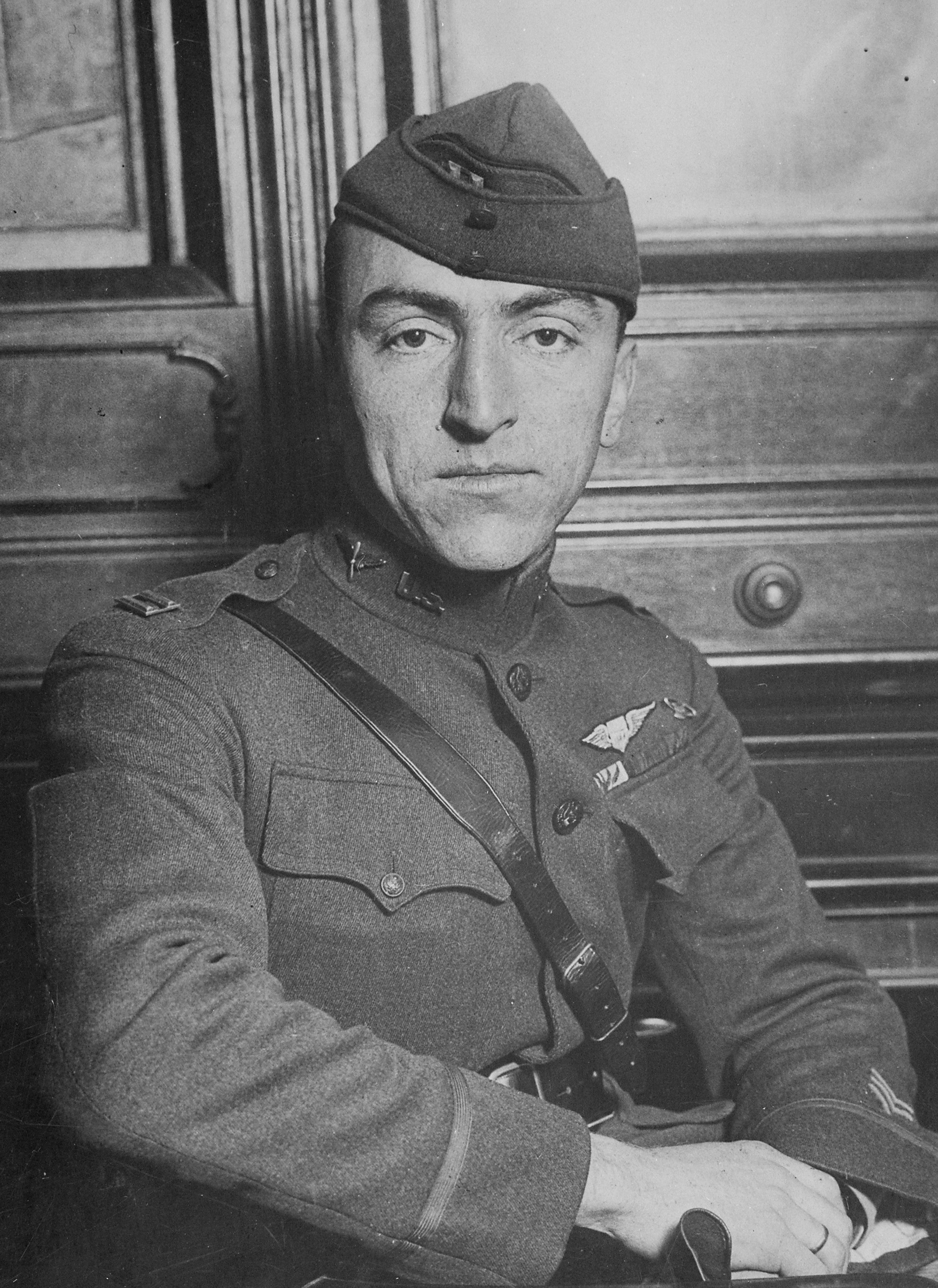
American flying ace Eddie Rickenbacker

- The Armistice of Mudros ended conflict between the Ottoman Empire and the Allies. It was signed by the Ottoman Minister of Marine Affairs Rauf Orbay and Royal Navy Admiral Somerset Gough-Calthorpe on board HMS Agamemnon in Moudros harbor on the Greek island of Lemnos.
- The Mutawakkilite Kingdom of Yemen was granted independence from the Ottoman Empire by the Armistice of Mudros.
- The Martin Declaration was published, which included Slovakia in the formation of the Czecho-Slovak state.
- Widespread mutiny among the Imperial German Navy forced a plan to attack the Royal Navy to be called off.
- Battle of Sharqat – Ottoman forces under command of İsmail Hakkı Bey dug in to defend the line between Baghdad and Mosul formally surrendered to the British once word of the armistice reached them, ending the Mesopotamian campaign and all fighting between the British and Ottoman empires.
- Canadian navy patrol vessel HMCS Galiano was lost in a storm in Barkley Sound, British Columbia with all 39 crew.
- American ace Eddie Rickenbacker shot down a German observation balloon near Remonville, France while flying a SPAD fighter plane for his 26th and final aerial victory. His 26 victories (22 airplanes and four balloons) made him the top-scoring American ace of World War I.
- German submarine SM U-73 was scuttled at Kotor, Montenegro, while fellow sub SM UC-34 was scuttled at Pula, Austria-Hungary.
- Born: Frank Minis Johnson, American judge, justice for the United States Court of Appeals for the Eleventh Circuit from 1981 to 1991; in Haleyville, Alabama (d. 1999)
- Died: James Walker Hood, 87, American religious leader and activist, bishop for the African Methodist Episcopal Zion Church in North Carolina and first president of the Colored Conventions Movement (b. 1831)

== October 31, 1918 (Thursday) ==
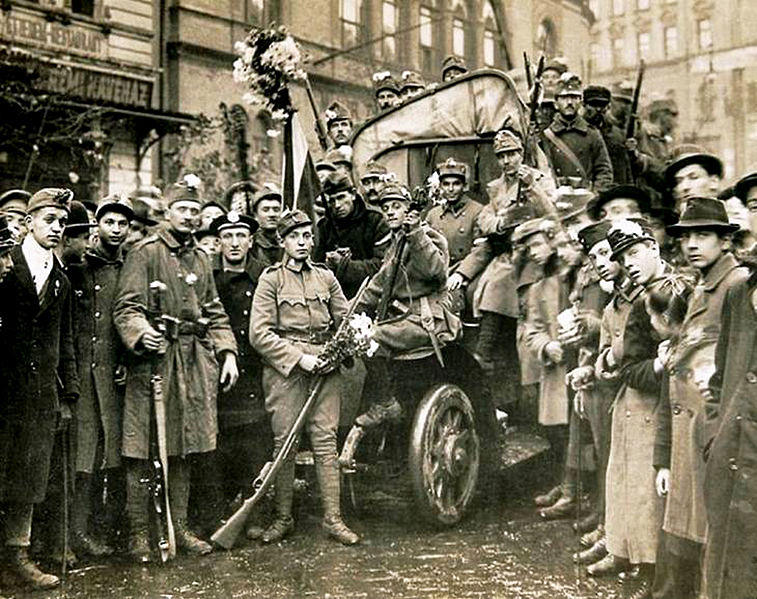
Hungarian revolutionary soldiers in Budapest during the Aster Revolution, which lead to an independent Hungary.

- The Aster Revolution ended with a coup, with revolutionaries supported by the Royal Hungarian Army seizing public buildings in Budapest. Prime Minister Sándor Wekerle resigned from his position while former prime minister István Tisza was assassinated in his home. By the end of the day, Austro-Hungarian Emperor Charles accepted the coup and appointed Mihály Károlyi as prime minister, who dissolved the Kingdom of Hungary and proclaimed a new republic.
- Battle of Vittorio Veneto – Italian forces pushed on Monte Grappa in the Alps and recovered much of the ground lost at the start of the Italian campaign. Fighting was intense and 24,507 Italian casualties were recorded.
- Meuse–Argonne offensive – American forces pushed the Germans out of Argonne Forest in France while the French reached the Aisne River.
- Liberation of Serbia, Albania and Montenegro – Serbian forces liberated Podgorica, Montenegro, while Italian and French forces recaptured Shkodër, Albania. Meanwhile, British forces had occupied the Bulgarian cities of Pleven, Ruse, and Veliko Tarnovo.
- Pursuit to Haritan – British forces learned an armistice had been signed between the Ottoman Empire and the Allies, ending the advance just short of Homs, Syria. In all, the British captured between 75,000 and 100,000 prisoners and 360 guns since the start of the pursuit on September 18. British casualties were recorded at 782 killed and 4,179 wounded soldiers.
- German submarine SM UB-129 was scuttled at Rijeka, Croatia.
- The Polish Telegraphic Agency was established as the official news agency for independent Poland.
- The extension to the Daegu railline in Korea was established to link to the seaport Pohang.
- War poet Wilfred Owen wrote his last letter home to his mother while seeking shelter in a cellar in France. He was killed in action 4 days later.
- Born:
  - Ian Stevenson, Canadian-born American psychologist, known for his research into reincarnation; in Montreal (d. 2007)
  - Konstantinos Mitsotakis, Greek state leader, Prime Minister of Greece from 1990 to 1993; in Halepa, Greece (d. 2017)
- Died: Egon Schiele, 28, Austrian artist, known for erotic and provocative works including Portrait of Wally; died of influenza (b. 1890)
