= Where the Pelican Builds =

Poem by Mary Hannay Foott

- by Mary Hannay Foott
- First published in: The Australasian
- Country: Australia
- Language: English
- Publication date: 5 March 1881

Full text
- Where the Pelican Builds at Wikisource

Where the Pelican Builds is a poem by Australian poet Mary Hannay Foott. It was first published in The Australasian newspaper on 5 March 1881, as by "M. H. F.", and later in the poet's collection Where the Pelican Builds and Other Poems (1885).

E. S. Wilkinson, in "The Brisbane Courier" in 1932, writes that the poem was inspired by the story of two brothers, Cornelius and Albert Prout. These men, who came from Sydney originally, had moved to Queensland to work on the land and over the years tended to move further west looking for "some fine country" they could take up. In December 1877 they set off from western Queensland towards the South Australian/Northern Territory border area and were never heard from again. Mary Hannay Foott, who lived in the region from where the men set out, heard the tale from the grieving parents, and based this poem on the brothers' search.

The poem has been adapted into a choral arrangement by Mark Puddy.

== Analysis ==
On the poem's publication in the author's collection Where the Pelican Builds and Other Poems, a reviewer in the Queensland Figaro and Punch opined that the poem "though very short, is as striking a poetic deliverance as I have seen for a long time, and even the slight obscurity of meaning in the last few lines lends an air of mysticism to a conclusion which contrasts strongly with, and not unpleasingly tempers the intense realism of, the opening."

The Oxford Companion to Australian Literature states that the poem "records, from the viewpoint of the waiting women, the tragedy that so frequently struck the pioneer families - the loss of loved ones who were drawn by the lure of the land further out."

== Further publications ==
- "The Bulletin", 12 March 1881
- "The Bulletin", 16 May 1896
- "The Bookfellow", 29 April 1899
- An Anthology of Australian Verse edited by Bertram Stevens (1907)
- The Golden Treasury of Australian Verse edited by Bertram Stevens (1909)
- The Children's Treasury of Australian Verse edited by Bertram Stevens and George Mackaness (1913)
- A Book of Queensland Verse (1924)
- An Australasian Anthology : Australian and New Zealand Poems edited by Percival Serle, R. H. Croll and Frank Wilmot (1927)
- New Song in an Old Land edited by Rex Ingamells (1943)
- Australian Bush Songs and Ballads edited by Will Lawson (1944)
- Favourite Australian Poems edited by Ian Mudie (1963)
- From the Ballads to Brennan edited by T. Inglis Moore (1964)
- Bards in the Wilderness : Australian Colonial Poetry to 1920 edited by Adrian Mitchell and Brian Elliott (1970)
- The Illustrated Treasury of Australian Verse edited by Beatrice Davis (1984)
- My Country : Australian Poetry and Short Stories, Two Hundred Years edited by Leonie Kramer (1985)
- The Macmillan Anthology of Australian Literature edited by Ken L. Goodwin and Alan Lawson (1990)
- The Penguin Book of Australian Ballads edited by Elizabeth Webby and Philip Butterss (1993)
- The Oxford Book of Australian Women's Verse edited by Susan Lever (1995)
- Australian Verse : An Oxford Anthology edited by John Leonard (1998)
- Our Country : Classic Australian Poetry : From the Colonial Ballads to Paterson & Lawson edited by Michael Cook (2004)
- An Anthology of Australian Poetry to 1920 edited by John Kinsella (2007)
- 100 Australian Poems You Need to Know edited by Jamie Grant (2008)
- The Penguin Anthology of Australian Poetry edited by John Kinsella (2009)
- Macquarie PEN Anthology of Australian Literature edited by Nicholas Jose, Kerryn Goldsworthy, Anita Heiss, David McCooey, Peter Minter, Nicole Moore and Elizabeth Webby (2009)
- 60 Classic Australian Poems for Children edited by Chris Cheng (2009)
- The Puncher & Wattmann Anthology of Australian Poetry edited by John Leonard (2009)
- Australian Poetry Since 1788 edited by Geoffrey Lehmann and Robert Gray (2011)

== See also ==
- 1881 in poetry
- 1881 in literature
- 1881 in Australian literature
- Australian literature
