= Cecil Foott =

Australian Army officer

Cecil Henry Foott
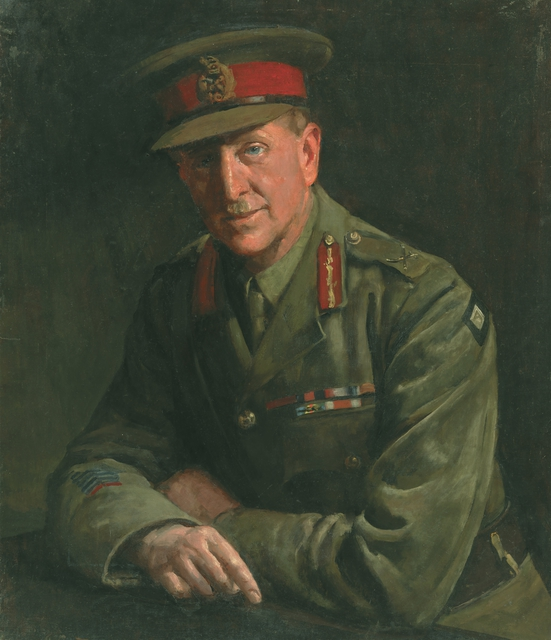
- Portrait by George James Coates
- Born: 16 January 1876; Bourke, New South Wales
- Died: 27 June 1942 (aged 66); Upper Beaconsfield, Victoria
- Burial place: Berwick cemetery, Berwick, Victoria
- Relatives: Mary Hannay Foott (mother)
- Military career
- Allegiance: Australia
- Branch: Australian Army
- Service years: 1895–1936; 1940–1942
- Rank: Brigadier General
- Commands: Southern Division, Volunteer Defence Corps (1940–42); 4th Division (1930–31); 3rd Military District (1930–31); 1st Military District (1926–29); 11th Mixed Brigade (1926–29)
- Conflicts: First World War; Gallipoli campaign; Western Front
- Awards: Companion of the Order of the Bath; Companion of the Order of St Michael and St George; Mentioned in Despatches (7); Officer of the Order of the White Eagle (Serbia)

Brigadier General Cecil Henry Foott CB, CMG (16 January 1876 – 27 June 1942) was a senior Australian Army officer who served as Chief Engineer of the Australian Corps in the First World War. He was educated as an engineer and, serving with distinction in senior staff and engineering positions through the First World War, was seven times mentioned in despatches.

== Early life and career ==
Cecil Henry Foott was born on 16 January 1876 at Bourke, New South Wales, the son of a station owner, Thomas Wade Foott and his wife, the poet Mary Hannay (née Black). He was educated at Brisbane Grammar School and Toowoomba Grammar School, and qualified as a mechanical engineer.

In 1895, Foott was commissioned into the Queensland Militia Garrison Artillery as a second lieutenant. The following September he was commissioned as a lieutenant in the Permanent Military Forces, in the Queensland Artillery. In July 1901 he was promoted to captain in the Royal Australian Artillery.

In 1902 Foott transferred to the Royal Australian Engineers. After a year of training in England in 1908, he became Chief Engineer in Victoria in 1909. He was promoted to major on 1 August 1909, served as Director of Works from 1910 to 1911 and then as Director of Engineers from 1911 to 1912. In 1912–13 he attended the Staff College, Camberley in England, and was still on duty in the England on the staff of Southern Command when the war broke out.

== First World War ==
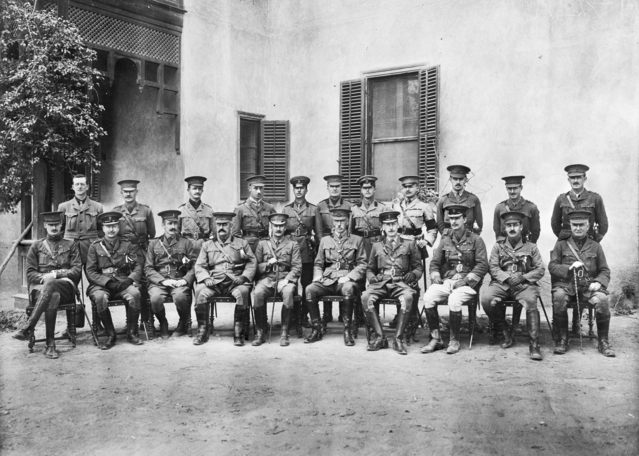
Group portrait of 1st Division staff officers at Mena Camp, December 1914. Foott, then a major, is in the front row, second from the left.

Being one of only six staff college graduates in the Army, this made Foott in demand for staff duties and on the outbreak of the First World War Major General William Bridges immediately requested him for the 1st Division staff as Deputy Assistant Adjutant General. This part of the division staff was concerned with personnel administration. Foott joined the staff in Egypt in January 1915.

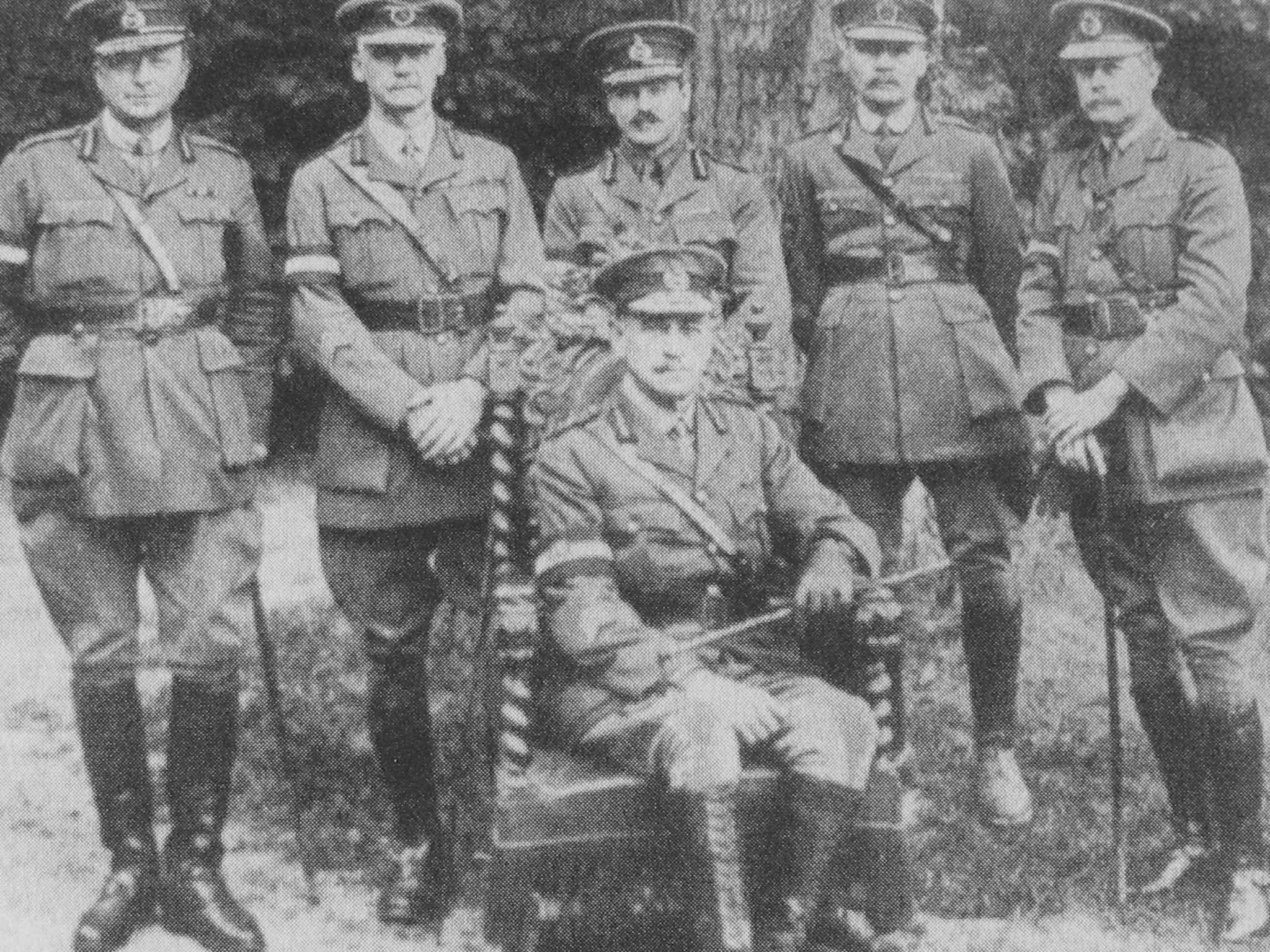
Lieutenant-General John Monash (seated, centre) at his headquarters in France, March 1918. Brigadier General Foott stands on the far left.

Foott was determined that the men should always be supplied properly, and made a point of letting the officers of the Lines of Communication, living palatially on board the Aragon, know exactly what he thought of them whenever they placed obstacles in his way. He remained in the post for two years. In France he found the logistics far more complex, but much better organised, and increasingly free of shortages, he was able to deliver there a quality of service that he had never been able to achieve at Gallipoli.

On 23 July 1917 Foott became assistant adjutant and quartermaster general of the AIF Depots in the United Kingdom, with the temporary rank of brigadier general. Then on 17 March 1918 he became Chief Engineer of the Australian Corps. It was his first engineering post since before the war. Foott called conferences of his engineers and tried to build up a sense of esprit amongst the corps. Increasingly, the engineering effort was driven by corps, as the engineers attempted to keep the troops and supplies moving forwards.

== Post war ==
After the war ended, Foott became deputy director of Repatriation, working under Lieutenant General Sir John Monash. Foott himself returned to Australia in November 1919.

Foott became a colonel and honorary brigadier general in the Staff Corps. He served at first in the Quartermaster General's Branch at Army Headquarters. In 1926 he became Commandant of the 1st Military District in Queensland. Then in 1930 he became Commandant of the 3rd Military District and commander of the 4th Division in Victoria.

In July 1931, Foott was transferred to the Reserve of Officers. He was placed on the Retired List in February 1936 as an honorary brigadier general.

He died on 27 June 1942 and was buried at Berwick Cemetery.
