= Ratan Shankar Mishra =

Indian mathematician and academic (1918–1999)

- Born: 15 October 1918; Ajgain, Unnao district, Uttar Pradesh, India
- Died: 23 August 1999 (aged 80); India
- Occupations: Mathematician, academic
- Years active: 1944-1999
- Known for: Unified fluid theory
- Awards: Padma Shri; Banerjee Prize; IMS Distinguished Service Award; Teachers' Day Award

Ratan Shankar Mishra (1918–1999) was an Indian mathematician and academic who was known for his solutions to the Unified fluid theory of Albert Einstein. He headed the department of Mathematics of the University of Gorakhpur (1958) and University of Allahabad (1963-1968) and served as the vice chancellor of Lucknow University (1982-1985), as a reader at University of Delhi (1954-1958) and as the dean at Banares Hindu University, Varanasi (1965-1968). He was honoured by the Government of India in 1971 with Padma Shri, the fourth highest Indian civilian award.

== Biography ==
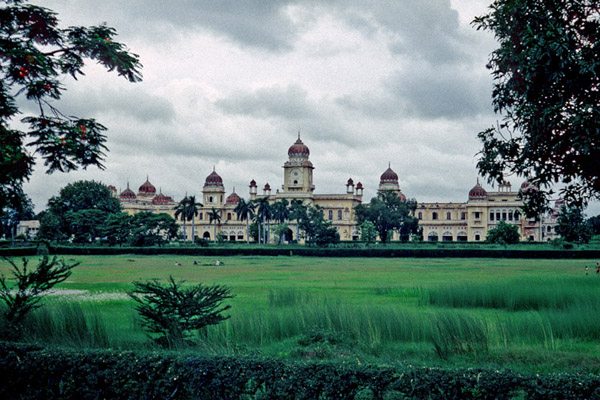
Lucknow University - Old campus

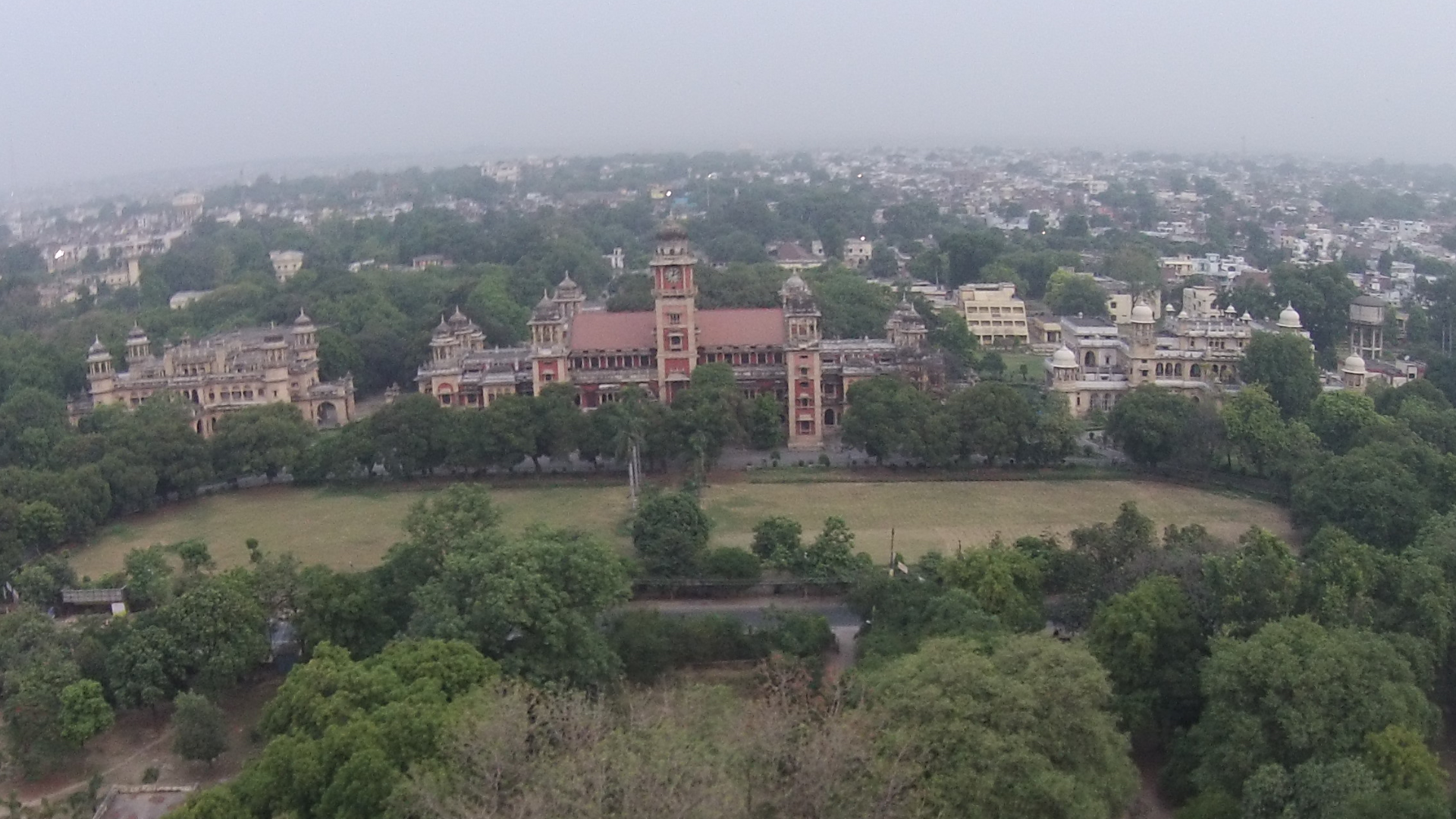
University of Allahabad - Aerial View

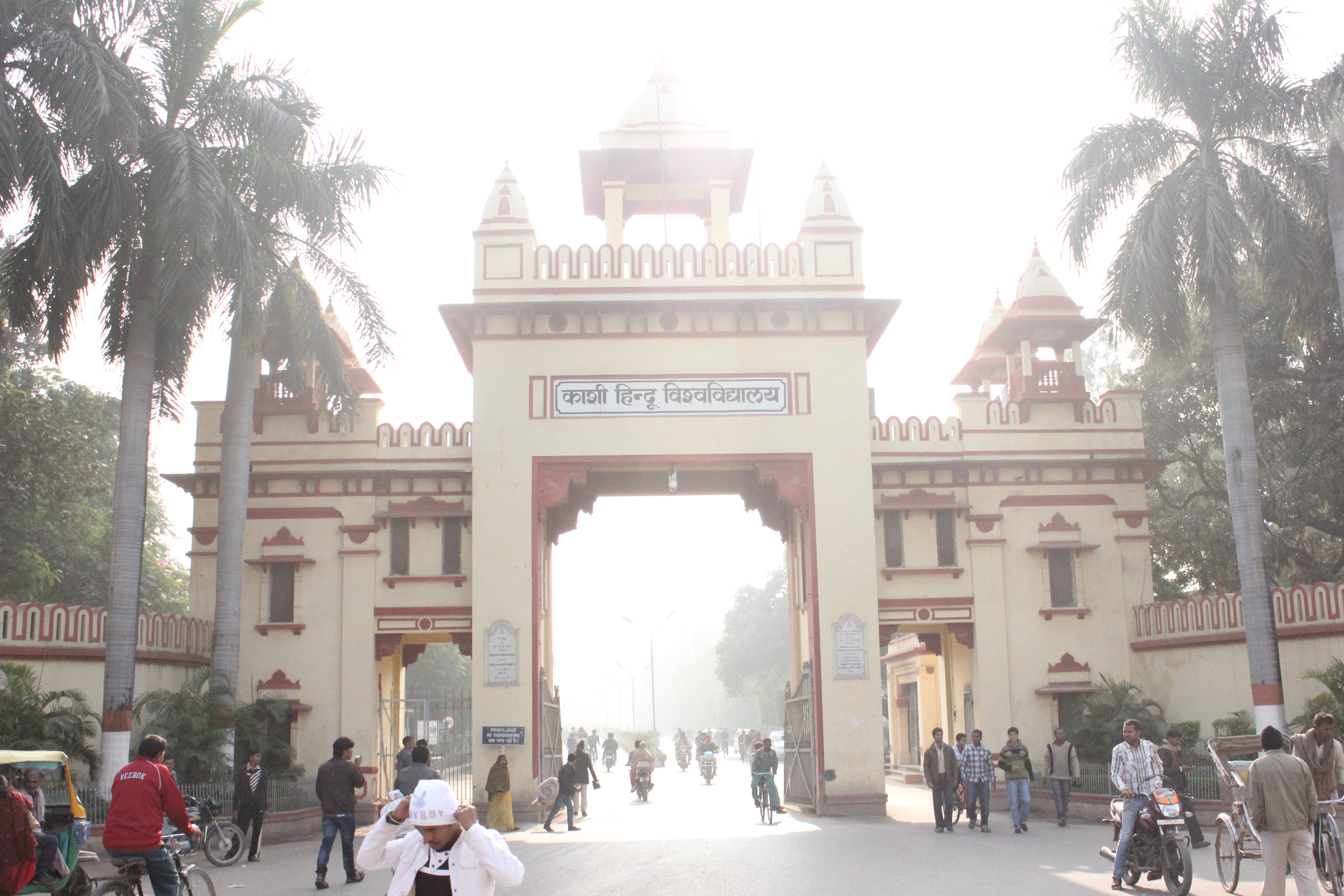
BHU - Main Gate

Ratan Shankar Mishra was born on 15 October 1918 at Ajgaon, a small hamlet in Unnao district in the Indian state of Uttar Pradesh in a Kanyakubja Brahmin family. Hi completed his schooling from the Government High School in Unnao in 1937 and did intermediate course at Kanyakubj Inter College, Lucknow after which he passed BSc with honours and MSc from Lucknow University. He continued his studies at Delhi University and secured a doctoral degree (PhD) in 1947, the first PhD awarded by the university in Mathematics. His Doctor of Science degree (DSc) came from Lucknow University in 1952, again the first DSc degree awarded by Lucknow University.

Mishra had already started his career while doing his doctoral research by joining the faculty of Mathematics at Ramjas College in 1944, later worked at Delhi College of Arts and Commerce and moved to Lucknow University where he worked till 1954. That year, he was appointed as the reader at the University of Delhi and stayed at the Indian capital till 1958. When Gorakhpur University invited him to head the department of Mathematics in 1958, he accepted the offer and shifted to the University of Allahabad to head the department of mathematics there. He was promoted as the dean in 1965 and in 1968, he joined Banares Hindu University as a selection grade professor and headed the maths and statistics department. In 1973, he became the Chief Proctor of the university and in 1975 became the dean to finally retire in 1978. After retirement, he worked as a visiting professor at Jammu University for a short term and took up the post of the vice chancellor of Lucknow University in 1982. In 1985, he resigned from the post to associate himself with Tensor, the University International Maths Journal, published from Japan. He also served as a visiting professor at University of Kuwait (1970, 1980–81, 1986), University of Windsor (1974) and the University of Waterloo (1967, 1972) and had associations with Kanpur University in academic matters.

Ratan Shankar Mishra died on 23 August 1999, at the age of 80.

== Legacy ==
Mishra specialised in differential geometry, relativity and fluid mechanics and his contributions to these fields have been documented. He was known to have elucidated the complete solutions to the unified field theory of Albert Einstein. He also added to the index-free notations and developed his own notations in differential geometry. He also wrote structures for Differentiable manifolds and Almost Contact Metric Manifolds.

Several academic and administrative reforms have been credited to Mishra during his tenure at the University of Allahabad. He guided several mathematicians for their PhD, DSc and DPhil research and introduced many new subjects such as Modern Algebra, Topology, Riemannian Geometry and Statistics & Probability into curriculum. Under his guidance, the university introduced a course in Abstract Algebra at the graduate level, the first time in India the subject was taught at the graduate level. He was also instrumental in conducting conferences and seminars, with financial assistance from the University Grants Commission where mathematicians from India and abroad like Jack P. Tull moderated the proceedings. It is also reported that the department of mathematics had the highest number of faculty members during his tenure as its head. Apart from several articles, he is the author of twelve text books and a report for Indian Science Congress Association published under the name, Progress of Mathematics - A decade (1963-1972).

== Positions ==
Mishra's efforts were behind the establishment of the Tensor Society of India, a mathematical society started in 1983, of which he was the founder president. He was associated with the Indian Science Congress Association for a number of years and served as a member of its executive council, as the sectional president in 1965, as the general secretary (1968-1971) and as the president in 1974. He served the National Academy of Sciences, India as its council member, as the president of the Physical Sciences section (1965-1966) and as its vice president (1969-1979). He was the president of the Indian Mathematical Society from 1982 to 1984 and a member of the executive council of the Indian National Science Academy from 1968 to 1970. He was a member of the board of directors of the United States Education Foundation in India and the nominating committee of the International Society on General Relativity and Gravitation. He served several government and semi government bodies and two award committees, Shanti Swarup Bhatnagar Prize for Science and Technology, the highest Indian award in science category and Magsaysay Award in their mathematical science research committee. He also chaired the All India panel for writing text books in mathematics and sat on the committee of National Council of Educational Research and Training (NCERT).

Mishra was also active in academic circles and held the presidency of the Gorakhpur University Teachers' Association in 1958 and was the hostel warden during his tenure there. While working for the Lucknow University, he was the president of the Teachers' Association (1975) and the Alumni Association. He was the president of the National Academy of Mathematics, Gorakhpur and was a founder member of the Society for Scientific Values. He was the editor in chief of Allhabad University journal, Progress of mathematics, editorial advisor of Forum of Mathematics journal and a member of the editorial boards of Research Journal in Science of Kanpur University and the Indian Journal of Pure and Applied Mathematics.

== Awards and honours ==
Ratan Shankar Mishra was an elected fellow of the Indian National Science Academy (INSA), Indian Academy of Sciences (IAS), National Academy of Sciences, India (NASI), International Academy of Physical Sciences and the Bihar Academy of Sciences. Banares Hindu University honoured him by selecting him as the Emeritus Professor of the university. Vaclav Hlavaty, the Czech-American mathematician bequeathed his unfinished problem on field equations to R. S. Mishra, by way of a note left on his death bed and Mishra completed the problem, text of which runs into about 100 pages.

He received the Banerjee Prize from Lucknow University in 1952 for the best research work. The Government of India awarded him the civilian honour of Padma Shri in 1971. Indian Mathematical Society placed the Distinguished Service Award on him in 1982 and the Jawaharlal Nehru Rashtriya Yuwa Kendra selected him for the Teachers' Day Award, Shikha Shiromani Alankaran in 1994. On 5 May 1995, Banares Hindu University honoured him as the chief guest of their Teachers' Day functions.

== See also ==
- Riemannian manifold
- Differential manifold
- Differential geometry
- Fluid mechanics
