= İsmail Hakkı (army officer) =

İsmail Hakkı Bey 1317-P. 59
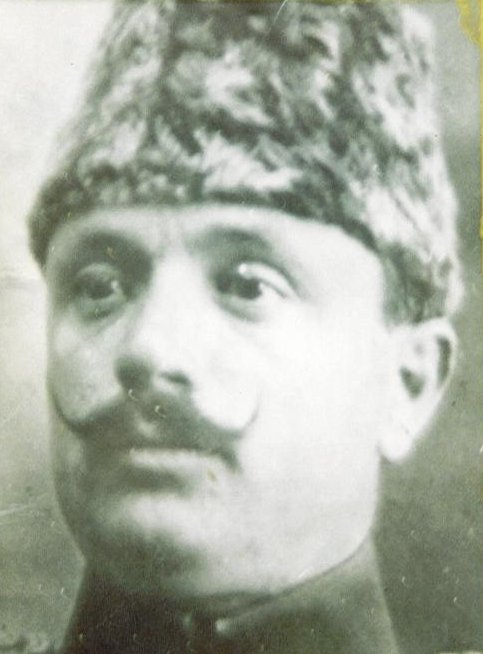
- Born: 1883; Istanbul (Constantinople), Ottoman Empire
- Died: 4 June 1923 (aged 39–40); Keşan
- Military career
- Allegiance: Ottoman Empire; Turkey
- Service years: Ottoman: 1902-October 30, 1918; Turkey: September 17, 1920-June 4, 1923
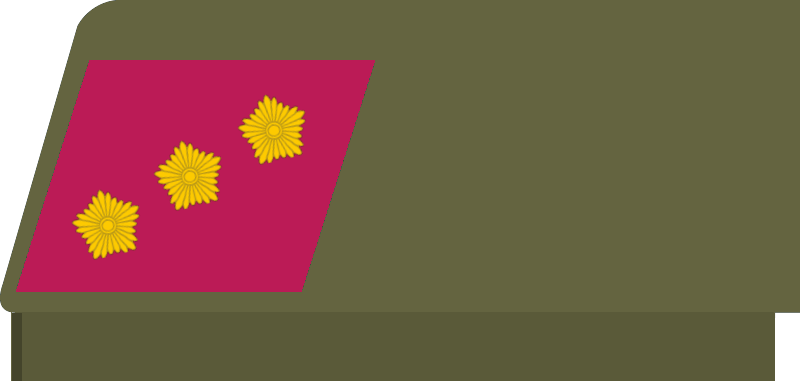
- Rank: Miralay
- Commands: 7th Regiment, 51st Division (deputy), 14th Division (deputy), 14th Division, "Tigris Group" (Dicle Grubu); 11th Caucasian Division, Kars Fortified Area Command, Inspector of the Thrace 4th Gendarmerie Area
- Conflicts: Italo-Turkish War; Balkan Wars; First World War; Turkish War of Independence

İsmail Hakkı Bey (1883, Constantinople (Istanbul) – June 4, 1923, Keşan) was an officer of the Ottoman Army and later the Turkish Army.

== Medals and decorations ==
- Order of Osminieh 3rd class with Sword
- Ottoman War Medal ("Gallipoli Star", Ottoman Empire)
- Silver Medal of Liyakat
- Silver Medal of Imtiyaz
- Prussia Iron Cross 1st and 2nd class
- Austria-Hungary Military Merit Medal (Austria-Hungary) 3rd class
- Medal of Independence with Red Ribbon

== See also ==
- List of high-ranking commanders of the Turkish War of Independence
- Battle of Sharqat
