= Jagdstaffel 83 =

Jasta 83
- Active: 1918
- Country: Kingdom of Prussia, German Empire
- Branch: Luftstreitkräfte
- Type: Fighter squadron
- Engagements: World War I

Royal Prussian Jagdstaffel 83, commonly abbreviated to Jasta 83, was a "hunting group" (i.e., fighter squadron) of the Luftstreitkräfte, the air arm of the Imperial German Army during World War I. Kampfeinsitzerstaffel 3, the predecessor to the squadron would score nine aerial victories during the war. Kest 3's victories came at the expense of two pilots killed in action and one wounded in action.

== History ==
Jasta 83 was one of the new squadrons authorized on 28 October 1918; it was founded in early November 1918. The new squadron was based on Kampfeinsitzerstaffel 3. Kest ("Scout Detachment") 3 was one of the original ad hoc German fighter detachments, founded on 14 July 1916. On 19 April 1917, Kest 3 was supporting Armee-Abteilung A. Kest 3 flew its first combat missions on 30 April 1917. It claimed its first victory on 23 May 1917.

== Commanding officers (Staffelführer) of Kest 3 ==
- Maxmilian Edler von Daniels: 11 August 1917 – 11 January 1918
- Georg Weiner: 11 January 1918 – 4 September 1918
- Unknown after 4 September 1918

== Duty station (as Kest 3) ==
- Morhange, France: 19 April 1917
