= Jagdstaffel 82 =

Jasta 82
- Active: 1918
- Country: Kingdom of Prussia, German Empire
- Branch: Luftstreitkräfte
- Type: Fighter squadron
- Engagements: World War I

Royal Prussian Jagdstaffel 82, commonly abbreviated to Jasta 82, was a "hunting group" (i.e., fighter squadron) of the Luftstreitkräfte, the air arm of the Imperial German Army during World War I. The squadron's predecessor, Kampfeinsitzerstaffel 2, would score six or more confirmed aerial victories.

== History ==
Jasta 82 was one of the new squadrons authorized on 28 October 1918. Founded in early November 1918, less than a fortnight before the Armistice, it was based on Kampfeinsitzerstaffel 2[ ("Scout Detachment") 2.]
