= Jagdstaffel 88 =

Jasta 88
- Active: 1918
- Country: Kingdom of Prussia, German Empire
- Branch: Luftstreitkräfte
- Type: Fighter squadron
- Engagements: World War I

Royal Prussian Jagdstaffel 88, commonly abbreviated to Jasta 88, was a "hunting group" (i.e., fighter squadron) of the Luftstreitkräfte, the air arm of the Imperial German Army during World War I.

== History ==
Jasta 88 was founded on 28 or 29 October 1918. Its predecessor was Kampfeinsitzerstaffel ("Scout Detachment") 8. The new squadron never became operational.
