= Mary Hannay Foott =

Australian poet and editor (1846–1918)

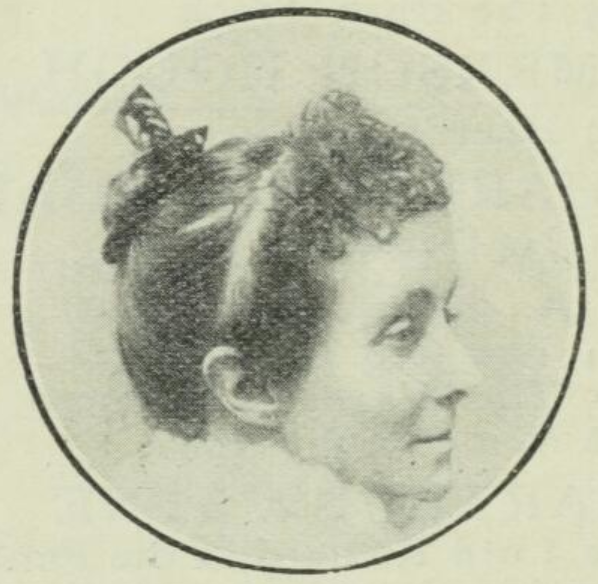
- Born: Mary Hannay Black; 26 September 1846; Glasgow, Scotland
- Died: 12 October 1918 (aged 72); Bundaberg, Queensland, Australia
- Relatives: Cecil Foott (son)

Mary Hannay Foott (26 September 1846 – 12 October 1918) was an Australian poet and editor. Born in Scotland in 1846, she moved to Australia with her family when she was 7. She trained as a teacher and worked at schools in Melbourne from her teenage years. Around 1869 she resigned from her teaching position and began training as an artist at the National Gallery School, supporting herself by publishing poetry and articles in newspapers. She married in 1874 and moved to a farming property in rural Queensland. After her husband's death in 1884, she moved to Brisbane and became the editor of the women's page for The Queenslander. She became a well-known writer of poetry, short stories, plays, and columns, some of which she published under the pseudonym "La Quenouille".

Foott is best known for her poem "Where the Pelican Builds", which was the title poem of her 1885 collection Where the Pelican Builds and Other Poems. The poem is a bush ballad about two horsemen who set out in search of land on which to settle and never return. She published a second poetry collection titled Morna Lee and Other Poems in 1890, as well as two plays.

== Life ==
Mary Hannay Foott was born in Glasgow, Scotland, on 26 September 1846. She was the eldest child of James Black and his wife Margaret (née Grant). The family migrated to Australia in 1853 and settled in the Melbourne suburb of Mordialloc. Mary attended a private school and then trained as a teacher at the National Model and Training School in 1861. She worked as a teacher at schools in Fitzroy and Brighton between 1862 and 1869, and then began training as an artist at the National Gallery School, where she was taught by Eugene von Guerard and Louis Buvelot. While studying at the National Gallery School she supported herself financially through the publication of her poetry and articles in newspapers, including The Melbourne Punch and The Australasian. After completing her studies at the National Gallery School, she briefly taught at a school in Wagga Wagga.

Mary married the Irish-born livestock inspector Thomas Wade Foott on 1 October 1874. They settled in the New South Wales town of Bourke and had a son named Cecil Henry, before moving to a 339-square-mile (880 km^{2}) station named Dundoo in south-west Queensland in 1877. At Dundoo Mary gave birth to her second son Arthur Patrick and wrote a number of poems about life in the Australian bush. The property began to suffer due to drought, forcing Foott and her husband to take out multiple mortgages. After her husband's death in 1884, Foott moved to Toowoomba and then to Rocklea. She began operating a boys' primary school and edited the women's page of the newspaper The Queenslander; she held the position at The Queenslander for about ten years, and also authored most of the content of the women's page. Foott wrote poetry, short stories, columns, and other features for the newspaper, sometimes under the pen name "La Quenouille" (transl. the distaff). In 1885 she published a poetry collection titled Where the Pelican Builds and Other Poems, which was reprinted in London in 1890, and in 1890 she published a second volume of poetry titled Morna Lee and Other Poems. She also wrote a comedy play titled More than Kin that was staged at Government House in 1891, and a play for children titled Sweep that was published by Gordon & Gotch the same year.

Foott returned to Melbourne around 1897 due to illness. During her recovery, she began teaching at a high school in Coburg, and then left Melbourne to take up a position as a teacher in Wagga Wagga. She moved to Townsville sometime before 1901 to live with her son Cecil, but soon returned to Rocklea to live with her younger son Arthur. Her poetry and fiction continued to appear in newspapers, including in The Queenslander. She moved to Bundaberg in 1912 with Arthur after he was hired by the Bundaberg Mail and may have worked as a governess or as a journalist for the newspaper. On 12 October 1918, she died from pneumonia in Bundaberg.

== Writing ==
Foott is best known for her bush ballad poem Where the Pelican Builds. The poem was first published in The Bulletin on 12 March 1881 and became the title poem of her 1885 collection Where the Pelican Builds and Other Poems. It recounts the story of women who wait several years for the return of two horsemen who set out in search of better land to the west and never return. It was based on the story of the Prout brothers, who disappeared in 1877 while searching for land on which to settle. The title of the poem compares the "pastures wide and green" that the men are searching for to a mythical place "sometimes spoken of by the bushmen of Western Queensland as the home of the pelican, a bird whose nesting place, so far as the writer knows, is seldom, if ever found". The poem has frequently appeared in anthologies, and is described by the literary scholar Chris Tiffin as one of the three best-known poems to be written in early Queensland. Susan Lever described it as among the most famous of the bush ballads and wrote that it has become "a recital piece for generations of children".

The literary scholar Patrick Buckridge writes that the intent of Foott's poetry was to situate elements of European culture in the Australian colonial landscape. Foott's writing often depicted the harshness of life in rural Queensland, inspired by her experiences on the Dundoo station. The scholar Elizabeth Webby notes, however, that while Foott is best known for her bush poetry, her writing was varied and also included sonnets, poems inspired by Biblical themes, and memorial poems.

== Selected works ==
=== Poetry collections ===
- Where the Pelican Builds and Other Poems, Gordon & Gotch, Brisbane, 1885
- Morna Lee and Other Poems, Gordon & Gotch, London and Brisbane, 2nd edition, 1890

=== Play ===
- More than Kin, 1891
- Sweep: A Comedy for Children in Three Acts, Gordon & Gotch, Brisbane, 1891

=== Notable poems ===
- "Where the Pelican Builds", The Australasian, 5 March 1881; reprinted in Where the Pelican Builds and Other Poems, Gordon and Gotch, 1885, p. 5
