= Jagdstaffel 90 =

Jasta 90
- Active: 1918
- Country: Kingdom of Prussia, German Empire
- Branch: Luftstreitkräfte
- Type: Fighter squadron
- Engagements: World War I

Royal Prussian Jagdstaffel 90, commonly abbreviated to Jasta 90, was a "hunting group" (i.e., fighter squadron) of the Luftstreitkräfte, the air arm of the Imperial German Army during World War I.

== History ==
Jasta 90 was founded on 28 or 29 October 1918. Its predecessor was Kampfeinsitzerstaffeln ("Scout Detachments") 1a and 1b. The new squadron never became operational.
