= Where the Pelican Builds and Other Poems =

Poetry collection by Mary Hannay Foott

- Author: Mary Hannay Foott
- Language: English
- Publisher: Gordon and Gotch
- Publication date: 1885
- Publication place: Australia
- Media type: Print (Hardback)
- Pages: 48

Where the Pelican Builds and Other Poems (1885) was the first, and only major, collection of poems by Australian poet Mary Hannay Foott. It was released in hardback by Gordon and Gotch publishers, Brisbane, in 1885. It features the poet's best-known work, "Where the Pelican Builds". The collection was republished in London in 1890 under the title Morna Lee and Other Poems, with several additional works.

The original collection includes 30 poems by the author that are reprinted from various sources.

== Contents ==
- "Where the Pelican Builds"
- "Up North"
- "In the Land of Dreams"
- "Happy Days"
- "In the South Pacific"
- "In Time of Drought"
- "The Aurora Australis"
- "Wentworth"
- "Nearing Port"
- "The Future of Australia"
- "Christmas Day"
- "The New Year"
- "Watch-Night"
- "The Belated Swallow"
- "No Message"
- "Charles Dickens"
- "Ave Caesar! Te Morituri Salutant!"
- "Napoleon III : 9th January, 1873"
- "To Henry the Fifth, Named King of France, A.D. 1873"
- "To the White Julienne"
- "In Memoriam : January, 1885"
- "The Massacre of the Bards"
- "David's Lament for Jonathan"
- "At the Fords of Jordan (The parting of King David and Barzillai the Gileadite after the revolt of Absolam)"
- The Magi to the Star
  - "Thanksgiving"
  - "Prayer"
  - "Farewell"
- "To the Virgin Mary"
- "The Melbourne International Exhibition"
- "The Australiad : An Epic for Young Australians"

== Critical reception ==
Writing in The Australasian soon after the book's publication a reviewer stated that the poems "Mrs Foott...has always had the great merit of giving us a faithful reflex of the actual life and nature existing before her eyes, and is one of those who have helped to make intelligible to dwellers in town the character and the visible aspects and the romantic and poetic associations of life in the far solicitudes of central Australia. And this quality of faithful realism of view in the first place, as a foundation for poetic treatment, is as apparent in these poems as in her bright and graphic prose."

A reviewer in The Queenslander found merit, of a kind: "As a rule our local writers are below mediocrity, and one is almost afraid to open a volume of poems when informed that it is the work of a local author, but in the case of Mrs. Foott matters are different, and it is pleasing, therefore, to welcome to the world of letters one who has undoubted claims to recognition as an Australian songstress. The poems are all of them comparatively short pieces — most of them dealing with Australian subjects — and throughout these latter runs a strong feeling of affection and admiration of the new country destined, if Mrs. Foott's aspirations are fulfilled, to become great and glorious. Though there is nothing excessively striking, all the pieces are meritorious to a certain extent, the phraseology exceedingly happy at times, and the versification and rhyming correct and pleasing."

== See also ==
- 1885 in poetry
- 1885 in Australian literature
