= Liberation of Serbia, Albania and Montenegro (1918) =

Military action in the Balkans in the final weeks of World War I

- Part of the Macedonian front of World War I
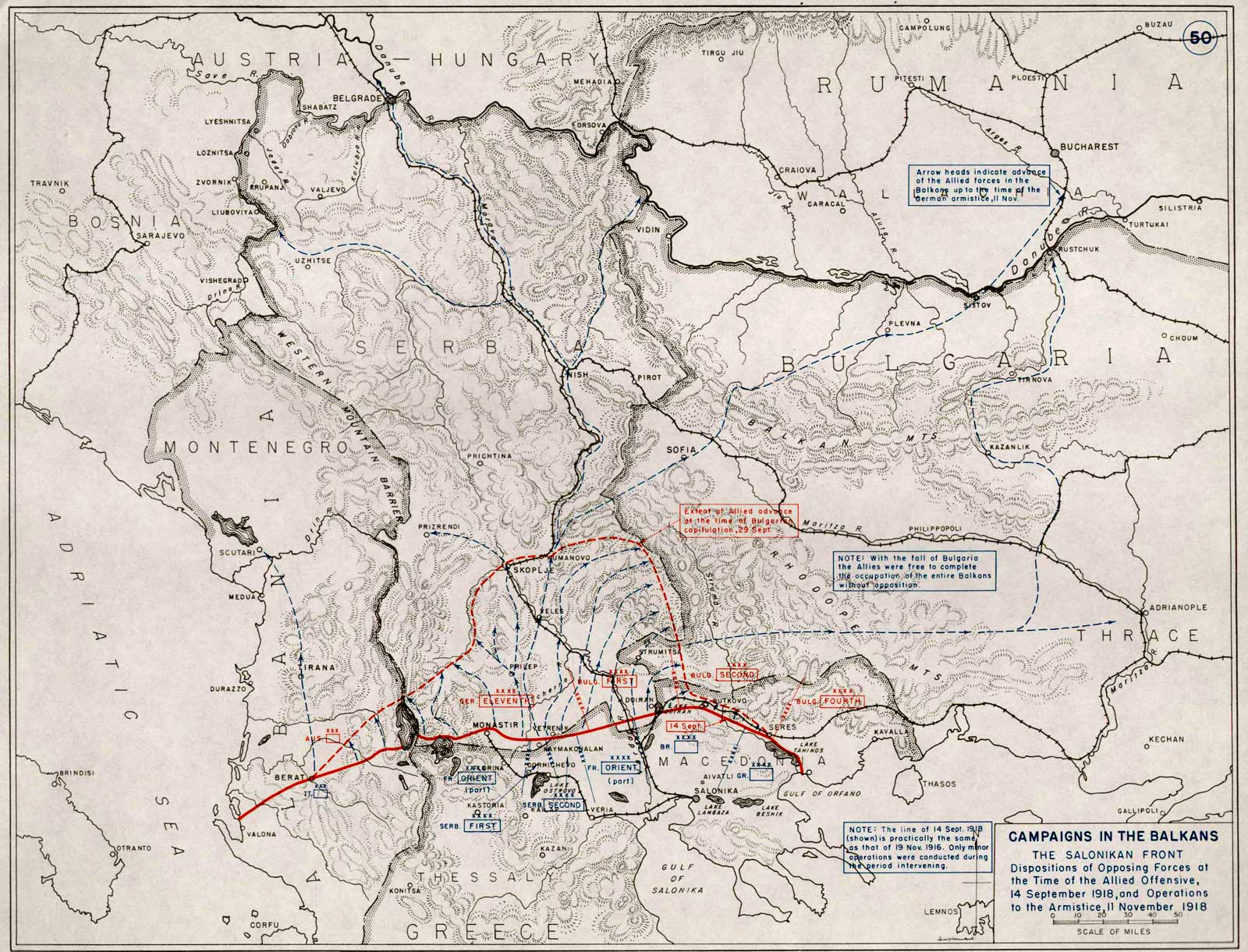
- Allied advance October–November 1918
Date	29 September – 11 November 1918
Location	Serbia, Albania and Montenegro
Result	Entente victory

Belligerents
Serbia; France; United Kingdom; Greece; Italy; Albania	Austria-Hungary; Bulgaria; Germany

The Liberation of Serbia, Albania and Montenegro was a military action in the Balkans in the final weeks of World War I. Between 29 September and 11 November 1918, the Allied Army of the Orient liberated these three countries from occupation by the Central Powers.

== Background ==
After remarkable defensive success against Austria-Hungary in 1914, Serbia was quickly defeated by combined Central Powers forces after Bulgaria declared war in October 1915. Remnants of the Royal Serbian Army retreated to the Italian-occupied Albanian ports of Durazzo and Valona where Entente naval forces performed a sea evacuation, initially mainly to the Greek Ionian island of Corfu. Also in October 1915, advance elements of a French and British expeditionary force arrived by sea at Salonika in Greek Macedonia. Thus neutral Greece found itself increasingly drawn into the war. Pursuing the retreating Serbs, the Central Powers also occupied Albania, while defeat of Montenegro followed in January 1916. The Central Powers thus occupied Serbia, Montenegro, and most of Albania including Durazzo, while the Entente retained Valona and occupied a portion of northern Greece, establishing the Macedonian front at Salonika to stimulate active Greek participation, to provide a place to redeploy and supply a re-organized and re-equipped Serbian army, and to fight the Central Powers in the Balkans.

Entente offensives on the Macedonian Front were ineffective until September 1918, when the Vardar offensive abruptly overcame Bulgarian and Central Powers defenses beginning with the Battle of Dobro Pole on 15 September. In late September, mutiny struck the Bulgarian army, whose will to fight was exhausted. Entente forces advanced quickly into Vardar Macedonia. On 29 September, Serbian and French forces liberated Skopje, then known as Uskub, as Bulgaria capitulated.

The Bulgarian armistice allowed the Entente unopposed access to Bulgarian railways and required Bulgaria to expel other Central Powers forces. This drove a decisive Central Powers collapse on all fronts and an unexpectedly quick end to the wider war. Greatly outnumbered and exposed, German and Austro-Hungarian forces in the Balkans, including the 11th Army in Serbia, the XIX Corps in Albania, and small units supporting Bulgaria, fled northward toward Hungary in defeat or forced withdrawal. With no Central Powers forces remaining between Greek and British forces and Constantinople, the Ottoman Empire concluded an armistice on 30 October. Liberation of Belgrade on 1 November, threatening almost unopposed Serbian and French invasion of Hungary, combined with domestic ethnic revolts and growing military mutiny, helped force Austria-Hungary to an armistice on 3 November. On 10 November, Romania repudiated the Treaty of Bucharest and re-entered the war. Alone and facing imminent, certain defeat, Germany agreed to armistice on 11 November.

== Liberation of Serbia, Albania and Montenegro ==
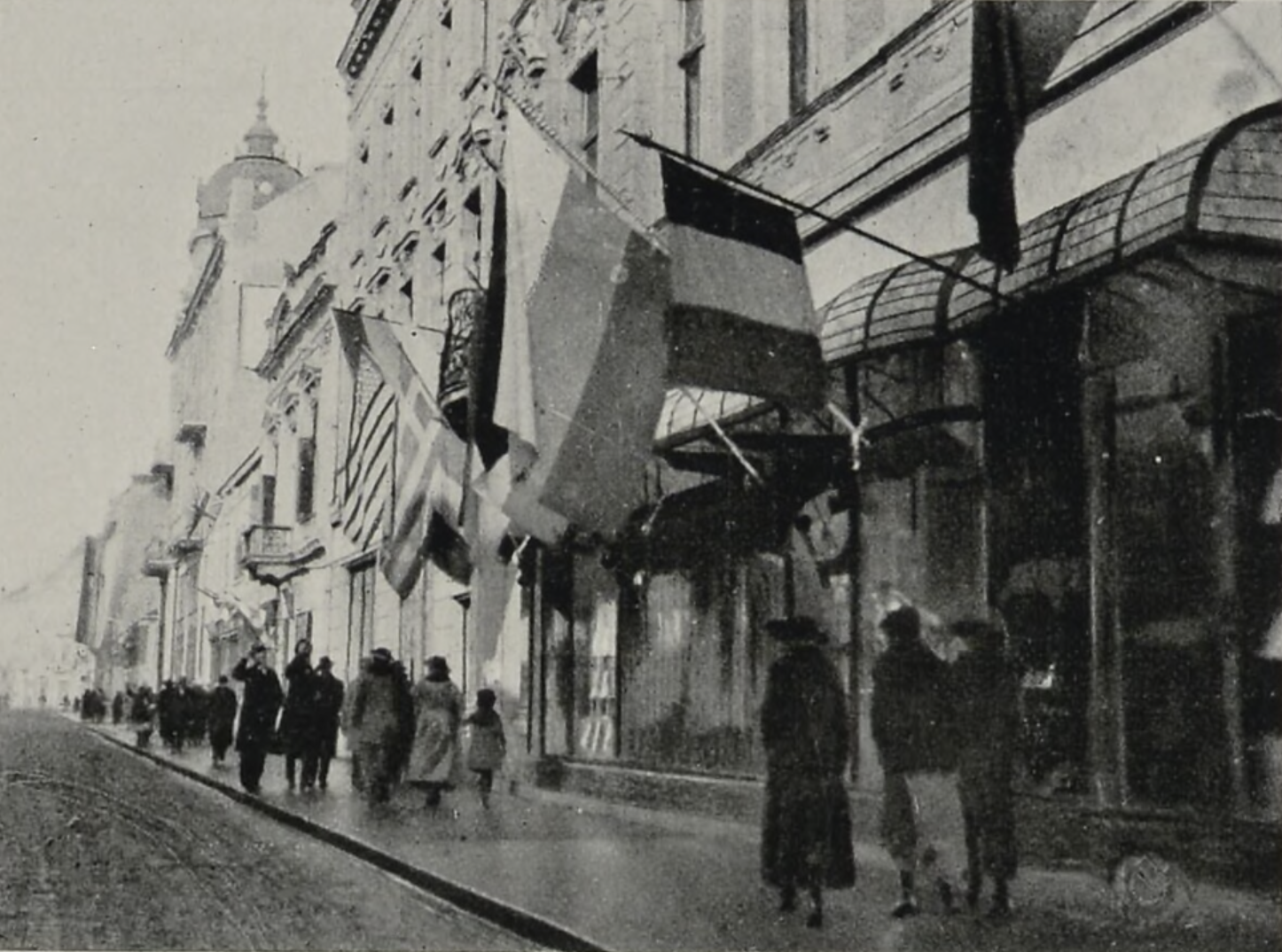
Allied flags in Belgrade after the liberation (Autumn 1918)

The Allied forces advanced in four directions.

In the center, the 1st Serbian Army under Petar Bojović and part of the French Armée d'Orient under Paul Prosper Henrys advanced north. German forces failed to regroup and block this advance at Niš. Vranje was liberated on 5 October, Niš on 11 October and Belgrade on 1 November. Here, the Serbian Army halted, as the State of Slovenes, Croats and Serbs, was proclaimed on 29 October 1918 amid the imminent collapse of Austria-Hungary.

The 2nd Serbian Army under Stepa Stepanović, with French forces, advanced northwest towards Kosovo. Pristina was liberated by the 11th French Colonial Division on 10 October, and Peć on 17 October. By 3 November, the border with Bosnia and Hercegovina was reached.

Colonel Dragutin Milutinović led a Serbian force, the "Scutari Troops" (later "Adriatic Troops"), northwest through Albania aiming to liberate Montenegro. This force arrived in Podgorica on 31 October to find Montenegro already liberated by local paramilitary forces. After a last skirmish, the Austro-Hungarian occupation force evacuated Montenegro on 4 November.

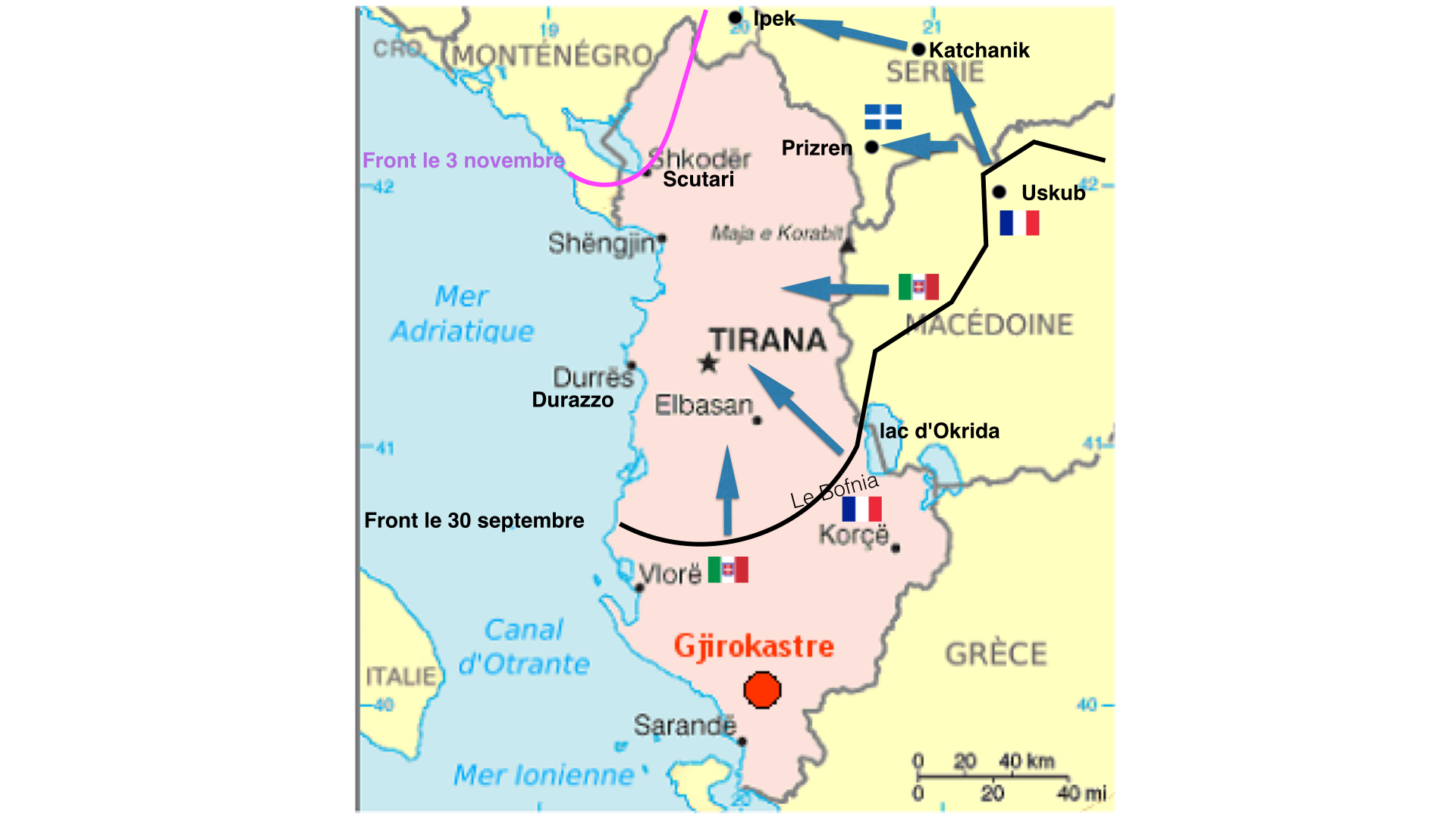
Liberation of Albania (1918)

In Albania, the Austro-Hungarian XIX Corps under Karl von Pflanzer-Baltin withdrew by land to avoid encirclement. The Entente had firm control of the Adriatic Sea, as shown by the Allied bombing of Durrës on 2 October. The Italian 16th Army corps (CSIO) and the French 57th division advanced northward, liberating Berat on 1 October, Durrës on 16 October, and Shkodër on 30 October. From the east the French 11th Colonial Division, 30th Division, Italian 35th Division and Greek 3rd and 4th Divisions entered Albania, liberating Elbasan on 8 October. Having reached Kotor, Austro-Hungarian forces surrendered on 3 November.

== Actions in Bulgaria, Romania and Turkey ==
After the capitulation of Bulgaria, three French, one Greek and one British division, the 26th, together called the Army of the Danube under the command of Henri Mathias Berthelot, travelled unopposed under armistice terms through Bulgaria by rail towards Romania. By the end of October, they had reached Ruse, Pleven and Veliko Tarnovo. Their advance motivated Romania to reenter the war on 10 November, as this army crossed the Danube at Svishtov, Giurgiu and Nikopol.

When the Bulgarians exited the war, there were no Central Powers forces left to block an Entente advance to Istanbul. Entente forces reached Makri, 30 km from the Turkish border, on 28 October. The Ottoman Empire capitulated two days later.

== Aftermath ==
With the collapse of Bulgaria, Turkey and Austria-Hungary, rivalries among Entente allies emerged. Italy and Serbia clashed over influence in Albania and over the Adriatic Question. In Montenegro a civil war erupted between supporters of confederation with Serbia supported by Italy (Greens) and supporters of a full union with Serbia (Whites). Serbia and Romania disputed the Banat region, which led France to deploy peacekeepers to Banat until borders were fixed on 10 September 1919 in the Treaty of Saint-Germain-en-Laye.

== See also ==
- Creation of Yugoslavia
- Macedonian front (1915–1918)
- Adriatic Question (1918–1920)
- Christmas uprising in Montenegro (January 1919 – 1929)
- Union of Transylvania with Romania (December 1918)
- Hungarian–Romanian War (1918–1920)
- Italian protectorate over Albania (1917–1920)
- Vlora War (1920)
- Invasion of Serbia by Bulgaria during the First World War
