= Ajgaon =

- village
- Location in Maharashtra, India Ajgaon (India)
- Country: India
- State: Maharashtra
- District: Sindhudurg
- Talukas: Sindhudurg

Government
  - Body: Village Panchayat

Languages
  - Official: Marathi
- Time zone: UTC+5:30 (IST)
- Civic agency: Village Panchayat

Ajgaon is a village in the state of Maharashtra, India. It is located in the Sawantwadi taluk of Sindhudurg district in Maharashtra.

Ajgaon lies about 13 km south of Vengurla, in Sindhudurg District. It is the last major settlement along the highway before the road enters North Goa District of Goa. Arambol is the nearest village on the other side of the border. Sawantwadi is 43 km north-east of Ajgaon Shri Vetaleshwar Temple at Ajgaon

Parshuram Temple – Aajgaon, Sawantwadi Konkan is also known as Land of Lord Parshuram. One temple of Lord Parshuram is situated at Sindhudurg district (in Sawantwadi Taluka) in Ajgaon village and the other temple is at Chiplun in Ratnagiri district.
