= Jaroslav Hašek =

Czech humorist, satirist, writer and anarchist (1883–1923)

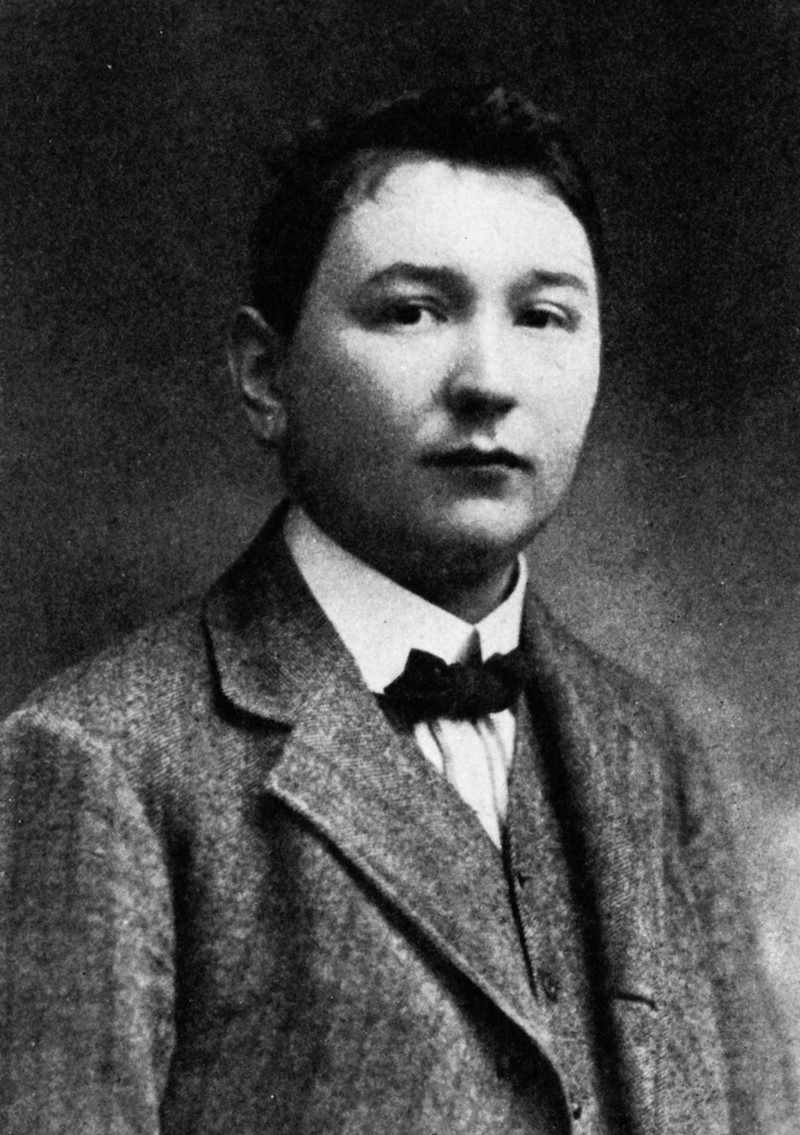
- Born: 30 April 1883; Prague, Austria-Hungary
- Died: 3 January 1923 (aged 39); Lipnice nad Sázavou, Czechoslovakia
- Occupations: Novelist, humorist
- Writing career
- Language: Czech; Russian
- Genre: Historical satire
- Notable work: The Good Soldier Švejk
- Movement: Social realism

Jaroslav Hašek (Czech: [ˈjaroslaf ˈɦaʃɛk]; 30 April 1883 – 3 January 1923) was a Austria-Hungary-Czechoslovak writer, humorist, satirist, journalist, bohemian, first anarchist and then communist, and commissar of the Red Army against the Czechoslovak Legion. He is best known for his novel The Fateful Adventures of the Good Soldier Švejk During the World War, an unfinished novel about a soldier in World War I and a satire on the ineptitude of authority figures. The novel has been translated into about 60 languages, making it the most translated novel in Czech literature.

== Life ==
Jaroslav Hašek's paternal ancestors were farmers rooted in Mydlovary in South Bohemia. Hašek's grandfather from his father's side, František Hašek, was a member of the Czech Landtag and later also the so-called Kromeriz convention. He was also involved in barricade fights in Prague in 1848. According to some rumors, he worked with Mikhail Bakunin during his stay in Bohemia in 1849.

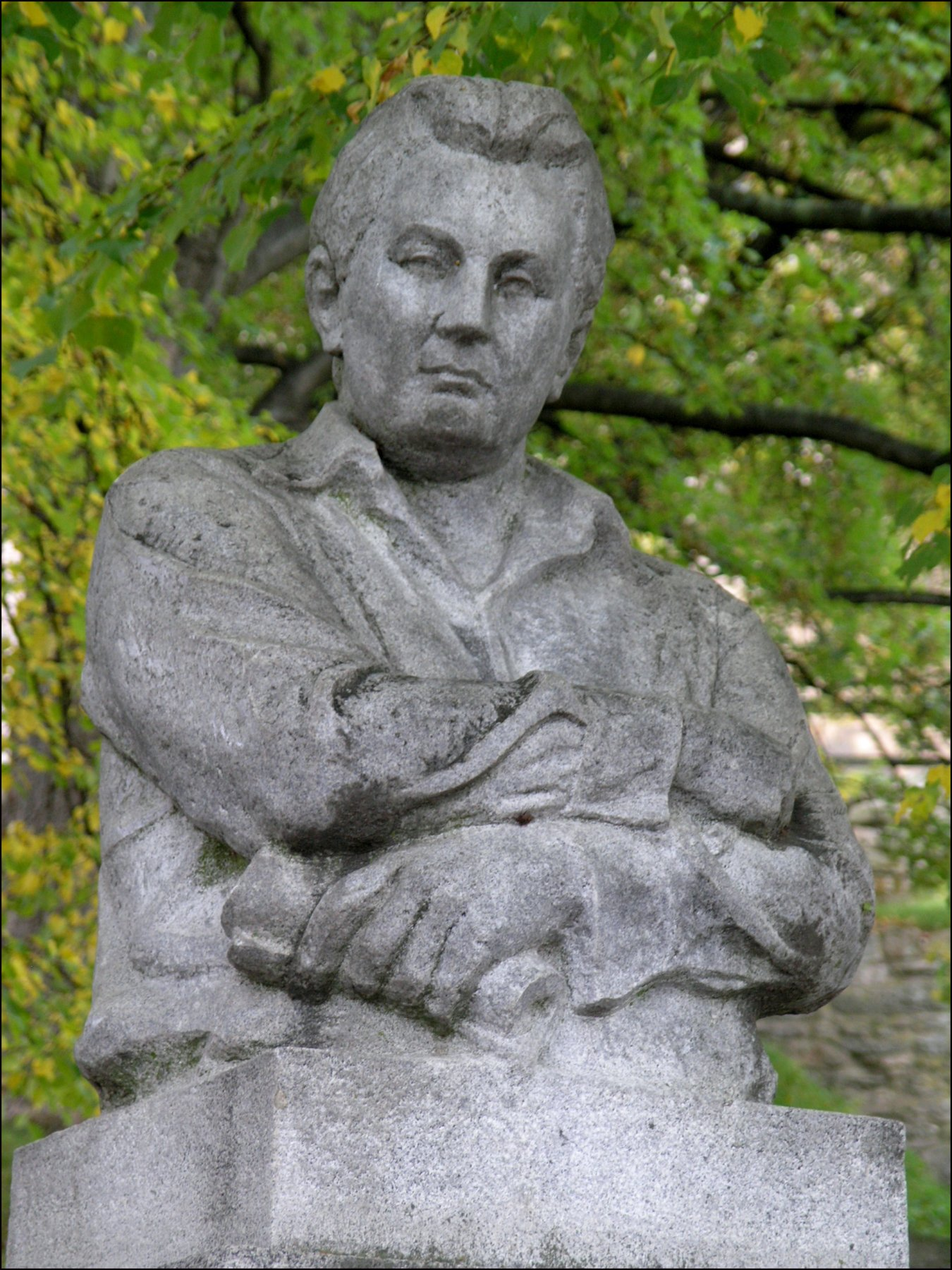
Monument to Jaroslav Hašek in Lipnice nad Sázavou

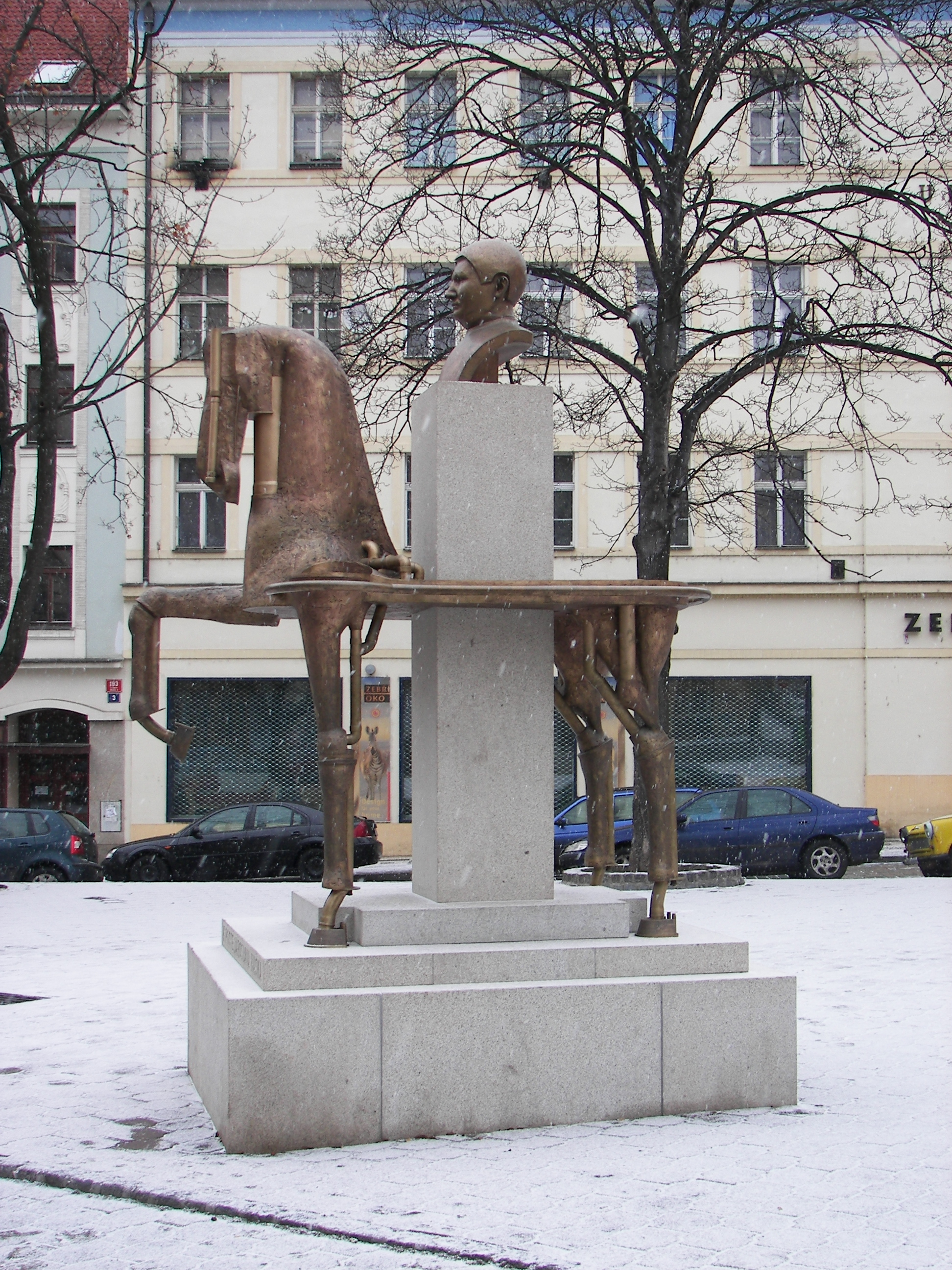
Statue of Jaroslav Hašek in Žižkov, near the pubs where he wrote some of his works

The family of his mother, Katherine, née Jarešová, was also from South Bohemia. His grandfather Antonín Jareš and his great-grandfather Matěj Jareš were pond-keepers of the Schwarzenberg princes in Krč village No. 32.

His father, Josef Hašek, a deeply religious mathematics teacher, died early of alcohol intoxication. He put an end to himself due to pain caused by cancer. Poverty then forced his mother Kateřina with three children to move more than fifteen times.

At the age of four, the doctor diagnosed a heart defect and "stunted thyroid gland" in little Jaroslav. Because of this, he spent a lot of time in the country, with his grandfather from his mother's side, in the so-called Ražice dam-house, especially with his younger brother Bohuslav. In his childhood, Jaroslav was jealous of Bohuslav and even tried several times to hurt him as a baby. Later they had an extremely strong relationship and traveled together a lot on foot. Bohuslav drank himself to death one year after Jaroslav's death.

Hašek's childhood was ordinary, boyish, imbued with adventures with peers and reading Karl May and Jules Verne. However, this changed when Hašek was eleven: the retired sailor Němeček moved to Lipová Street, where the Hašeks lived at that time. Němeček wrapped the teenage Hašek around his little finger, pilfered the money that Hašek had stolen at home, and began to lead him into bars, including the infamous Jedová chýše (Poison Hut) on Apolinářská Street, where he taught him to drink alcohol. In addition, he intentionally had sex with his girlfriend in front of the boy. It was traumatic for Hašek. He later remembered these experiences with disgust and remorse. It probably influenced Hašek's relationship with women. In his discussions with his comrades in the Russian legions, it is said that he said the following about women:

"Can there be anything worse in the world than such a human pig? I didn't know anything about these things, and yet I felt such disgust and revulsion that it was enough to poison my whole life. I could never look at the woman again, and I have also been afraid of women since then."

Some theories about Hašek's homosexuality, spread mainly by the literary historian Jindřich Chalupecký (the essay "Podivný Hašek" in the book Expresionisté), have also originated here, as well as in the testimony of Hašek's friend Rudolf Šimanovský.

Shortly after Hašek began his studies at the grammar school in Ječná Street, his father died. In 1897, he was present at anti-German riots in Prague as a student. He was arrested and the gymnasium teachers forced him to "voluntarily" leave the institution. He then trained as a druggist in Kokoška's drugstore on the corner of Perštýn and Martinská Street, but eventually graduated from the Czech-Slavonic Business Academy in Resslova Street. At the academy, he made friends with Ladislav Hájek, and in 1903 they together wrote and released a parody of the lyrical poetry of May Shouts, in which Hašek first laughed at pathos and entered the field of humorous literature.

After graduating in 1902, he was employed by the Slavia Bank; however, he was dismissed on May 28, 1903, for being absent without permission.

Thereafter, he began to earn his living exclusively in journalism and literature. At that time, he also met Czech anarchists. He began to lead a bohemian and vagrant life. Together with his brother Bohuslav, he walked through, among other places, Slovakia and western Galicia (now in Poland). Jaroslav Hašek published stories from these trips in Národní listy.

In 1907, he became editor of the anarchist magazine Komuna and was briefly imprisoned for his work.

In the same year, he fell in love with Jarmila Mayerová but, because of his bohemian life, her parents did not consider him a suitable partner for their daughter. When he was arrested for desecrating the Austro-Hungarian flag in Prague, Mayerová's parents took her to the countryside in the hope that it would help end their relationship. In response, Hašek tried to back out of his radical politics and get permanent work as a writer. In 1908 he edited the Women's Horizon. In 1909 he had sixty-four published short stories.

In February 1909, he was appointed editor of Svět zvířat (Animal World), a popular biweekly magazine that focused on animals and animal breeding. Hašek's engagement with the magazine was only the second time in his life that he had been permanently employed, and now he kept the job longer than he had at Banka Slavia, probably around 20 months.

Obtaining permanent employment at Animal World was instrumental in overcoming Jarmila Mayerová's parents' resistance to her marrying Hašek, and the wedding took place on 23 May 1910. In October 1910, Hašek was dismissed as editor of Animal World "when it was discovered he'd written articles about non-existent animals he'd made up". In November, he and his wife set up a dog trading business named "Cynological Institute of Prague", which failed after a few months. After a year of marriage, Jarmila returned to her parents after Hašek was detained for trying to feign his own death. According to other sources, however, this was a serious attempt at suicide, motivated by the understanding that he was unable to live a marital life. After this attempt, he was briefly hospitalized in a psychiatric hospital.

From 1911, he contributed to the Czech Word, then to the Torch, Humorist Letters, Nettle, Cartoons, and for some time led the Institute of Cynology, which inspired his later book My Dog Shop.

In 1911, he founded The Party of Moderate Progress Within the Bounds of the Law. He founded it with his friends in the Vinohrady pub called U zlatého litru (The Golden Liter) to parody the political life of that time. He also wrote the satirical work Political and Social History of the Party of Mild Progress within the limits of the law, but it was not published in book form until 1963.

During this period, together with František Langer, Emil Artur Longen and Egon Erwin Kisch he co-authored a number of cabaret performances, where he was also the main performer.

In the summer of 1912, Hašek spent several weeks in a pub in Chotěboř, where he could not be gotten rid of and the proprietors waited in vain for payment. He described his stay in Chotěboř in the stories "Traitor of the Nation in Chotěboř", the "District Court in Malibor", and "How about the birthplace of Ignát Herrmann or the Consecration in Krivice".

At the outbreak of the First World War, Hašek lived with the cartoonist Josef Lada, who later illustrated the Good Soldier Švejk.

In February 1915, Hašek was called up to the replacement battalion of the 91st Infantry Regiment of the Austro-Hungarian Army in České Budějovice. With the Regiment's 12th March Battalion, he was in early July transported to the Eastern front in Galicia (now Ukraine). He served on the front until 24 September 1915 when he was captured by the Russians and sent to the Totskoye camp in Orenburg Governorate. Here he joined the Czechoslovak Legion in 1916. Then he was drafted into the 1st Regiment, where he worked as a scribe, emissary of the recruitment committee and gunner. Then he was transferred to the connecting section, machine-gun section (in which he participated in the Battle of Zborov against the Austrians) and the office of the 1st Regiment. From July 1916 to February 1918 he published in the journal Čechoslovan and Cs. soldier, and was the author of a number of anti-Bolshevik articles.

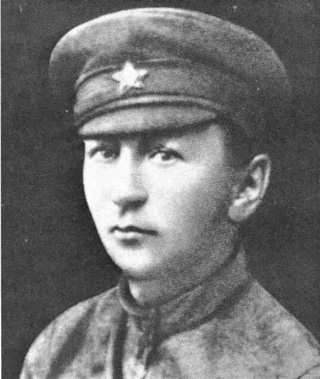
Jaroslav Hašek in 1920.

At the end of February 1918, he joined the Czechoslovak Social Democratic Workers' Party (forerunner of the Communist Party of Czechoslovakia, 1921–1992). What led Hašek to abandon anarchism and to accept socialist ideals has nowhere been clarified. In March, the Czechoslovak legions embarked on their well-known retreat, with the aim of joining the Western Front via Vladivostok. Hašek disagreed with this and went to Moscow, where he began to cooperate with the Bolsheviks. In April he transferred from the legions to the Red Army. He was sent to Samara and the following year he was director of the army printer in Ufa, chief of the department for work with foreigners, etc. At the end of 1918 he served as commander of the Chuvash troops in the Red Army and as deputy military commander of the Bugulma district. He then worked in Siberia, where he published several magazines. One of them was also the first magazine in the Buryat language, Jur (Dawn).

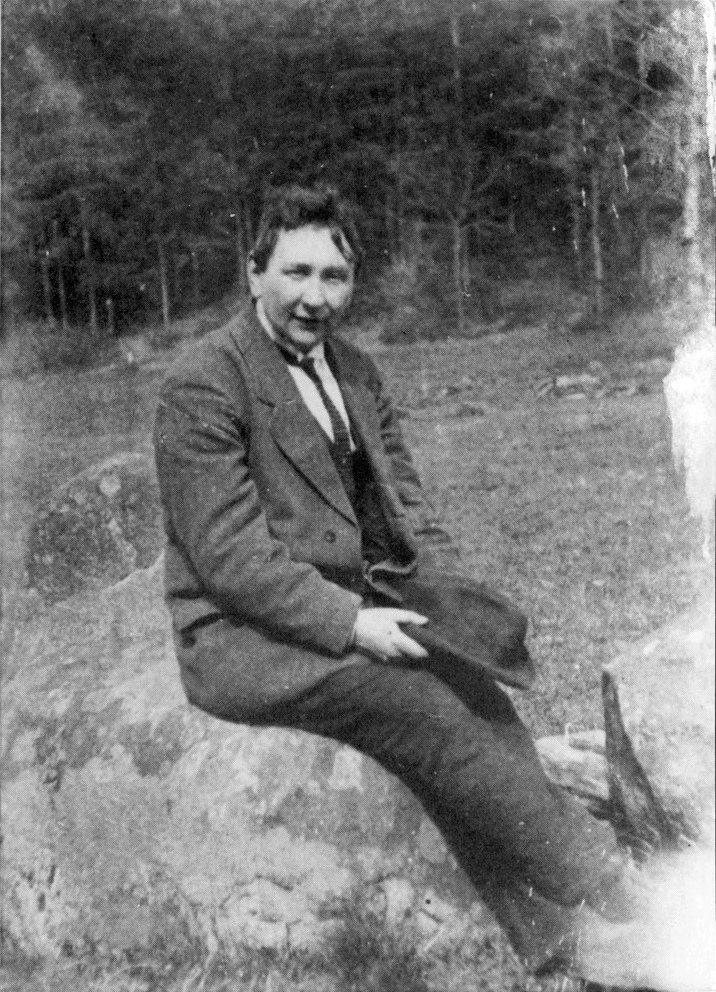
Jaroslav Hašek in 1921

In 1920, he was wounded in an assassination attempt in Irkutsk, where he served as a member of the city soviet. In the same year he fell ill with typhoid fever, and in May he married a printing worker named Alexandra Grigorievna Lvova, called Shura, who took care of him after his illness. After his return to Czechoslovakia, he was not tried for polygamy because of the lack of order and recognition of various international treaties in Russia.

In December 1920, Hašek returned to independent Czechoslovakia. He was initially placed in quarantine in Pardubice, and on 19 December he arrived in Prague with Shura. The Soviets had sent him to Czechoslovakia to organize the communist movement. However, he was prevented from doing so by two circumstances: on the one hand, in support of the Kladno riots, he received from the Russian authorities an amount of 1,500 marks, which, however, was completely devalued by German inflation. In addition, even before Hašek's arrival in Prague, Jaroslav Handlíř, leader of a clutch of Russian agents whom Hašek was to contact, was arrested in Czechoslovakia. In this way Hašek's interest in communist politics ended and he returned to his bohemian way of life. He visited pubs in Prague and its surroundings, where he wrote his stories. Many stories describing this period were written by Hašek's friend Zdeněk Matěj Kuděj.

On 25 August 1921 Hašek left with his wife Shura and painter Jaroslav Panuška for Lipnice nad Sázavou. By this time he was seriously ill and dangerously obese. In Lipnice he began writing his masterpiece, The Fate of the Good Soldier Švejk During the World War. Eventually he was unable to write, yet he continued to dictate Švejk's chapters in his bedroom. On 3 January 1923, he died of heart disease. The last known photograph was taken in December 1922.

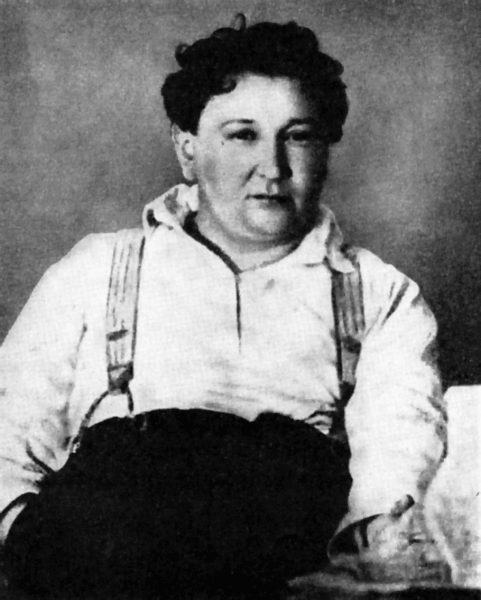
Hašek in October 1922

== Contradictions and points of interest ==
In the Czech and Slovak public imagination Jaroslav Hašek is fixed as a bohemian, perhaps even the prototypical bohemian of the early twentieth century. In fact, this is largely a legend and represents Hašek's self-stylization. An internally disciplined author, Hašek was very productive. From his works it is also apparent that he had an extensive (perhaps a little unsystematic) humanistic education.

It is most instructive to consider Hašek's work in Russia during 1916 to 1920. He has never been and still is not perceived as a mere bohemian or humorist writer in Russia, but, on the contrary, as a very responsible Bolshevik army official and a respected intellectual. He was also a relatively skilled soldier. In 1918 he distinguished himself as a courageous commander of the Czechoslovak Red Army troops in the defense of Samara. Samara was at that time threatened from the direction of Lipyagi station by the Czechoslovak legions, which were fighting alongside the White troops to restore the imperial regime, although the legionnaires tried to maintain essential neutrality and fight against the Bolsheviks only when inevitable. On 8 June 1918, Samara was conquered by the legions. It is possible that at this time, Jaroslav Hašek met with Czech "brothers" and may have encouraged them to leave the White-Russian party. After the fall of Samara, he was in hiding in a territory controlled by White troops (and Czechoslovak legions) for several months.

It is possible that in specific revolutionary Russian conditions, Hašek was given the opportunity to assert those aspects of his character that could not manifest themselves in stabilized and essentially small-town Czech conditions. It was also important that Hašek was banned by his Party organization from drinking alcohol. He was basically sent to Czechoslovakia with the aim of organizing the communist movement, which also supports the thesis that he had to be perceived as a responsible person and a capable organizer in Soviet Russia.

A subject of debate and speculation is how Hašek behaved in the Red Army, especially at a time when he was a Commissioner – and deputy commander – of Bugulma.

Hašek had close contact with a number of revolutionaries including Leon Trotsky. Hašek's closest collaborators in Russia – Nikolai Ivanovich Kochkurov ("Artem Vesely") or Vladimir Yakovlevich Zazubrin – later became victims of Stalin's repression.

There is also speculation about Hašek's mysterious mission to Mongolia, which he probably undertook in Soviet service. The writer Pavel Gan claims that he was there in conjunction with the Chinese revolutionary Chen Chang-Hai, alias Vanya Chang, and was going to go with him to China, for which reason he probably learned solid Chinese.

A not-well-known aspect of Hašek's biography is that after returning to his homeland he found himself somewhat isolated. He was uncomfortable from left to right. After he left communist politics, for example, Stanislav Kostka Neumann described him as a "traitor to the proletarian revolution." For the poet Karel Toman he was branded a "traitor of the nation" by his red arm band and refused to shake his hand when he met him in a café after the war. There were more such hostile reactions. Hašek's departure to Lipnice, where he wrote Švejk, was motivated by the hostile atmosphere he met in Prague.

== Works ==
Initially Hašek wrote mainly travel stories, features and humoresques, which he published in magazines. He wrote most of his works in Prague pubs.

His prose was based on his own real experiences, confusing investigation of his actual life, because it is not always clear what is true and what is only poetic hyperbole.

Hašek hated pretense, sentimentality, settled life, to which he ironically reacted in satiric verse. Another characteristic feature of his work is resistance to moral and literary conventions.

In his life, he wrote about 1,200 short stories. Most of his short prose is scattered throughout various magazines and newspapers. Over the years nearly all the stories have been collected and printed in book's form. Some texts may however have been lost, for example, the story "The History of the Ox." There is also a number of texts of which Hašek's authorship is likely, but not confirmed.

Words flowed easily from his pen, but this does not mean that he was not creative. František Langer stated that "he was attracted, controlled, absorbed by writing, driven by his almost passionate passion for his writing."

His most famous text by far, the four-part humorous novel The Fate of the Good Soldier Švejk During the World War, has been translated into 58 languages and several times filmed and dramatized. Individual parts of the novel have the names: "In the Background (1921)", "At the Front (1922)", "Famous Spanking (1922)" and "Unfinished Continuation of the Famous Spanking" (1923). Hašek's most important work is associated by many people with congenial illustrations by Josef Lada. Hašek did not manage to complete the book. The completion of the work by Karel Vaněk is far from Hašek's original conception. Vanek's completion was based on the continuation of 1921, but was highly criticized (Viktor Dyk, Jaroslav Durych, F. X. Šalda etc.). At first, the work had few followers. Ivan Olbracht was probably the first to mark it as a major work in the cultural section of Rudé právo. "It is one of the best books ever written in the Czech Republic, and Svejk is quite a new type in world literature, equivalent to Don Quixote, Hamlet, Faust, Oblomov, Karamazov," Olbracht wrote. Karel Čapek, Josef Čapek, Julius Fučík and Vítězslav Nezval, who connected Hašek's work with Dadaism, also adopted a positive attitude, as did Devětsil theoretician Bedřich Václavek. Discussions on the value of the work continued in later years. For example, Václav Černý opposed Švejk, but a wide range of Czech literary theorists, artists, and intellectuals had other views – the philosopher Karel Kosík saw the novel as "an expression of the absurdity of the alienated world"; he described Švejk as the "tragic bard of European nihilism. The aesthetist Jan Grossman associated Švejk with existentialism; the literary theorist Jindřich Chalupecký described Švejk as the "tragic bard of European nihilism,"; and the writer Milan Kundera described the novel as "the pure irrationality of history.".

Švejk has been dramatized several times, Hašek himself performed the first dramatization for the Emil Artur Longen "Revolutionary Scene"; in 1928 Švejk turned into a theater performance of Hašek's friend Max Brod, in 1963 by Pavel Kohout. The international adaptation was achieved by the adaptation of Schweik in the Second World War by the German playwright and director Bertold Brecht.

== Tributes ==
On 30 April 2013, Google celebrated Jaroslav Hasek's 130th Birthday with a doodle.

== See also ==
- Vlastimil Košvanec
- Josef Lada
- Cecil Parrott
- Statue of Jaroslav Hašek
