= Troyanov =

Troyanov is a surname. Notable people with the surname include:

- Ilija Trojanow (born 1965), also transliterated "Ilya Troyanov," Bulgarian–German writer, translator, and publisher
- Konstantin Troyanov (born 1995), Russian football player
- Vyacheslav Troyanov, (1875–1918), Russian general
