= Battle of Lipyagi =

1918 battle of the Russian Civil War

- Part of the Russian Civil War
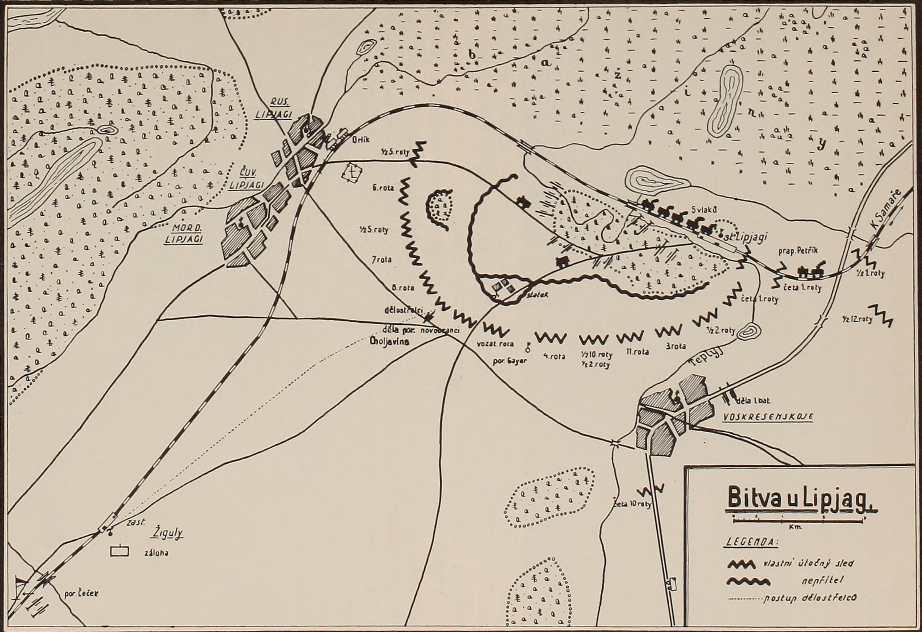
- Battle plan
Date	4 June 1918
Location	Lipyagi, Volga region
Result	Decisive Czechoslovak victory

Belligerents
(Bohemia) Czechoslovak Legion	Russian SFSR

Commanders and leaders
(Bohemia) Stanislav Čeček	(Russian Soviet Federative Socialist Republic) Mikhail Kadomtsev †

Strength
1,600 men	4,000 men

Casualties and losses
30 killed and 89 wounded	1,800 killed (including 300 drowned in swamps) and 2,000 captured

The Battle of Lipyagi took place on 4 June 1918 at the Lipyagi railway station in the Volga region. Units of the Czechoslovak legion led by Stanislav Čeček defeated Bolshevik troops which opened their way to rest of the Czechoslovak troops. Legionnaires met with rest of Legion in on 6 July 1918 near Minyar and finally indirectly in the eastern part at the Olovjanaya station. By blocking the Trans-Siberian highway of Czechoslovak legionnaires completely stopped the transport of German and Austro-Hungarian prisoners to the Western and Italian front.

== Battle ==
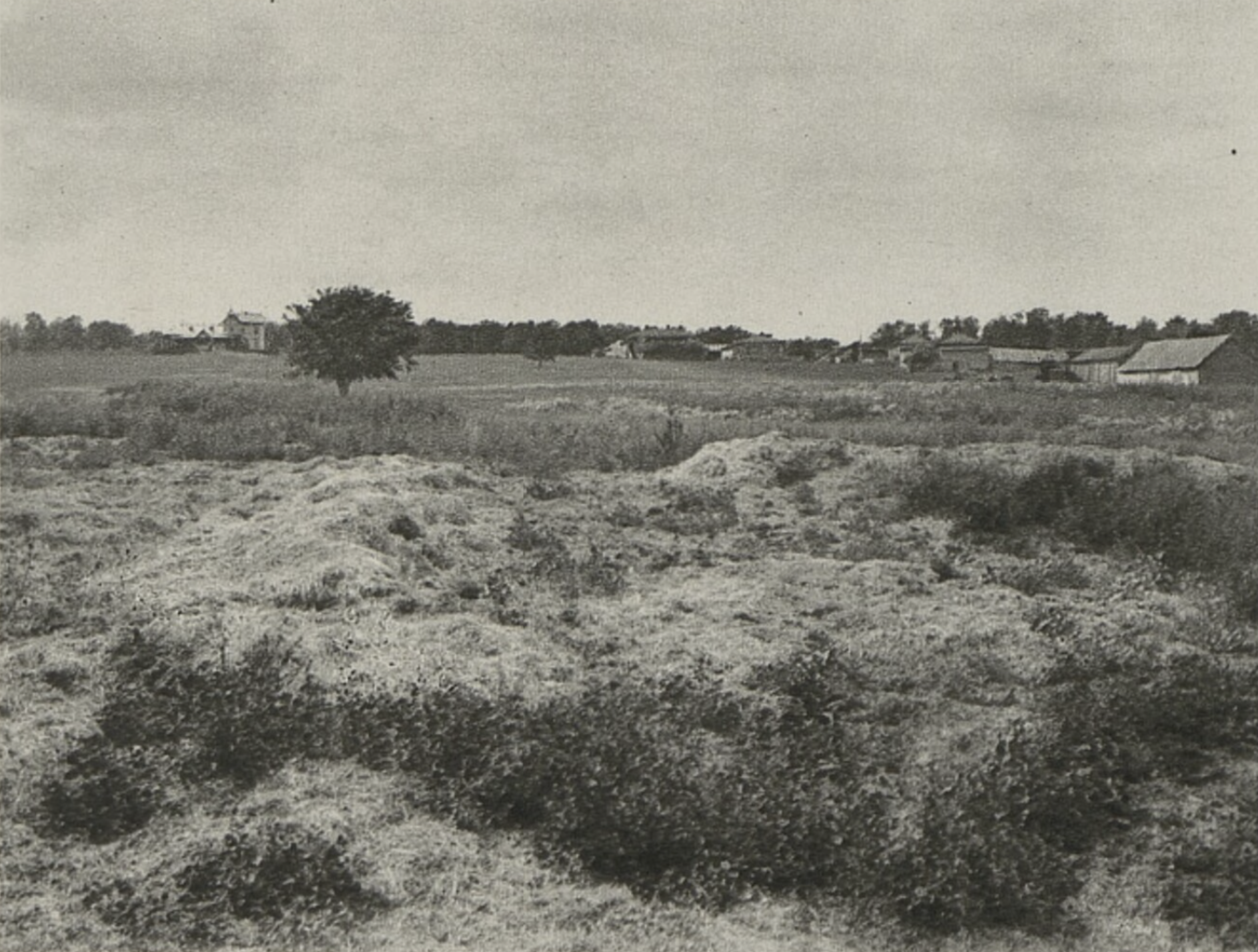
Battlefield of Lipyagi

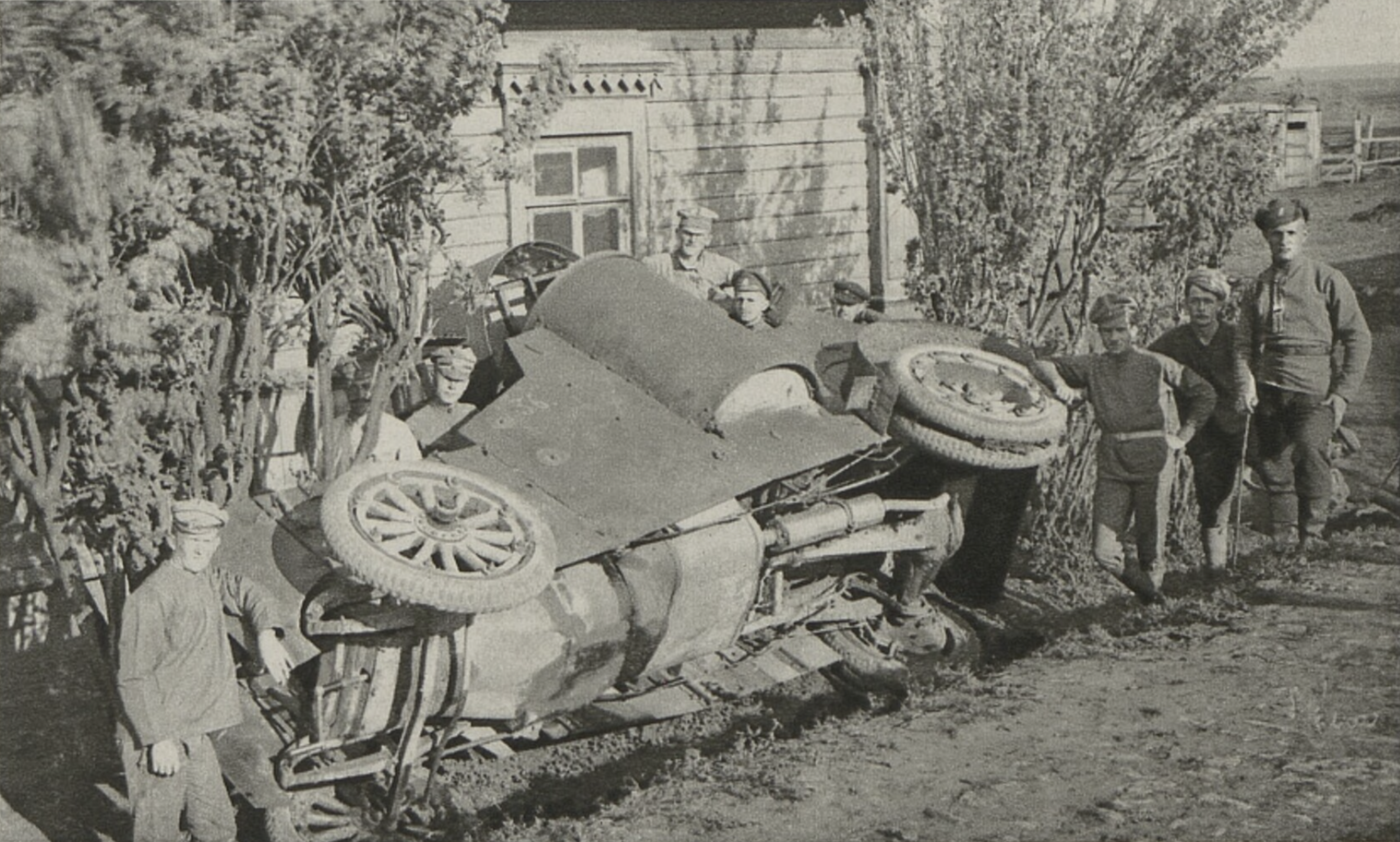
Legionnaries with a bolshevik armoured car destroyed in the battle

Lipyagy is a railway station in the Volga region, west of Samara. After the conclusion of a separate peace between Bolshevik Russia and the Central Powers, representatives of Czechoslovak resistance signed an agreement with the new Russian government on the transfer of legionary units to France via Vladivostok. After the Bolshevik detachments ambushed the trains, legionnaires took control of most of the Trans-Siberian Highway. About 6,000 soldiers under the leadership of Stanislav Čeček remained cut off in European territory.

In May 1918, there were increasingly frequent attacks on the legionnaires, who began to arm themselves again and defend themselves against these raids. The legionnaires near the city of Penza found themselves in the most difficult situation. An attack by the Red Guards was launched against them, but thanks to their indiscipline, the Czechoslovaks overcame them, captured Penza on May 28, and three days later occupied the bridge over the Volga and advanced to Samara. However, the Samara Soviet was not going to accept any compromise and an agreement on the passage of trains, and had fortified positions set up in front of the city at the Lipyagi railway station. At the same time, other troops were called in to surround and eliminate the Czechoslovak legionnaires. Czechoslovak the commanders were aware of this, so they deployed only 1,600 soldiers in the main attack on Lipyagi against 4,000 Red Army soldiers, the rest were to secure additional positions or be in reserve. Thirty minutes after midnight on 4 June 1918, Czechoslovaks began a bypass of the Soviet positions, which in the morning separated the enemy from Samara. At this time there was an attack that completely disrupted the defense of the railway station. Legionnaires penetrated the Soviet positions and the station was occupied.

== Aftermath ==
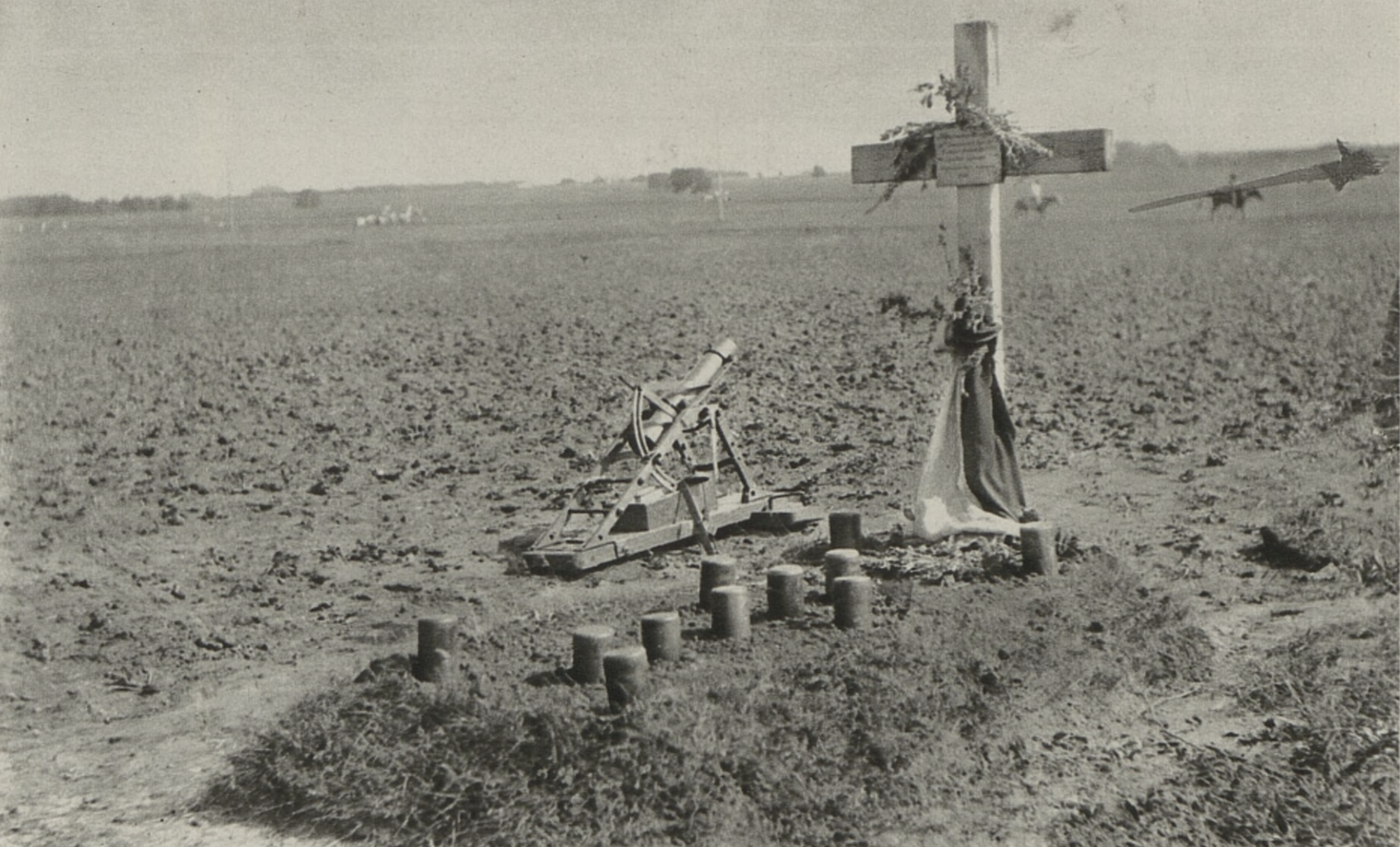
Fallen Cz. legionnary grave near Lipyagi

The battle ended in a major victory for the legions. On the Soviet side, there were 1,500 dead and over 2,000 captured. About 300 more Red Army men drowned in the swamps. The Czechoslovaks had only 30 dead and 89 wounded. They acquired all the weapons and equipment of the defeated. A few Red Army men who managed to escape to Samara caused panic among the Bolsheviks in the city, and they were no longer able to put up any resistance. The Legionnaires freed Samara. The path of the Czechoslovak legions to the east was thus free. The success of the troops on the highway completely stopped the agreed transport of German and Austro-Hungarian prisoners to the Western Front. Several hundred thousand prisoners thus never reinforced the German corps attacking Paris. Although Czechoslovaks, whose only goal was transportation to France, did not get to the Western Front from Russia (with the exception of less than 3 000 men who were transported to France by ship on the so-called "Northern route" via Archangelsk and Murmansk-Murmansk on Masaryk's order), but their activities on the highway helped the Allies of the Agreement to save this front.

Directly in connection with this victorious action Stanislav Čeček fought a successful Battle of Bezenchuk.

== See also ==
- Bibliography of the Russian Revolution and Civil War
- Outline of the Russian Revolution and Civil War
- Index of articles related to the Russian Revolution and Civil War
- The "Russian" Civil Wars, 1916–1926: Ten Years That Shook the World
- Russia in Flames: War, Revolution, Civil War, 1914–1921
- Russia in Revolution: An Empire in Crisis, 1890 to 1928
- Russia: Revolution and Civil War, 1917—1921
- The Russian Revolution: A New History
