= Bystřice (Benešov District) =

- Town
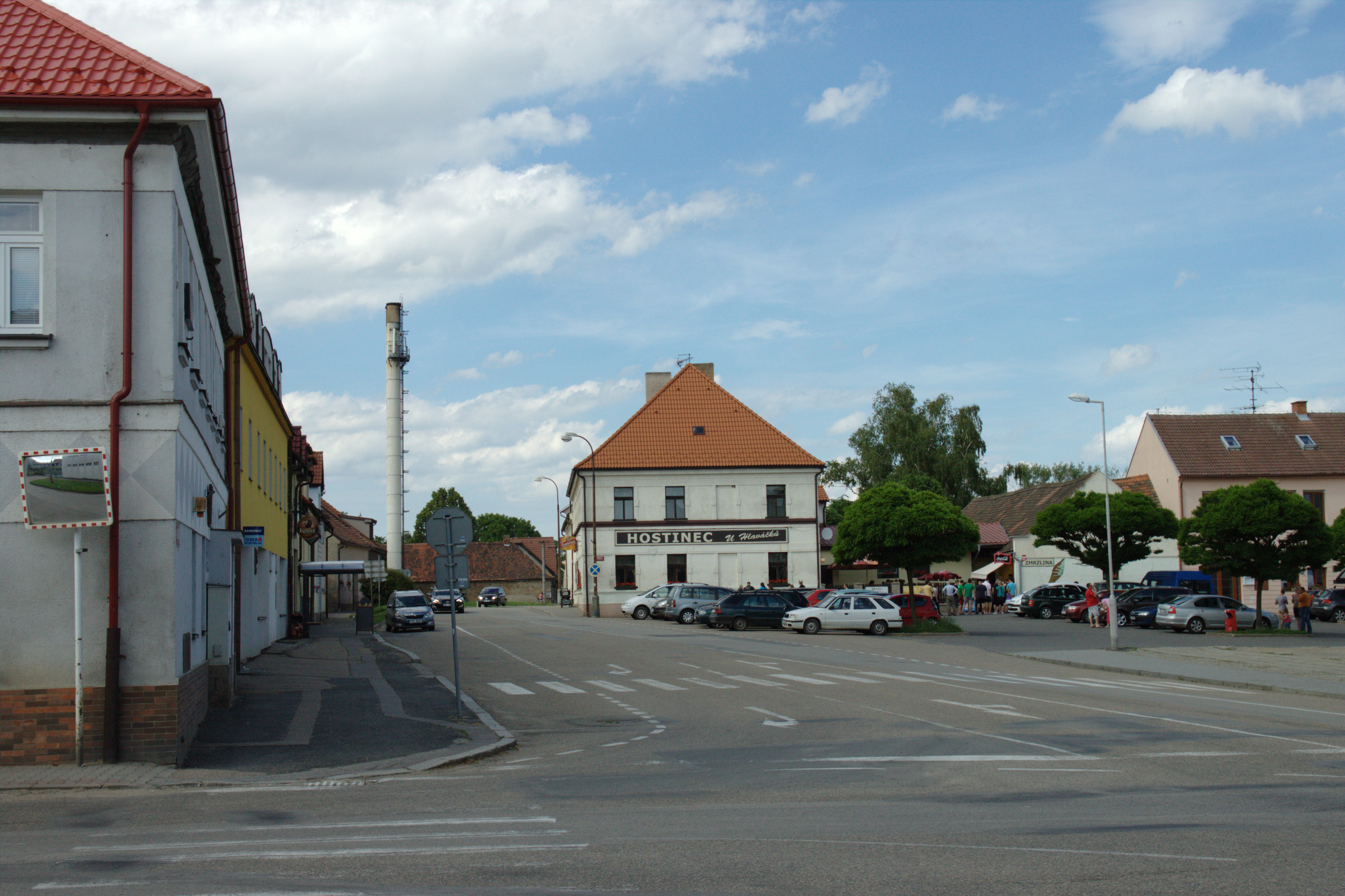
- Town square

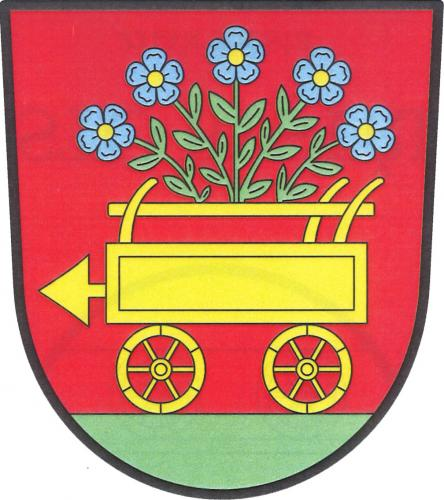
- Coat of arms

- Location in the Czech Republic
- Coordinates: 49°43′21″N 14°40′02″E
- Country: Czech Republic
- Region: Central Bohemian
- District: Benešov
- First mentioned: 1352

Government
  - Mayor: Michal Hodík

Area
  - Total: 63.36 km^{2} (24.46 sq mi)
- Elevation: 365 m (1,198 ft)

Population (2026-01-01)
  - Total: 4,694
  - Density: 74.08/km^{2} (191.9/sq mi)
- Time zone: UTC+1 (CET)
  - Summer (DST): UTC+2 (CEST)
- Postal code: 257 51
- Website: www.mestobystrice.cz

Bystřice (Czech pronunciation: [ˈbɪstr̝̊ɪtsɛ]; German: Bistritz bei Beneschau) is a town in Benešov District in the Central Bohemian Region of the Czech Republic. It has about 4,700 inhabitants. The town is located on the stream Konopišťský potok in the Benešov Uplands.

== Administrative division ==
Bystřice consists of 26 municipal parts (in brackets population according to the 2021 census):

- Bystřice (2,223)
- Božkovice (82)
- Drachkov (240)
- Hlivín (18)
- Hůrka (10)
- Jarkovice (152)
- Jeleneč (8)
- Jinošice (54)
- Jírovice (165)
- Jiřín (26)
- Kobylí a Plchov (40)
- Líšno (390)
- Líštěnec (7)
- Mlýny (15)
- Mokrá Lhota (224)
- Nesvačily (352)
- Opřetice (52)
- Ouběnice (110)
- Petrovice (16)
- Radošovice (78)
- Semovice (70)
- Strženec (21)
- Tožice (77)
- Tvoršovice (54)
- Vojslavice (20)
- Zahořany (24)

== Etymology ==
The name Bystřice was derived from the name of the local stream, which was formerly called Bystrá. The old Czech adjective bystrá used to mean 'fast-flowing', 'rapid'.

== Geography ==
Bystřice is located about 6 kilometres (4 mi) south of Benešov and 36 km (22 mi) southeast of Prague. It lies mostly in the Benešov Uplands. The eastern part of the municipal territory extends into the Vlašim Uplands and includes the highest point of Bystřice, the hill Žebrák at 585 m (1,919 ft) above sea level. The stream Konopišťský potok flows through the town and supplies several fishponds.

== History ==
The first written mention of Bystřice is from 1352. It was probably founded between 1258 and 1278 as a market village on a trade route. it was promoted to a market town by King George of Poděbrady in 1471. In 1999, Bystřice became a town.

== Demographics ==
Historical population

Year	Pop.	±%
1869	6,132	—
1880	5,828	−5.0%
1890	5,783	−0.8%
1900	5,850	+1.2%
1910	5,596	−4.3%

Year	Pop.	±%
1921	5,748	+2.7%
1930	5,613	−2.3%
1950	4,751	−15.4%
1961	4,642	−2.3%
1970	4,237	−8.7%

Year	Pop.	±%
1980	3,845	−9.3%
1991	3,803	−1.1%
2001	3,872	+1.8%
2011	4,276	+10.4%
2021	4,528	+5.9%

Source: Censuses

== Transport ==
The I/3 road (part of the European route E55), which connects the D1 motorway with Tábor and further continues as the D3 motorway, runs next to the town.

== Sights ==
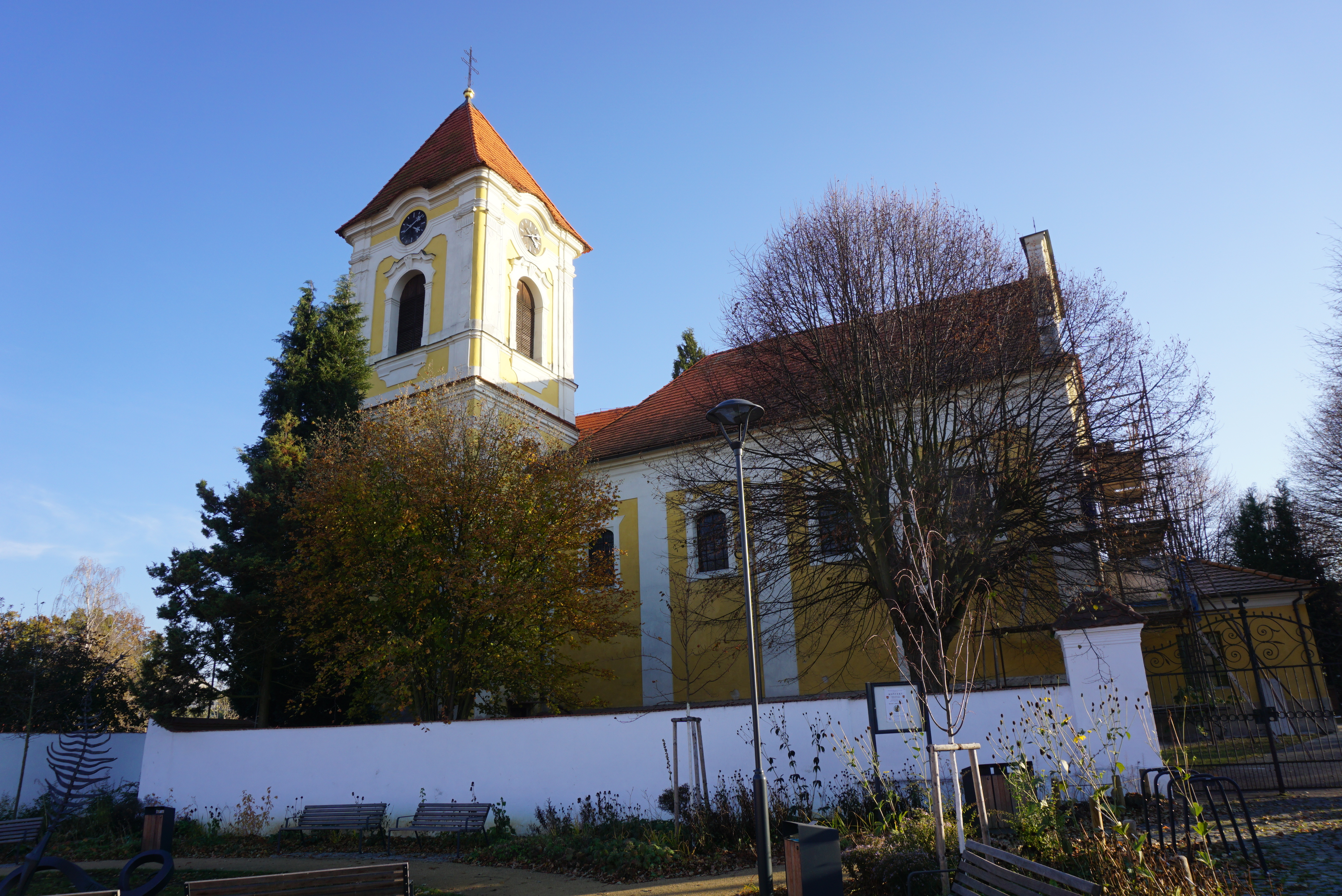
Church of Saints Simon and Jude

The Church of Saints Simon and Jude is originally a Gothic church, rebuilt in the Baroque style.

The Líšno Castle is located in the village of Líšno. It was founded around 1367. It was completely rebuilt in the Romantic style in 1873–1884 and the castle park was founded. Since 2015, the castle has been privately owned. It serves social and cultural purposes. In 2026, the castle's reconstruction was completed and it was opened to the public.

== Notable people ==
- Stanislav Čeček (1886–1930), general
- Zdeněk Štěpánek (1896–1968), actor
