= Stanislav Čeček =

Czech legioneer and general (1886–1930)

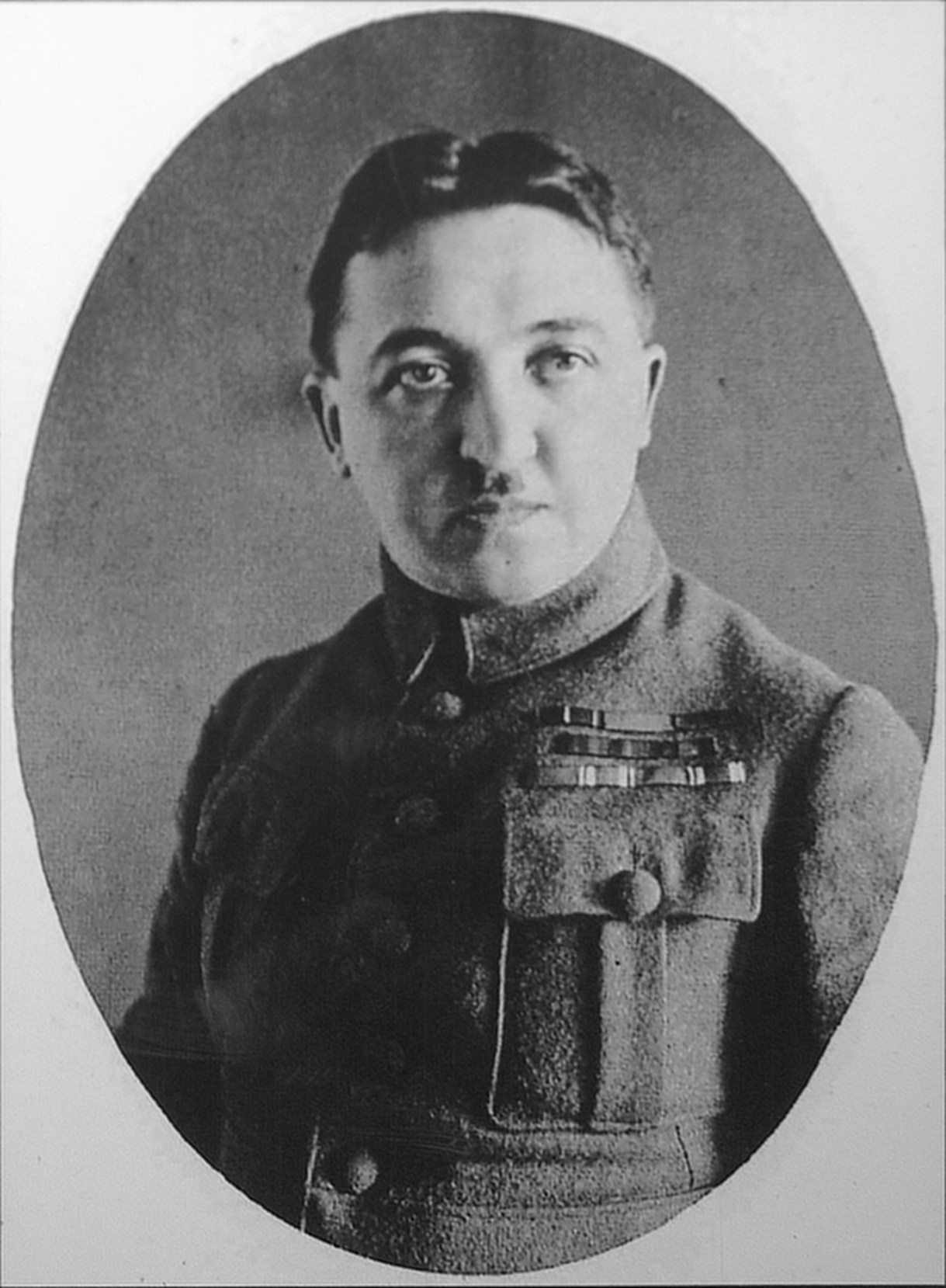
- Born: 13 November 1886; Líšno, Bohemia, Austria-Hungary
- Died: 29 May 1930 (aged 43) České Budějovice, Czechoslovakia
- Conflicts: World War I: Battle of Zborov (1917); Battle of Bakhmach; Russian Civil War: Battle of Lipyagi

Stanislav Čeček (13 November 1886 – 29 May 1930) was a Czech legioneer and general of the Czechoslovak Army.

== Biography ==
Stanislav Čeček was born in Líšno (today part of Bystřice near Benešov), Austria-Hungary. His father, Karel, was a forester, and Čeček went to the municipal school in Bystřice and then grammar school in Tábor before attending Prague Business Academy and Leipzig Business School. He joined Prague's 102nd Infantry Regiment as a lieutenant in 1907 and worked as a banker. He moved to Moscow in 1911 and worked at the Moscow office of Laurin & Klement company.

After the outbreak of World War I, Čeček joined the Czechoslovak contingent of the Imperial Russian Army. On 31 March 1917, he was awarded by Order of St. George (4th degree). Later he took part in the formation of the Czechoslovak Legion and became a commander of the 4th Regiment.

In May 1918, Čeček took part in the Revolt of the Czechoslovak Legion and became commander-in-chief of the Volga Front of People Army of Komuch. In October 1918 he went to Vladivostok and was evacuated from Russia in September 1920.

In Czechoslovakia Čeček became a deputy chief of the General Staff. During 1921–1923, he studied in France at École spéciale militaire de Saint-Cyr. After returning he received a rank of division general and became a chief of president's Military Office. From 1926 he was a chief of Aviation Department in the Defense Ministry. From 1928 he became a commander of 5th Infantry Division in České Budějovice.

He was also awarded Order of Saint Sava and Order of the White Eagle.
