= Statue of Jaroslav Hašek =

Sculpture in Prague, Czech Republic

- Socha Jaroslava Haška (Czech)
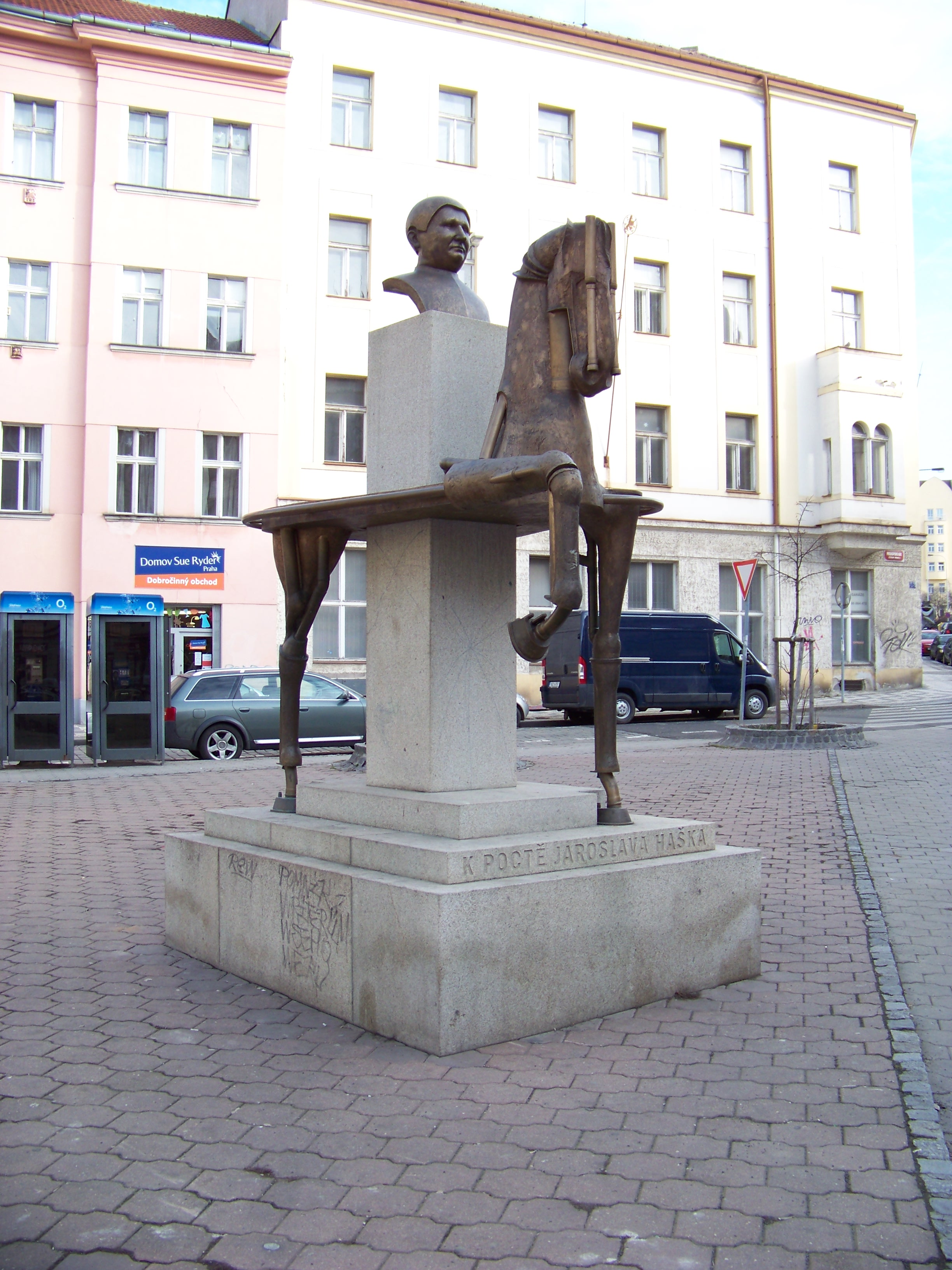
- The statue in 2011
- Artist: Karel Nepraš, Karolína Neprašová
- Completion date: 2005
- Type: Sculpture
- Subject: Jaroslav Hašek
- Location: Prague, Czech Republic; 50°5′11.48″N 14°27′9.5″E

The statue of Jaroslav Hašek (Czech: Socha Jaroslava Haška) is an outdoor monument and equestrian statue by Karel Nepraš and Karolína Neprašová, installed at Prokopovo náměstí in the Žižkov district of Prague, Czech Republic. The sculpture was installed in 2005, having been completed by Nepraš's daughter Karolína after his death. It is located in an area where Hašek lived during writing of his famous novel The Good Soldier Švejk.

== See also ==
- 2005 in art
- List of equestrian statues
