= Vyacheslav Troyanov =

- Вячеслав Платонович Троянов
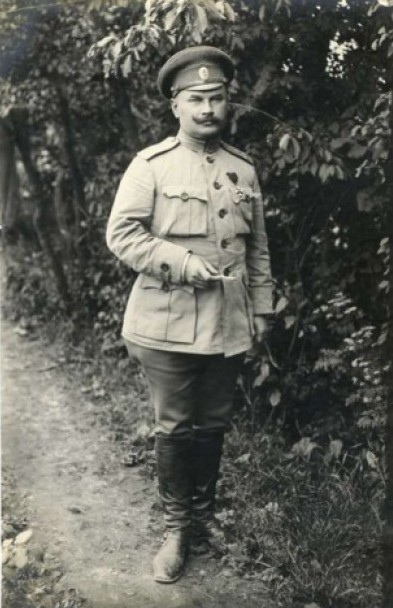
- Troyanov prior to 1918
- Born: 18 October 1875; Kharkov Governorate, Russian Empire
- Died: Spring 1918 (aged 42); Soviet Russia
- Military career
- Allegiance: Russian Empire; (Russian Empire) White movement
- Branch: (Russian Empire) Russian Imperial Army; (Russian Empire) White Army
- Service years: 1894–1918
- Rank: Major General
- Commands: Czechoslovak Legion; 1st Finland Rifle Division
- Conflicts: Russo-Japanese War; World War I; Kerensky Offensive; Battle of Zboriv; Romanian Campaign; Russian Civil War †
- Awards: Order of Saint Anna; Order of Saint Stanislaus; Order of Saint Vladimir; Order of St. George

Vyacheslav Platonovich Troyanov (Russian: Вячеслав Платонович Троянов; 18 October 1875 – 1918) was a Russian military leader who took part in the Russo-Japanese War, World War I, and the Russian Civil War. He was the organizer and first commander of the Czechoslovak Legion and achieved the rank of major general.

== Biography ==
=== Early life ===
Troyanov was born into a noble family in Kharkov Governorate in the Russian Empire on 18 October 1875. He graduated from a realschule (Russian: реальное училище) in Izium.

=== Early military career ===
In 1894 Troyanov began his Imperial Russian Army career in the 124th Voronezh Infantry Regiment. In 1896 he entered the Chuguev Military School as a cadet. He graduated on 29 March 1899 and was assigned to the 34th Sevsky Infantry Regiment. With that regiment, he took part in the Russo-Japanese War of 1904–1905 with the rank of lieutenant.

=== World War I ===
By the time the Russian Empire entered World War I on 1 August 1914, Troyanov was a captain in the Sevsky Regiment. For skillful leadership of troops under his command and personal courage, he was promoted to lieutenant colonel in March 1915.

On 20 April 1915, Troyanov was appointed commander of the Czechoslovak Legion, a volunteer force formed in the Russian Empire of former soldiers of the Austro-Hungarian Army of Czech and Slovak nationality who had switched sides to fight on the side of the Triple Entente against the Central Powers. Promoted to colonel, Troyanov was able to strengthen the fighting ability of the Czech Legion′s soldiers and to win their love and respect. Under his leadership, the Czechoslovak Legion defeated numerically superior enemy forces in heavy combat. At the end of 1915, the Czechoslovak detachment was transformed into a rifle regiment. In the spring of 1916, a second Czechoslovak Legion regiment was formed, and the Legion was reorganized as a two-regiment rifle brigade.

In the February Revolution in March 1917, Tsar Nicholas II of Russia was deposed, and the Russian Provisional Government that succeeded formed the Russian Republic. Troyanov stayed on in the post-imperial Russian Army, and on 1–2 July 1917, under Troyanov′s command, the Czechoslovak Legion defeated numerically superior Austro-Hungarian forces in Galicia in the Battle of Zboriv during the Kerensky Offensive. For his skillful leadership in the battle, Troyanov was promoted to major general and was made commander of the 1st Finland Rifle Division.

Together with the 1st Finland Rifle Division, Troyanov was reassigned to serve under the Romanian Front in the Romanian Campaign. He was there when the Bolsheviks toppled the Russian Provisional Government in the October Revolution of 7 November 1917.

=== Russian Civil War ===
The October Revolution led to the outbreak of the Russian Civil War. Troyanov fought in the White Army against the Bolsheviks. In the spring of 1918 he was killed in action during a battle with the Bolshevik Red Army.

== Awards and honors ==
- Order of Saint Anna Fourth Class (1904)
- Order of Saint Stanislaus Third Class with Swords and Bow (1904)
- Order of Saint Anna Third Class with Swords and Bow (1905)
- Order of Saint Vladimir Fourth Class with Swords and Bow (1905)
- Order of St. George Fourth Class (26 March 1915)
- Order of Saint Vladimir Third Class (30 January 1917)
