= Battle of Zborov (1917) =

Battle in the First World War

Coordinates: 49°40′N 25°9′E

- Part of the Kerensky offensive during the Eastern Front (World War I)
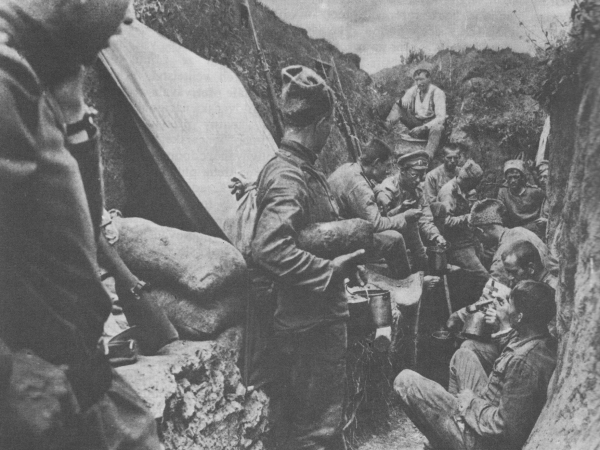
- Czechoslovak legionnaires in the trenches
Date	1–2 July 1917
Location	Zboriv, Galicia, Austria-Hungary (now Ukraine)
Result	Czechoslovak and Russian victory

Belligerents
(Bohemia) Czechoslovak Legion (Russia) Russian Provisional Government	Austria-Hungary; German Empire

Commanders and leaders
(Russian Republic) Vyacheslav Troyanov (Bohemia) Stanislav Čeček (Bohemia) Radola Gajda	(Austria-Hungary) Eduard von Böhm-Ermolli (German Empire) Arnold von Winckler

Strength
3,530	5,500

Casualties and losses
167 killed 700 wounded (17 fatally wounded); 11 missing	3,300 captured (62 officers); 20 guns captured

The Battle of Zborov (Зборівська битва, Zborivska bytva in Ukrainian, Зборовское сражение in Russian, Schlacht bei Zborów in German, bitva u Zborova in Czech, bitka pri Zborove in Slovak) was a part of the Kerensky Offensive (the last Russian offensive in World War I, taking place in July 1917). The battle was the first significant action of the Czechoslovak Legions (volunteers fighting against the Central Powers) on the Eastern Front.

== Background ==
As the reliability of many Russian military formations was in doubt, only units that volunteered to attack were used in the offensive. Among those who did was the Czechoslovak Riflemen Brigade (Československá střelecká brigáda), often called the Czechoslovak Legion, formed from three regiments of Czechs and Slovaks. The brigade (about 3,530 men), was low on equipment and training. Moreover, this was the first use of the brigade as a single formation; previously, the Russian command had used only smaller units of the brigade, mostly in reconnaissance actions. On the other hand, overall morale amongst the members of the brigade was very high.

The brigade was commanded by Russian Colonel Vyacheslav Platonovich Troyanov, but the tactical assault plan was prepared by Czech and Slovak officers serving in the Czechoslovak Legion. Professor Tomáš Masaryk, the main organizer of the Czechoslovak resistance against Austria-Hungary, was in telegraphic connection with colonel Nikolai Petrovich Mamontov so he could follow the situation from Saint Petersburg.

The brigade was deployed near Zboriv (Czech and Slovak: Zborov) in a sector of secondary importance. The 4th division protected it from the north, the 6th division from the south. The enemy, the army of Austria-Hungary, deployed four well entrenched and well equipped infantry regiments (IR), the IR 6, 35, 75 and 86 (in all, about 12,000 men).

== Battle ==
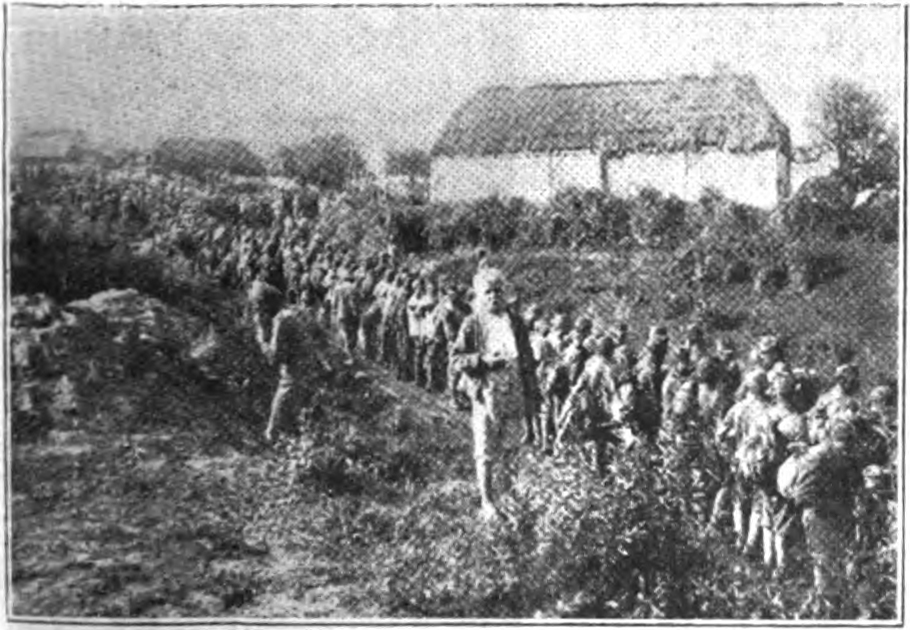
Counting Austrian prisoners

At 5:15 on the 2 July, the second day of the offensive, after an initial artillery bombardment, small groups of Legionnaires equipped with grenades attacked the enemy. At 8:00, Colonel Mamontov called Lieutenant Stanislav Čeček by phone to start the attack. After shock troops breached the barbed wire defenses, follow-up units took over to continue the attack. By 15:00 the Legion had advanced deep into enemy territory, breaking through the entire Austrian trench line; 3,300 enemy soldiers (62 officers) were captured, while 20 guns and large amounts of war material were seized. The Legion's losses were 167 killed, 17 mortally wounded, 11 missing and around 700 injured.

== Aftermath ==
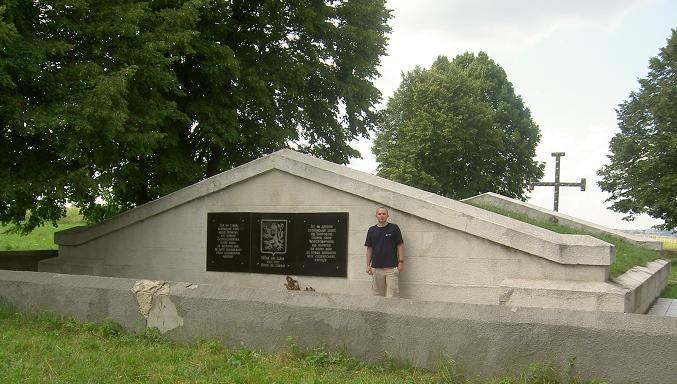
A memorial to the Legionnaires killed in the battle, Kalynivka, Ukraine

This success had little impact on the broader course of the offensive. However, the battle provided valuable propaganda and political capital for the leaders of the Czechoslovak resistance, and it persuaded the Russian government to lift restrictions on the formation of new units composed of Czech and Slovak soldiers captured during the war.

Moreover, news of the armed actions of the Czech resistance abroad reached the Czech population within Austria-Hungary for the first time. Any reference to Czech volunteers fighting on the side of the Entente was suppressed by censorship. But the surprising victory by the smaller Czechoslovak forces incited some Austrian politicians to demand an investigation of alleged treason by Czech units in the Austro-Hungarian Army and this made the victorious legionaries famous across the Empire.

After the war, the battle was used to propagate the heroic military cult surrounding the Legions who formed a cornerstone of the new Czechoslovak state. During the German occupation of Czechoslovakia (1939–1945), and later, when the communist party took power in 1948, the story was suppressed or ignored.

== In the arts ==
The battle was depicted in the 1938 Czech language propaganda film Zborov. The movie was based on a story by Rudolf Medek and directed by Jiří Slavíček and Jan Alfréd Holman. Due to the Munich Agreement, a shortened version of Zborov was first screened in January 1939.

== Sources ==
- Rudolf Medek, Vojtěch Holeček: "Bitva u Zborova a československý odboj" (Battle of Zborov and Czechoslovak resistance), 1922
- Jan Galandauer: "2.7.1917 Bitva u Zborova - Česká legenda" (June 2, 1917 Battle of Zborov - the Czech legend), 2002, ISBN 80-86515-16-8
- PRECLÍK, Vratislav. Masaryk a legie (TGM and legions), váz. kniha, 219 str., vydalo nakladatelství Paris Karviná, Žižkova 2379 (734 01 Karviná) ve spolupráci s Masarykovým demokratickým hnutím (Masaryk democratic movement in Prague), 2019, ISBN 978-80-87173-47-3
