= Lipyagi =

Lipyagi Липяги
- Khutor
- Location within Belgorod Oblast Location within Russia
- Coordinates: 51°21′N 37°44′E
- Country: Russia
- Region: Belgorod Oblast
- District: Starooskolsky District
- Time zone: UTC+3:00

Lipyagi (Russian: Липяги) is a rural locality (a khutor) in Starooskolsky District, Belgorod Oblast, Russia. The population was 19 as of 2010. There are 2 streets.

== Geography ==
Lipyagi is located 13 km northwest of Stary Oskol (the district's administrative centre) by road. Fedoseyevka is the nearest rural locality.
