= Vladimir Lenin =

Leader of the Soviet Union from 1922 to 1924

- Владимир Ленин
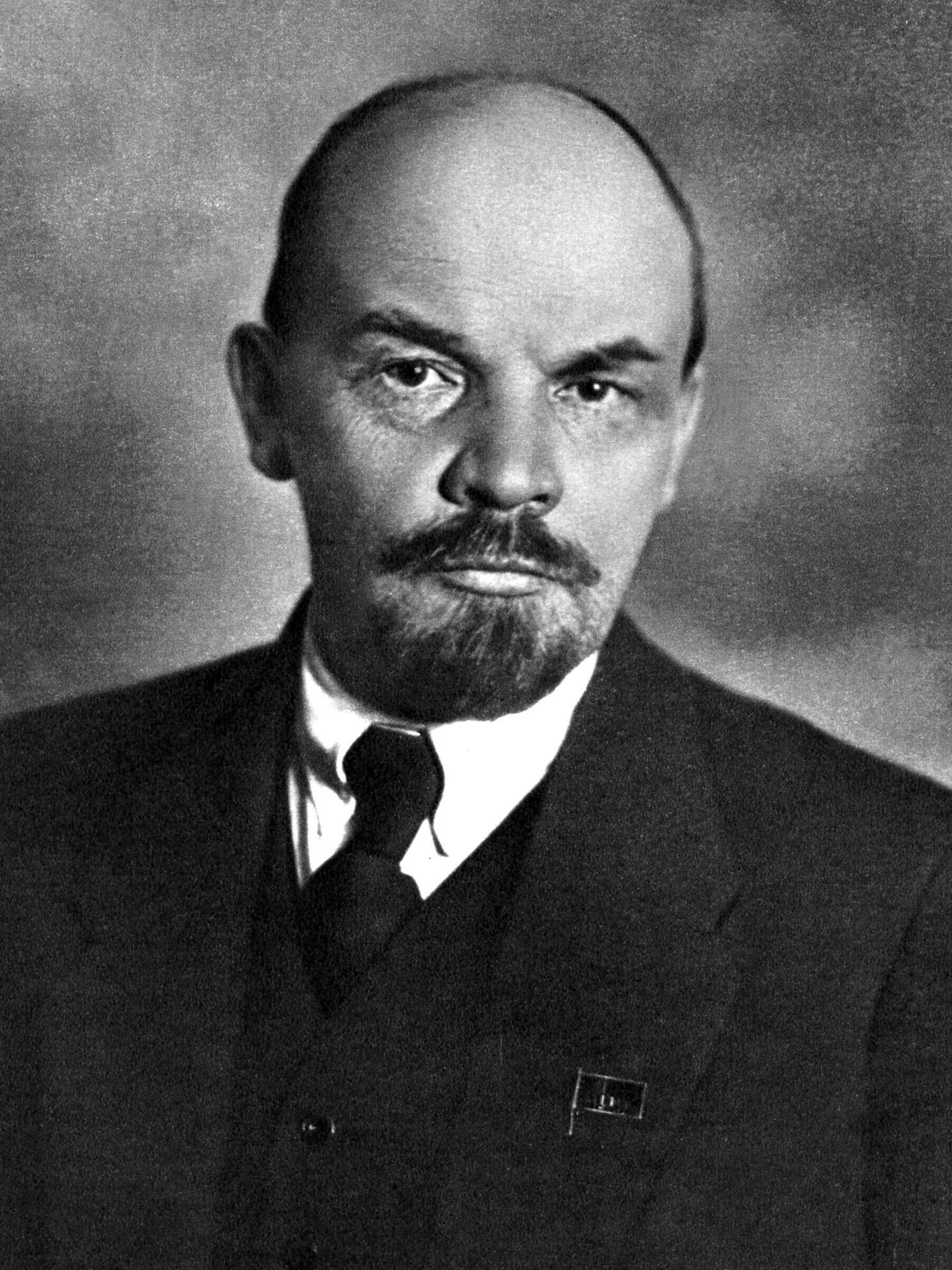
- Lenin in 1920

Premier of the Soviet Union
- In office 6 July 1923 – 21 January 1924
- Preceded by: Office established
- Succeeded by: Alexei Rykov

Chairman of the Council of People's Commissars of the Russian SFSR
- In office 9 November 1917 – 21 January 1924
- President: Lev Kamenev; Yakov Sverdlov; Mikhail Kalinin
- Preceded by: Alexander Kerensky (Note: As Chairman of the Russian Provisional Government)
- Succeeded by: Alexei Rykov

Personal details
- Born: Vladimir Ilyich Ulyanov; 22 April [O.S. 10 April] 1870 Simbirsk, Russian Empire
- Died: 21 January 1924 (aged 53) Gorki, Russian SFSR, Soviet Union
- Resting place: Lenin's Mausoleum, Moscow
- Party: RCP(b) (Note: Founded as the RSDLP(b) in 1912; renamed the RCP(b) in 1918.) (from 1912)
- Other political affiliations: RSDLP (1898‍–‍1912; Bolshevik faction from 1903); SBORK (1895‍–‍1898)
- Spouse: Nadezhda Krupskaya (m. 1898)
- Parents: Ilya Ulyanov; Maria Blank
- Relatives: Anna Ulyanova (sister); Aleksandr Ulyanov (brother); Olga Ilyinichna Ulyanova (sister); Dmitry Ilyich Ulyanov (brother); Maria Ilyinichna Ulyanova (sister)
- Education: Kazan Imperial University; Saint Petersburg Imperial University
- Lenin's voice Recorded 1919
- Central institution membership: 1917–1924: Full member, 6th–12th Politburo of RCP(b); 1912–1924: Full member, 6th–12th Central Committee of RCP(b); 1903–1905: Full member, 2nd and 3rd Central Committee of RSDLP; 1907–1912: Candidate member, 5th Central Committee of RSDLP; Other offices held: 1917–1918: Member of the Russian Constituent Assembly for Baltic Fleet; 1918–1920: Chairman, Council of Labour and Defence
- Leader of the Soviet Union: First holder; Stalin →

Vladimir Ilyich Ulyanov (Note: Russian: Владимир Ильич Ульянов, romanized: Vladimir Ilyich Ulyanov, IPA: [vlɐˈdʲimʲɪr ɨˈlʲjitɕ ʊˈlʲjanəf].) (22 April [O.S. 10 April] 1870 – 21 January 1924), better known as Vladimir Lenin, (Note: English: /ˈlɛnɪn/; Russian: Ленин, IPA: [ˈlʲenʲɪn].) was a Russian revolutionary, politician, and political theorist. He served as the first and founding head of government of Soviet Russia from 1917 to 1924 and of the Soviet Union from 1922 to 1924. Ideologically a Marxist, his developments to the ideology are called Leninism.

Born to an upper-middle-class family in Simbirsk, Lenin embraced revolutionary socialist politics following his brother's 1887 execution. Expelled from Kazan Imperial University for protesting against the Tsarist government, he devoted the following years to a law degree. He moved to Saint Petersburg in 1893 and became a senior Marxist activist. In 1897, he was arrested for sedition and exiled to Shushenskoye in Siberia, where he married Nadezhda Krupskaya. After his exile, he moved to Western Europe, where he became a prominent theorist in the Marxist Russian Social Democratic Labour Party (RSDLP). In 1903, he took a key role in the RSDLP ideological split, leading the Bolshevik faction. Following Russia's failed Revolution of 1905, he campaigned for the First World War to be transformed into a Europe-wide proletarian revolution, which, as a Marxist, he believed would cause the overthrow of capitalism and its replacement with socialism. After the 1917 February Revolution ousted the Tsar and established a Provisional Government, he returned to Russia to play a leading role in the October Revolution in which the Bolsheviks overthrew the new regime.

Lenin's Bolshevik government initially shared power with the Left Socialist Revolutionaries, elected soviets, and a multi-party Constituent Assembly, although by 1918 it had centralised power in the new Communist Party. Lenin's administration redistributed land among the peasantry and nationalised banks and large-scale industry. It withdrew from the First World War by signing a treaty conceding territory to the Central Powers, and promoted world revolution through the Communist International. Opponents were suppressed in the Red Terror, a violent campaign administered by the state security services; tens of thousands were killed or interned in concentration camps. His administration defeated right and left-wing anti-Bolshevik armies in the Russian Civil War from 1917 to 1922 and oversaw the Polish–Soviet War of 1919–1921. Responding to wartime devastation, famine, and popular uprisings, in 1921 Lenin encouraged economic growth through the New Economic Policy. Several non-Russian nations had secured independence from the Russian Republic after 1917, but five were forcibly re-united into the new Soviet Union in 1922, while others repelled Soviet invasions. With his health failing, Lenin died in Gorki, and Joseph Stalin succeeded him as the pre-eminent figure in the Soviet government.

Widely considered one of the most significant and influential figures of the 20th century, Lenin was the posthumous subject of a pervasive personality cult within the Soviet Union until its dissolution in 1991. He became an ideological figurehead behind Marxism–Leninism and a prominent influence over the international communist movement. A controversial and highly divisive historical figure, Lenin is viewed by his supporters as a champion of revolutionary socialism and internationalism. Meanwhile, Lenin's critics accuse him of establishing a totalitarian dictatorship which oversaw mass killings and political repression.

== Early life ==
=== Childhood: 1870–1887 ===
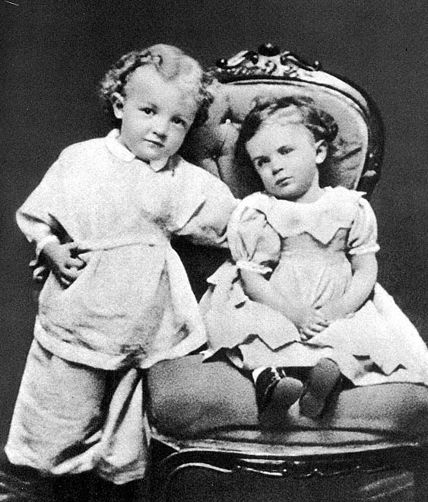
Lenin (left) at the age of three with his sister, Olga

Lenin was born Vladimir Ilyich Ulyanov in Streletskaya Ulitsa, Simbirsk, now Ulyanovsk, on 22 April 1870, and baptised several days later; as a child he was known as Volodya, the common nickname of Vladimir. He was the third of eight children, having two older siblings, Anna and Aleksandr. They were followed by three more children, Olga, Dmitry, and Maria. Two later siblings died in infancy. His father, Ilya Nikolayevich Ulyanov, was a member of the Russian Orthodox Church and baptised his children into it, although his mother, Maria Alexandrovna Ulyanova (née Blank), was largely indifferent to Christianity, a view that influenced her children.

Ilya Ulyanov was from a family of former serfs; Ilya's father's ethnicity remains unclear, with suggestions that he was of Russian, Chuvash, Mordvin, or Kalmyk ancestry. Despite a lower-class background, he had risen to middle-class status, studying physics and mathematics at Kazan University before teaching at the Penza Institute for the Nobility. In mid-1863, Ilya married Maria, the well-educated daughter of a wealthy Swedish Lutheran mother and a Russian Lutheran father who worked as a physician. After Lenin's death, researchers also claimed evidence that Lenin's maternal great-grandfather was a Jewish convert to Christianity. Previous researchers have argued the family was of German Lutheran origin, and were invited to Russia by Catherine the Great. According to historian Petrovsky-Shtern, Lenin was unaware of his mother's possible Jewish ancestry.

Soon after their wedding, Ilya obtained a job in Nizhny Novgorod, rising to become Director of Primary Schools in Simbirsk six years later. In 1874, he was promoted to Director of Public Schools for the province and simultaneously attained the rank of State Councillor, which granted him the status of hereditary nobleman. As the regional school director, Ilya oversaw the foundation of over 450 schools as a part of the government's plans for modernisation. In 1882, his dedication to education earned him the Order of Saint Vladimir.

Lenin's parents were monarchists and liberal conservatives, committed to the emancipation reform of 1861 introduced by the reformist Tsar Alexander II; they avoided political radicals and there is no evidence that the police ever put them under surveillance for subversive thought. Every summer they holidayed at a rural manor in Kokushkino. Among his siblings, Lenin was closest to his sister Olga, whom he often bossed around; he was extremely competitive and could be destructive, but usually admitted his misbehaviour. A keen sportsman, he spent much of his free time outdoors or playing chess, and excelled at school, the disciplinarian and conservative Simbirsk Classical Gymnasium.

In January 1886, when Lenin was 15, his father died of a brain haemorrhage. Lenin's behaviour became erratic and confrontational, and he renounced his belief in God. At the time, Lenin's elder brother Aleksandr, whom he affectionately knew as Sasha, was studying at Saint Petersburg University. Involved in political agitation against the absolute monarchy of the reactionary Tsar Alexander III, Aleksandr studied the writings of banned leftists and organised anti-government protests. He joined a revolutionary cell bent on assassinating the Tsar and was selected to construct a bomb. Before the attack could take place, the conspirators were arrested, and Aleksandr was executed in May 1887. Despite the emotional trauma of his father's and brother's deaths, Lenin graduated from school at the top of his class with a gold medal for exceptional performance, and decided to study law at Kazan University.

=== University and political radicalisation: 1887–1893 ===
Upon entering Kazan University in August 1887, Lenin moved into a nearby flat. While there, he joined a revolutionary cell run by the militant agrarian socialist Lazar Bogoraz, composed of leftists seeking to revive the Narodnaya Volya (People's Will). At the same time, he joined a zemlyachestvo, a form of university society that represented the men of a particular region. The group elected him as its representative to the university's zemlyachestvo council, and he took part in a December demonstration against government restrictions that banned student societies. The police arrested Lenin and accused him of being a ringleader in the demonstration; he was expelled from the university, and the Ministry of Internal Affairs exiled him to his family's Kokushkino estate. He read voraciously, becoming enamoured with Nikolay Chernyshevsky's 1863 pro-revolutionary novel What Is to Be Done?

Lenin's mother was concerned by her son's radicalisation, and was instrumental in convincing the Interior Ministry to allow him to return to Kazan, but not the university. Soviet historiography would later claim that, on his return to Kazan, Lenin became involved with Nikolai Fedoseev's Marxist revolutionary circle, through which he would discover Karl Marx's 1867 book Das Kapital. However, it was not until 1888 that Fedoseev founded a Marxist study group, at which time Lenin had already left the city; this meant that Lenin and Fedoseev did not meet.

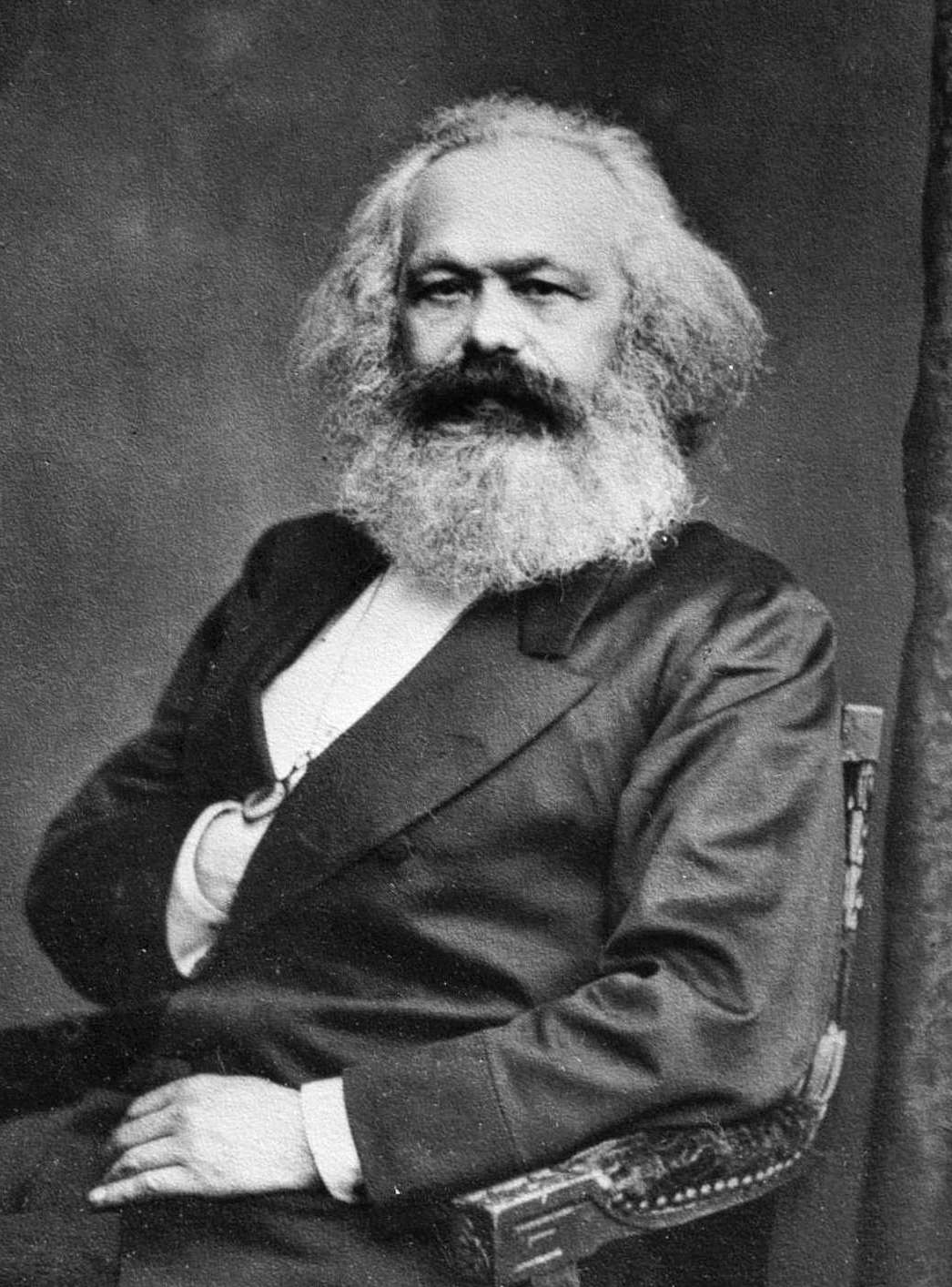
Lenin was influenced by the works of Karl Marx.

In September 1889, the Ulyanov family moved to Samara, where Lenin joined Alexei Sklyarenko's socialist discussion circle. Wary of his political views, his mother had previously bought a country estate in Alakaevka village, Samara Oblast, in the hope that her son would turn his attention to agriculture. He had little interest in farm management, and his mother soon sold the land, keeping the house as a summer home.

While in Samara, Lenin began to embrace Marxism, producing a Russian translation of Marx and Friedrich Engels' 1848 political pamphlet, The Communist Manifesto. He began to read the works of the Russian Marxist Georgi Plekhanov, agreeing with Plekhanov's argument that Russia was moving from feudalism to capitalism and so socialism would be implemented by the proletariat, or urban working class, rather than the peasantry. This Marxist perspective contrasted with the view of the agrarian-socialist Narodnik movement, which held that the peasantry could establish socialism in Russia by forming peasant communes, thereby bypassing capitalism. This Narodnik view developed in the 1860s with the Narodnaya Volya and was then dominant within the Russian revolutionary movement. Lenin rejected the premise of the agrarian-socialist argument but was influenced by agrarian-socialists like Pyotr Tkachev and Sergei Nechaev and befriended several Narodniks.

In May 1890, Maria, who retained societal influence as the widow of a nobleman, persuaded the authorities to allow Lenin to take his exams externally at the University of St Petersburg, where he obtained the equivalent of a first-class degree with honours. The graduation celebrations were marred when his sister Olga died of typhoid. Lenin remained in Samara for several years, working first as a legal assistant for a regional court and then for a local lawyer. He devoted much time to radical politics, remaining active in Sklyarenko's group and formulating ideas about how Marxism applied to Russia. Inspired by Plekhanov's work, Lenin collected data on Russian society, using it to support a Marxist interpretation of societal development and counter the claims of the Narodniks. He wrote a paper on peasant economics; it was rejected by the liberal journal Russian Mind.

== Revolutionary activity ==
=== Early activism and imprisonment: 1893–1900 ===
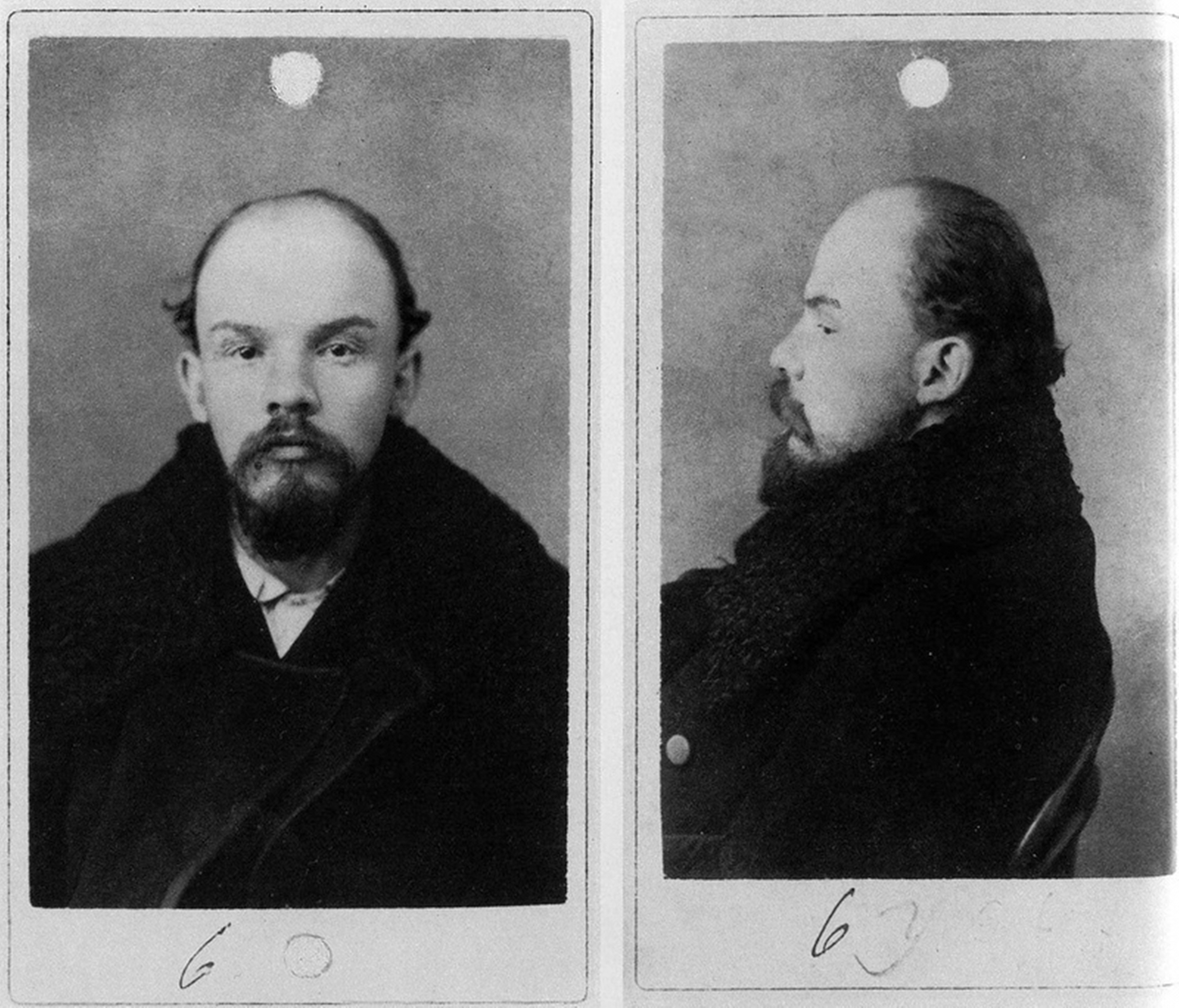
Police mugshot of Vladimir Lenin, 1895

In late 1893, Lenin moved to Saint Petersburg. There, he worked as a barrister's assistant and rose to a senior position in a Marxist revolutionary cell that called itself the Social-Democrats after the Marxist Social Democratic Party of Germany. Championing Marxism within the socialist movement, he encouraged the founding of revolutionary cells in Russia's industrial centres. By late 1894, he was leading a Marxist workers' circle, and meticulously covered his tracks to evade police spies. He began a romantic relationship with Nadezhda "Nadya" Krupskaya, a Marxist school teacher. He also authored a political tract criticising the Narodnik agrarian-socialists, What the "Friends of the People" Are and How They Fight the Social-Democrats; around 200 copies were illegally printed in 1894.

Hoping to cement connections between his Social-Democrats and Emancipation of Labour, a group of Russian Marxists based in Switzerland, Lenin visited the country to meet group members Plekhanov and Pavel Axelrod. He proceeded to Paris to meet Marx's son-in-law Paul Lafargue and to research the Paris Commune of 1871, which he considered an early prototype for a proletarian government. Financed by his mother, he stayed in a Swiss health spa before travelling to Berlin, where he studied for six weeks at the Staatsbibliothek and met the Marxist Wilhelm Liebknecht. Returning to Russia with illegal revolutionary publications, he travelled to various cities distributing literature to striking workers. While involved in producing a news sheet, Rabochee delo (Workers' Cause), he was among 40 activists arrested in St. Petersburg and charged with sedition.

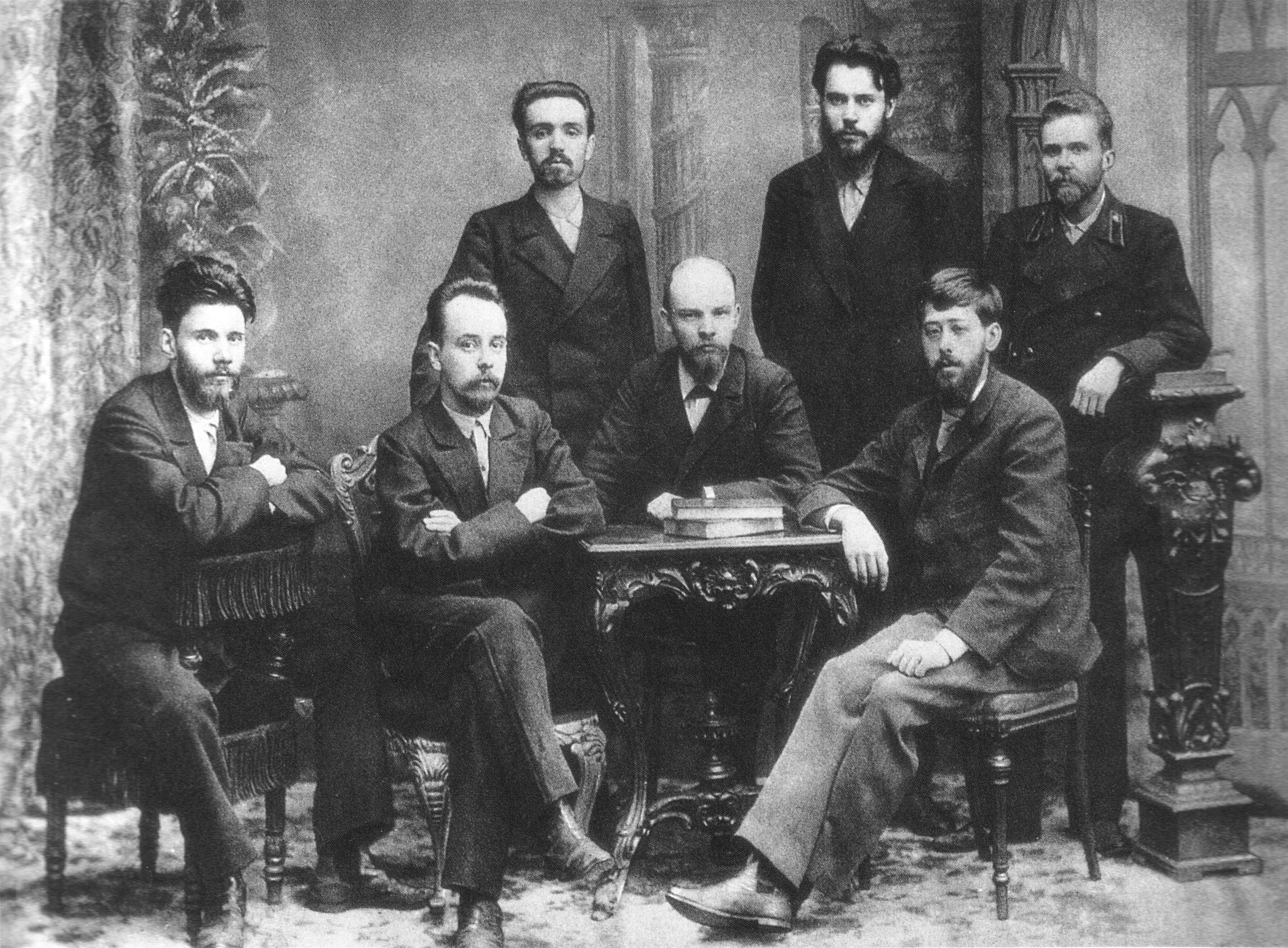
Lenin (seated centre) with other members of the League of Struggle for the Emancipation of the Working Class, 1897

Refused legal representation or bail, Lenin denied all charges but remained imprisoned for a year before sentencing. He spent this time theorising and writing. In this work he noted that the rise of industrial capitalism in Russia had caused large numbers of peasants to move to the cities, where they formed a proletariat. Lenin argued that this Russian proletariat would develop class consciousness, which would lead them to violently overthrow Tsarism, the aristocracy, and the bourgeoisie and to establish a dictatorship of the proletariat that would move toward socialism.

In February 1897, Lenin was sentenced without trial to three years' exile in eastern Siberia. He was granted a few days in Saint Petersburg to put his affairs in order and used this time to meet with the Social-Democrats, who had renamed themselves the League of Struggle for the Emancipation of the Working Class. His journey to eastern Siberia took 11 weeks, for much of which he was accompanied by his mother and sisters. Deemed only a minor threat to the government, he was exiled to Shushenskoye, Minusinsky District, where he was kept under police surveillance; he was nevertheless able to correspond with other revolutionaries, many of whom visited him, and permitted to go on trips to swim in the Yenisei River and to hunt duck and snipe.

In May 1898, Nadya joined him in exile, having been arrested in August 1896 for organising a strike. She was initially posted to Ufa, but persuaded the authorities to move her to Shushenskoye, where she and Lenin married on 10 July 1898. Settling into a family life with Nadya's mother Elizaveta Vasilyevna, in Shushenskoye the couple translated English socialist literature into Russian. There, Lenin wrote A Protest by Russian Social-Democrats to criticise German Marxist revisionists like Eduard Bernstein who advocated a peaceful, electoral path to socialism. He also finished The Development of Capitalism in Russia (1899), his longest book to date, which criticised the agrarian-socialists and promoted a Marxist analysis of Russian economic development. Published under the pseudonym of Vladimir Ilin, upon publication it received predominantly poor reviews.

=== Munich, London, and Geneva: 1900–1905 ===
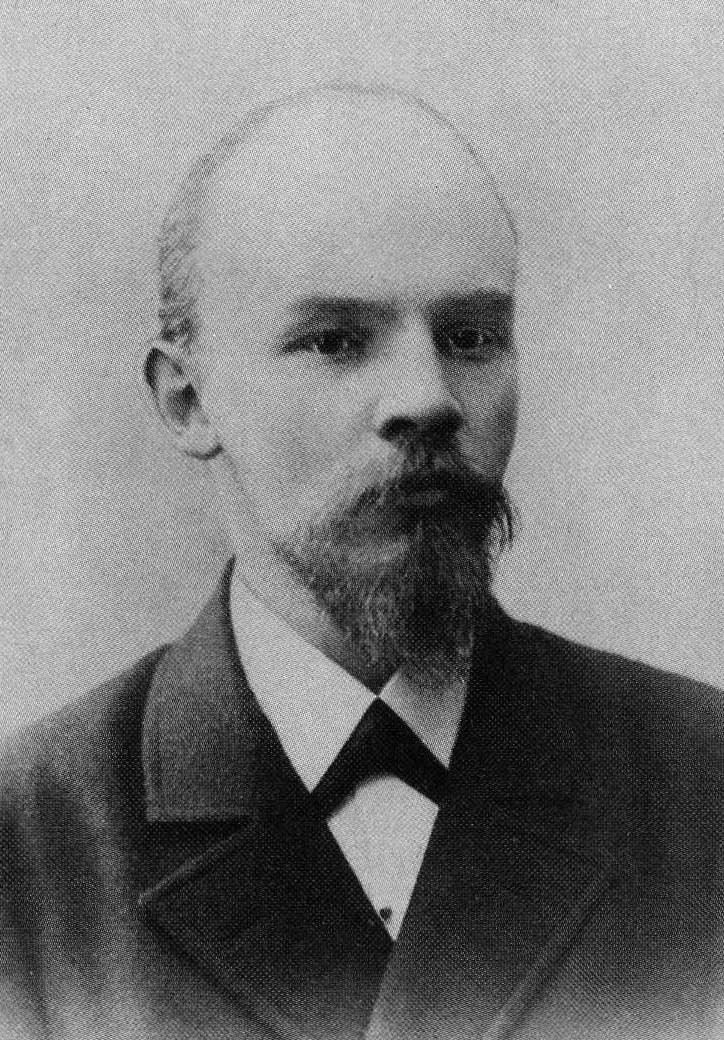
Lenin in 1900

After his exile, Lenin settled in Pskov in early 1900. There, he began raising funds for a newspaper, Iskra (Spark), a new organ of the Russian Marxist party, now calling itself the Russian Social Democratic Labour Party (RSDLP). In July 1900, Lenin left Russia for Western Europe; in Switzerland he met other Russian Marxists, and at a Corsier conference they agreed to launch the paper from Munich, where Lenin relocated in September. Containing contributions from prominent European Marxists, Iskra was smuggled into Russia, becoming the country's most successful underground publication since the 1850s. He first adopted the pseudonym Lenin in December 1901, possibly based on the Siberian Lena River; he often used the fuller pseudonym of N. Lenin, and while the N did not stand for anything, a popular misconception later arose that it represented Nikolai. Under this pseudonym, in 1902 he published his most influential publication to date, the pamphlet What Is to Be Done?, which outlined his thoughts on the need for a vanguard party to lead the proletariat to revolution. He also used the name "Jacob Richter" to get a reader's ticket at the British Museum Reading Room.

Nadya joined Lenin in Munich and became his secretary. They continued their political agitation, as Lenin wrote for Iskra and drafted the RSDLP programme, attacking ideological dissenters and external critics, particularly the Socialist Revolutionary Party (SR), a Narodnik agrarian-socialist group founded in 1901. Despite remaining a Marxist, he accepted the Narodnik view on the revolutionary power of the Russian peasantry, accordingly penning the 1903 pamphlet To the Village Poor. To evade Bavarian police, Lenin moved to London with Iskra in April 1902, where he befriended fellow Russian-Ukrainian Marxist Leon Trotsky. Lenin fell ill with erysipelas and was unable to take such a leading role on the Iskra editorial board; in his absence, the board moved its base of operations to Geneva.

The second RSDLP Congress was held in London in July 1903. At the conference, a schism emerged between Lenin's supporters and those of Julius Martov. Martov argued that party members should be able to express themselves independently of the party leadership; Lenin disagreed, emphasising the need for a strong leadership with complete control over the party. Lenin's supporters were in the majority, and he termed them the "majoritarians" (bol'sheviki in Russian; Bolsheviks); in response, Martov termed his followers the "minoritarians" (men'sheviki; Mensheviks). Arguments between Bolsheviks and Mensheviks continued after the conference; the Bolsheviks accused their rivals of being opportunists and reformists who lacked discipline, while the Mensheviks accused Lenin of being a despot and autocrat. Enraged at the Mensheviks, Lenin resigned from the Iskra editorial board and in May 1904 published the anti-Menshevik tract One Step Forward, Two Steps Back. The stress made Lenin ill, and to recuperate he holidayed in Switzerland. The Bolshevik faction grew in strength; by spring 1905, the whole RSDLP Central Committee was Bolshevik, and in December they founded the newspaper Vperyod (Forward).

=== Revolution of 1905 and its aftermath: 1905–1914 ===
In January 1905, the Bloody Sunday massacre of protesters in St. Petersburg sparked a spate of civil unrest in the Russian Empire known as the Revolution of 1905. Lenin urged Bolsheviks to take a greater role in the events, encouraging violent insurrection. In doing so, he adopted SR slogans regarding "armed insurrection", "mass terror", and "the expropriation of gentry land", resulting in Menshevik accusations that he had deviated from orthodox Marxism. In turn, he insisted that the Bolsheviks split completely with the Mensheviks; many Bolsheviks refused, and both groups attended the Third RSDLP Congress, held in London in April 1905. Lenin presented many of his ideas in the pamphlet Two Tactics of Social Democracy in the Democratic Revolution, published in August 1905. Here, he predicted that Russia's liberal bourgeoisie would be sated by a transition to constitutional monarchy and thus betray the revolution; instead, he argued that the proletariat would have to build an alliance with the peasantry to overthrow the Tsarist regime and establish the "provisional revolutionary democratic dictatorship of the proletariat and the peasantry".

The uprising has begun. Force against Force. Street fighting is raging, barricades are being thrown up, rifles are cracking, guns are booming. Rivers of blood are flowing, the civil war for freedom is blazing up. Moscow and the South, the Caucasus and Poland are ready to join the proletariat of St. Petersburg. The slogan of the workers has become: Death or Freedom!

— Lenin on the Revolution of 1905

In response to the revolution of 1905, which had failed to overthrow the government, Tsar Nicholas II accepted a series of liberal reforms in his October Manifesto. In this climate, Lenin felt it safe to return to Saint Petersburg. Joining the editorial board of Novaya Zhizn (New Life), a radical legal newspaper run by Maria Andreyeva, he used it to discuss issues facing the RSDLP. He encouraged the party to seek out a much wider membership, and advocated the continual escalation of violent confrontation, believing both to be necessary for a successful revolution. Recognising that membership fees and donations from a few wealthy sympathisers were insufficient to finance the Bolsheviks' activities, Lenin endorsed the idea of robbing post offices, railway stations, trains, and banks. Under the lead of Leonid Krasin, a group of Bolsheviks began carrying out such criminal actions, the best-known taking place in June 1907, when a group of Bolsheviks acting under the leadership of Joseph Stalin committed an armed robbery of the State Bank in Tiflis, Georgia.

Although he briefly supported the idea of reconciliation between Bolsheviks and Mensheviks, Lenin's advocacy of violence and robbery was condemned by the Mensheviks at the Fourth RSDLP Congress, held in Stockholm in April 1906. After Lenin escaped to Finland from Russia, he was involved in setting up a Bolshevik Centre in Kuokkala, Grand Duchy of Finland, which was at the time an autonomous state controlled by the Russian Empire, before the Bolsheviks regained dominance of the RSDLP at its Fifth Congress, held in London in May 1907. As the Tsarist government cracked down on opposition, both by disbanding Russia's legislative assembly, the Second Duma, and by ordering its secret police, the Okhrana, to arrest revolutionaries, Lenin fled Finland for Switzerland. There, he tried to exchange those banknotes stolen in Tiflis that had identifiable serial numbers on them.

Alexander Bogdanov and other prominent Bolsheviks decided to relocate the Bolshevik Centre to Paris; although Lenin disagreed, he moved to the city in December 1908. Lenin disliked Paris, lambasting it as "a foul hole", and while there he sued a motorist who knocked him off his bike. Lenin became very critical of Bogdanov's view that Russia's proletariat had to develop a socialist culture to become a successful revolutionary vehicle. Instead, Lenin favoured a vanguard of socialist intelligentsia who would lead the working-classes in revolution. Furthermore, Bogdanov, influenced by Ernst Mach, believed that all concepts of the world were relative, whereas Lenin stuck to the orthodox Marxist view that there was an objective reality independent of human observation. Bogdanov and Lenin holidayed together at Maxim Gorky's villa in Capri in April 1908; on returning to Paris, Lenin encouraged a split within the Bolshevik faction between his and Bogdanov's followers, accusing the latter of deviating from Marxism.

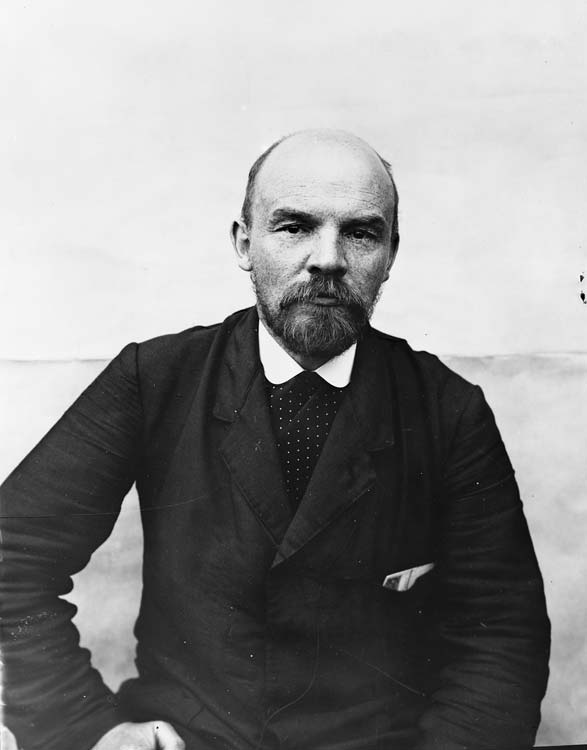
Lenin in 1914

In May 1908, Lenin lived briefly in London, where he used the British Museum Reading Room to write Materialism and Empirio-criticism, an attack on what he described as the "bourgeois-reactionary falsehood" of Bogdanov's relativism. Lenin's factionalism began to alienate increasing numbers of Bolsheviks, including his former close supporters Alexei Rykov and Lev Kamenev. The Okhrana exploited his factionalist attitude by sending a spy, Roman Malinovsky, to act as a vocal Lenin supporter within the party. Various Bolsheviks expressed their suspicions about Malinovsky to Lenin, although it is unclear if the latter was aware of the spy's duplicity; it is possible that he used Malinovsky to feed false information to the Okhrana.

In August 1910, Lenin attended the 8th Congress of the Second International, an international meeting of socialists, in Copenhagen as the RSDLP's representative, following this with a holiday in Stockholm with his mother. With his wife and sisters, he then moved to France, settling first in Bombon and then Paris. Here, he became a close friend to the French Bolshevik Inessa Armand; some biographers suggest that they had an extra-marital affair from 1910 to 1912. Meanwhile, at a Paris meeting in June 1911, the RSDLP Central Committee decided to move their focus of operations back to Russia, ordering the closure of the Bolshevik Centre and its newspaper, Proletari. Seeking to rebuild his influence in the party, Lenin arranged for a party conference to be held in Prague in January 1912, and although 16 of the 18 attendants were Bolsheviks, he was heavily criticised for his factionalist tendencies and failed to boost his status within the party.

Moving to Kraków in the Kingdom of Galicia and Lodomeria, a culturally Polish part of the Austro-Hungarian Empire, he used Jagiellonian University's library to conduct research. He stayed in close contact with the RSDLP, which was operating in the Russian Empire, convincing the Duma's Bolshevik members to split from their parliamentary alliance with the Mensheviks. In January 1913, Stalin, whom Lenin referred to as the "wonderful Georgian", visited him, and they discussed the future of non-Russian ethnic groups in the Empire. Due to the ailing health of both Lenin and his wife, they moved to the rural town of Biały Dunajec, before heading to Bern for Nadya to have surgery on her goitre.

=== First World War: 1914–1917 ===
The [First World] war is being waged for the division of colonies and the robbery of foreign territory; thieves have fallen out–and to refer to the defeats at a given moment of one of the thieves in order to identify the interests of all thieves with the interests of the nation or the fatherland is an unconscionable bourgeois lie.

— Lenin on his interpretation of the First World War

Lenin was in Galicia when the First World War broke out. The war pitted the Russian Empire against the Austro-Hungarian Empire, and due to his Russian citizenship, Lenin was arrested and briefly imprisoned until his anti-Tsarist credentials were explained. Lenin and his wife returned to Bern, before relocating to Zurich in February 1916. Lenin was angry that the German Social Democratic Party was supporting the German war effort, which was a direct contravention of the Second International's Stuttgart resolution that socialist parties would oppose the conflict and saw the Second International as defunct. He attended the Zimmerwald Conference in September 1915 and the Kienthal Conference in April 1916, urging socialists across the continent to convert the "imperialist war" into a continent-wide "civil war" with the proletariat pitted against the bourgeoisie and aristocracy. In July 1916, Lenin's mother died, but he was unable to attend her funeral. Her death deeply affected him, and he became depressed, fearing that he too would die before seeing the proletarian revolution.

In September 1917, Lenin published Imperialism, the Highest Stage of Capitalism, which argued that imperialism was a product of monopoly capitalism, as capitalists sought to increase their profits by extending into new territories where wages were lower and raw materials cheaper. He believed that competition and conflict would increase and that war between the imperialist powers would continue until they were overthrown by proletariat revolution and socialism established. He spent much of this time reading the works of Georg Wilhelm Friedrich Hegel, Ludwig Feuerbach, and Aristotle, all of whom had been key influences on Marx. This changed Lenin's interpretation of Marxism; whereas he once believed that policies could be developed based on predetermined scientific principles, he concluded that the only test of whether a policy was correct was its practice. He still perceived himself as an orthodox Marxist, but he began to diverge from some of Marx's predictions about societal development; whereas Marx had believed that a "bourgeoisie-democratic revolution" of the middle classes had to take place before a "socialist revolution" of the proletariat, Lenin believed that in Russia the proletariat could overthrow the Tsarist regime without an intermediate revolution.

=== February Revolution and the July Days: 1917 ===
Lenin's travel route from Zurich to Saint Petersburg in April 1917, including the ride in a sealed train through German territory

In February 1917, the February Revolution broke out in Saint Petersburg, renamed Petrograd at the beginning of the First World War, as industrial workers went on strike over food shortages and deteriorating factory conditions. The unrest spread to other parts of Russia, and fearing that he would be violently overthrown, Tsar Nicholas II abdicated. The State Duma took over control of the country, establishing the Russian Provisional Government and converting the Empire into a new Russian Republic. When Lenin learned of this from his base in Switzerland, he celebrated with other dissidents. He decided to return to Russia to take charge of the Bolsheviks but found that most passages into the country were blocked due to the ongoing conflict. He organised a plan with other dissidents to negotiate a passage for them through Germany, with which Russia was then at war. Recognising that these dissidents could cause problems for their Russian enemies, the German government agreed to permit 32 Russian citizens to travel by train through their territory, among them Lenin and his wife. For political reasons, Lenin and the Germans agreed to a cover story that Lenin had travelled by sealed train carriage through German territory, but in fact the train was not truly sealed, and the passengers were allowed to disembark to, for example, spend the night in Frankfurt. The group travelled by train from Zurich to Sassnitz, proceeding by ferry to Trelleborg, Sweden, and from there to the Haparanda–Tornio border crossing and then to Helsinki before taking the final train to Petrograd.

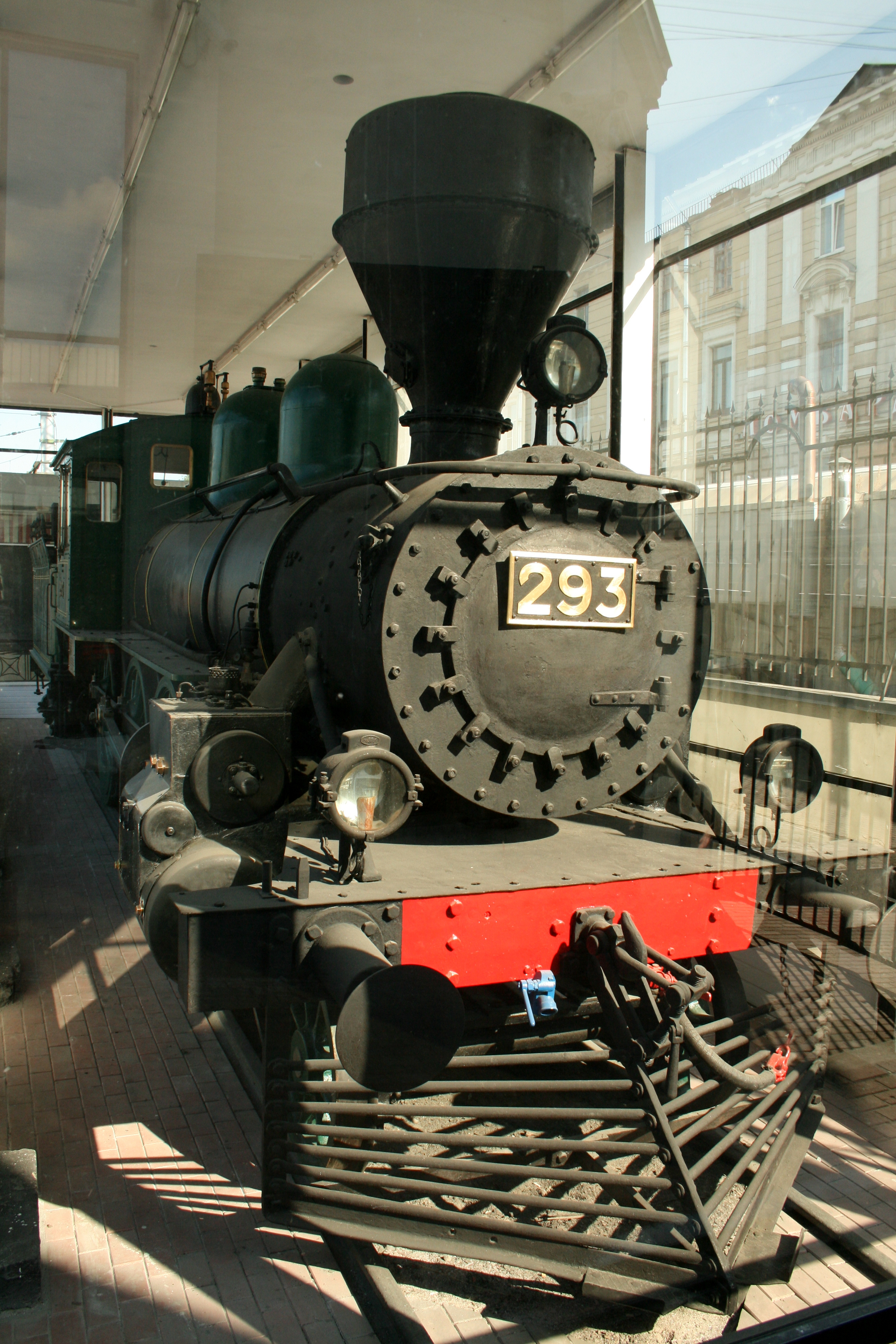
The engine that pulled the train on which Lenin arrived at Petrograd's Finland Station in April 1917 was not preserved. So Engine No. 293, by which Lenin escaped to Finland and then returned to Russia later in the year, serves as the permanent exhibit, installed at a platform on the station.

Arriving at Petrograd's Finland Station in April, Lenin gave a speech to Bolshevik supporters condemning the Provisional Government and again calling for a continent-wide European proletarian revolution. Over the following days, he spoke at Bolshevik meetings, lambasting those who wanted reconciliation with the Mensheviks and revealing his "April Theses", an outline of his plans for the Bolsheviks, which he had written on the journey from Switzerland. He publicly condemned both the Mensheviks and the Social Revolutionaries, who dominated the influential Petrograd Soviet, for supporting the Provisional Government, denouncing them as traitors to socialism. Considering the government to be just as imperialist as the Tsarist regime, he advocated immediate peace with Germany and Austria-Hungary, rule by soviets, the nationalisation of industry and banks, and the state expropriation of land, all with the intention of establishing a proletariat government and pushing toward a socialist society. By contrast, the Mensheviks believed that Russia was insufficiently developed to transition to socialism and accused Lenin of trying to plunge the new Republic into civil war. Over the coming months Lenin campaigned for his policies, attending the meetings of the Bolshevik Central Committee, prolifically writing for the Bolshevik newspaper Pravda, and giving public speeches in Petrograd aimed at converting workers, soldiers, sailors, and peasants to his cause.

Sensing growing frustration among Bolshevik supporters, Lenin suggested an armed political demonstration in Petrograd to test the government's response. Amid deteriorating health, he left the city to recuperate in the Finnish village of Neivola. The Bolsheviks' armed demonstration, the July Days, took place while Lenin was away, but upon learning that demonstrators had violently clashed with government forces, he returned to Petrograd and called for calm. Responding to the violence, the government ordered the arrest of Lenin and other prominent Bolsheviks, raiding their offices, and publicly alleging that he was a German agent provocateur. Evading arrest, Lenin hid in a series of Petrograd safe houses. Fearing that he would be killed, Lenin and fellow senior Bolshevik Grigory Zinoviev escaped Petrograd in disguise, relocating to Razliv. There, Lenin began work on the book that became The State and Revolution, an exposition on how he believed the proletarian state would develop after the proletariat revolution, and how from then on the state would gradually wither away, leaving a pure communist society. He began arguing for a Bolshevik-led armed insurrection to topple the government, but at a clandestine meeting of the party's central committee this idea was rejected. Lenin then headed by train and by foot to Finland, arriving at Helsinki on 10 August, where he hid away in safe houses belonging to Bolshevik sympathisers.

=== October Revolution: 1917 ===
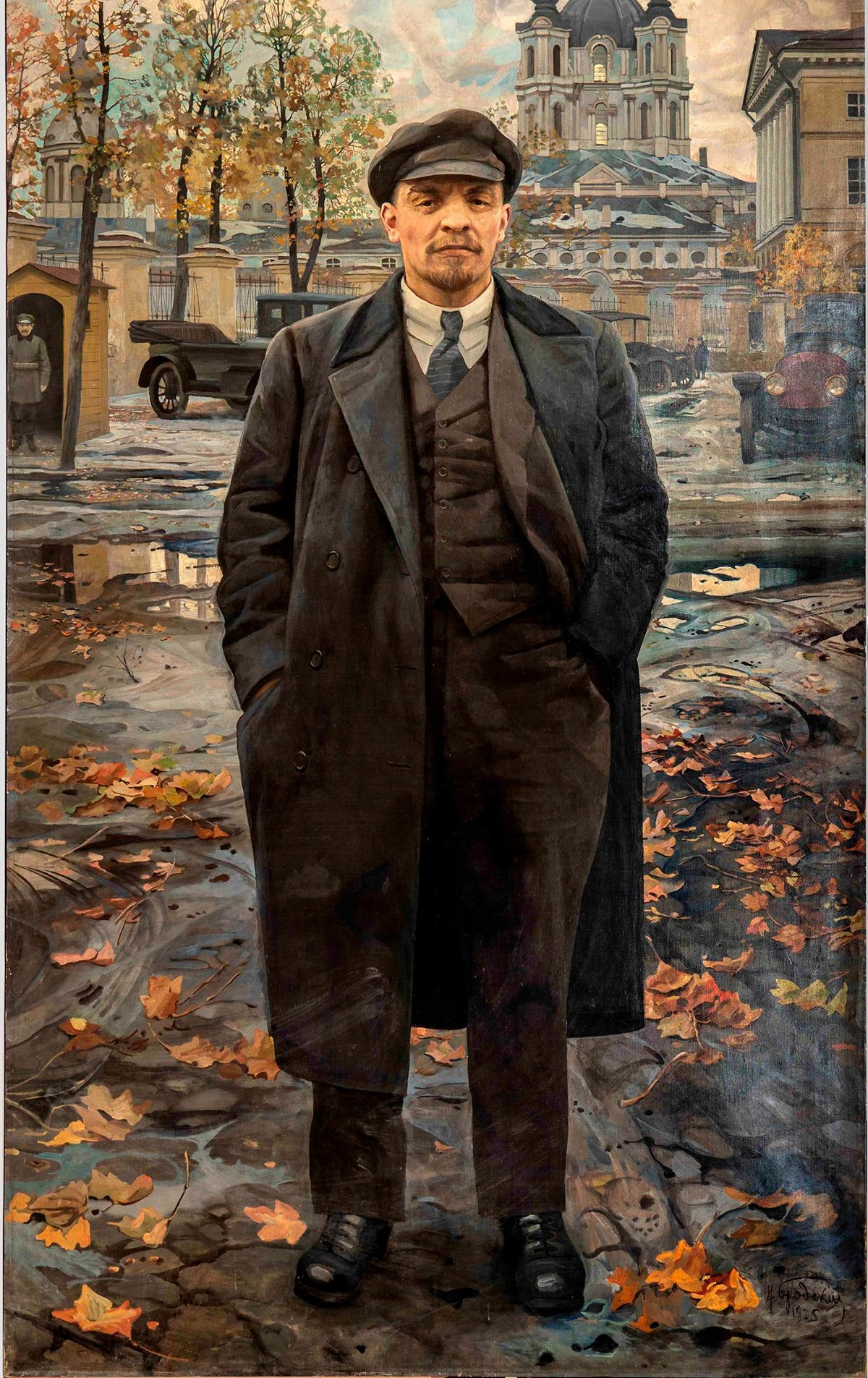
Painting of Lenin in front of the Smolny Institute by Isaak Brodsky

In August 1917, while Lenin was in Finland, General Lavr Kornilov, the commander-in-chief of the Russian Army, sent troops to Petrograd in what appeared to be a military coup attempt against the Provisional Government. Premier Alexander Kerensky turned to the Petrograd Soviet, including its Bolshevik members, for help, allowing the revolutionaries to organise workers as Red Guards to defend the city. The coup petered out before it reached Petrograd, but the events had allowed the Bolsheviks to return to the open political arena. Fearing a counter-revolution from right-wing forces hostile to socialism, the Mensheviks and Socialist-Revolutionaries who dominated the Petrograd Soviet had been instrumental in pressuring the government to normalise relations with the Bolsheviks. Both the Mensheviks and Socialist-Revolutionaries had lost much popular support because of their affiliation with the Provisional Government and its unpopular continuation of the war. The Bolsheviks capitalised on this, and soon the pro-Bolshevik Marxist Trotsky was elected leader of the Petrograd Soviet. In September, the Bolsheviks gained a majority in the workers' sections of both the Moscow and Petrograd Soviets.

Recognising that the situation was safer for him, Lenin returned to Petrograd. There he attended a meeting of the Bolshevik Central Committee on 10 October, where he again argued that the party should lead an armed insurrection to topple the Provisional Government. This time the argument won with ten votes against two. Critics of the plan, Zinoviev and Kamenev, argued that Russian workers would not support a violent coup against the regime and that there was no clear evidence for Lenin's assertion that all of Europe was on the verge of proletarian revolution. The party began plans to organise the offensive, holding a final meeting at the Smolny Institute on 24 October. This was the base of the Military Revolutionary Committee (MRC), an armed militia largely loyal to the Bolsheviks that had been established by the Petrograd Soviet during Kornilov's alleged coup.

In October, the MRC was ordered to take control of Petrograd's key transport, communication, printing and utilities hubs, and did so without bloodshed. Bolsheviks besieged the government in the Winter Palace and overcame it and arrested its ministers after the cruiser Aurora, controlled by Bolshevik seamen, fired a blank shot to signal the start of the revolution. During the insurrection, Lenin gave a speech to the Petrograd Soviet announcing that the Provisional Government had been overthrown. The Bolsheviks declared the formation of a new government, the Council of People's Commissars, or Sovnarkom. Lenin initially turned down the leading position of Chairman, suggesting Trotsky for the job, but other Bolsheviks insisted and ultimately Lenin relented. Lenin and other Bolsheviks then attended the Second Congress of Soviets on 26 and 27 October and announced the creation of the new government. Menshevik attendees condemned the illegitimate seizure of power and the risk of civil war. In the early days of the regime, Lenin adjusted his rhetoric so as not to alienate Russia's population, and spoke about having a country controlled by the workers and power to the Soviets. Lenin and many other Bolsheviks expected proletariat revolution to sweep across Europe in days or months.

== Lenin's government ==
=== Organising the Soviet government: 1917–1918 ===
The Provisional Government had planned for a Constituent Assembly to be elected in November 1917; despite Lenin's objections, Sovnarkom allowed the vote as scheduled. In the election, the Bolsheviks gained about a quarter of the vote, losing to the agrarian-focused Socialist-Revolutionaries. Lenin argued that the election did not reflect the people's will, claiming the electorate was unaware of the Bolsheviks' programme, and that candidacy lists were outdated, having been drawn up before the Left Socialist-Revolutionaries split from the Socialist-Revolutionaries. Nevertheless, the newly elected Russian Constituent Assembly convened in Petrograd in January 1918. Sovnarkom claimed it was counter-revolutionary because it sought to remove power from the soviets, but the Socialist-Revolutionaries and Mensheviks denied this. The Bolsheviks presented a motion to strip the Assembly of most of its legal powers; when the Assembly rejected this, Sovnarkom declared it counter-revolutionary and forcibly disbanded it.

Lenin rejected repeated calls, including from some Bolsheviks, to establish a coalition government with other socialist parties. Though Sovnarkom refused a coalition with the Mensheviks or Socialist-Revolutionaries, it allowed the Left Socialist-Revolutionaries five cabinet posts in December 1917. This coalition lasted only until March 1918, when the Left Socialist-Revolutionaries left the government over disagreements about the Bolsheviks' approach to ending the First World War. At their 7th Congress in March 1918, the Bolsheviks changed their name from the Russian Social Democratic Labour Party to the Russian Communist Party, as Lenin wanted to distance his group from the increasingly reformist German Social Democratic Party and emphasize its goal of a communist society.

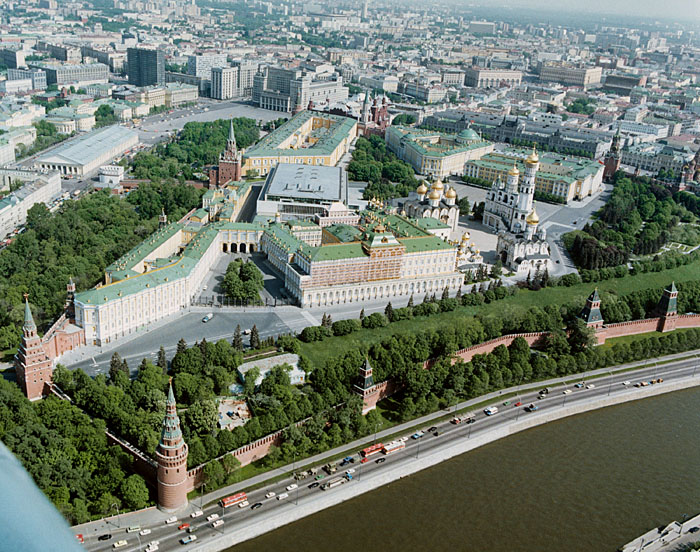
The Moscow Kremlin, which Lenin moved into in 1918 (pictured in 1987)

Although ultimate power officially rested with Sovnarkom and the Executive Committee (VTSIK) elected by the All-Russian Congress of Soviets (ARCS), the Communist Party was de facto in control of Russia, as acknowledged by its members at the time. By 1918, Sovnarkom began acting unilaterally, citing a need for expediency, with the ARCS and VTSIK becoming increasingly marginalized, so the soviets no longer had a role in governing Russia. During 1918 and 1919, the government expelled Mensheviks and Socialist-Revolutionaries from the soviets. Russia had become a one-party state.

Within the party, a Political Bureau (Politburo) and Organisation Bureau (Orgburo) were established to accompany the existing Central Committee; decisions of these bodies had to be adopted by Sovnarkom and the Council of Labour and Defence. Lenin was the most significant figure in this governance structure, being Chairman of Sovnarkom and sitting on the Council of Labour and Defence, the Central Committee, and the Politburo. The only individual with comparable influence was Lenin's right-hand man, Yakov Sverdlov, who died in March 1919 as a result of the Spanish flu pandemic. In November 1917, Lenin and his wife took a two-room flat within the Smolny Institute; the following month, they went on a brief holiday in Halila, Finland. In January 1918, he survived an assassination attempt in Petrograd; Fritz Platten, who was with Lenin at the time, shielded him and was injured by a bullet.

Concerned by Petrograd's vulnerability to German attack, Sovnarkom began relocating to Moscow in March 1918. Lenin, Trotsky, and other Bolshevik leaders moved into the Kremlin.

On 30 August, Fanny Kaplan, a former SR, attempted to assassinate Lenin with a pistol in the street outside the Hammer and Sickle arms factory, where he had just given a speech. Lenin was severely wounded by two bullets. Though he recovered, his health was permanently affected. Kaplan was captured immediately. She stated that she supported the Constituent Assembly and considered Lenin a traitor to the Revolution. She was summarily executed on 3 September.

=== Social, legal, and economic reform: 1917–1918 ===
To All Workers, Soldiers and Peasants. The Soviet authority will at once propose a democratic peace to all nations and an immediate armistice on all fronts. It will safeguard the transfer without compensation of all land—landlord, imperial, and monastery—to the peasants' committees; it will defend the soldiers' rights, introducing a complete democratisation of the army; it will establish workers' control over industry; it will ensure the convocation of the Constituent Assembly on the date set; it will supply the cities with bread and the villages with articles of first necessity; and it will secure to all nationalities inhabiting Russia the right of self-determination ... Long live the revolution!

— Lenin's political programme, October 1917

Upon taking power, Lenin's regime issued several decrees. The first was the Decree on Land, nationalizing the landed estates of the aristocracy and the Orthodox Church for redistribution to peasants by local governments. This contrasted with Lenin's preference for agricultural collectivisation but acknowledged the widespread peasant land seizures that had already taken place. In November 1917, the government issued the Decree on the Press, closing opposition media outlets deemed counter-revolutionary. Although claimed to be temporary, the decree faced criticism, including from Bolsheviks, for undermining freedom of the press.

In November 1917, Lenin issued the Declaration of the Rights of the Peoples of Russia, granting non-Russian ethnic groups the right to secede and form independent nation-states. Many declared independence (Finland, Lithuania in December 1917, Latvia and Ukraine in January 1918, Estonia in February 1918, Transcaucasia in April 1918, and Poland in November 1918). The Bolsheviks then promoted communist parties in these new states, while at the Fifth All-Russian Congress of the Soviets in July 1918, a constitution reformed the Russian Republic into the Russian Soviet Federative Socialist Republic. The government also switched from the Julian calendar to the Gregorian calendar, aligning Russia with Europe.

In November 1917, Sovnarkom abolished Russia's legal system, replacing it with "revolutionary conscience". Courts were replaced by Revolutionary Tribunals for counter-revolutionary crimes, and People's Courts for civil and criminal cases, instructed to follow Sovnarkom decrees and a "socialist sense of justice". November also saw the military restructured with egalitarian measures, abolition of previous ranks, titles, and medals, and the establishment of soldiers' committees to elect commanders.

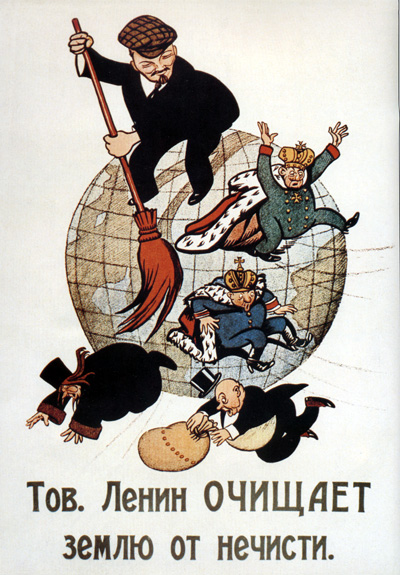
Bolshevik propaganda poster from 1920, with a political cartoon depicting Lenin sweeping away monarchs, clergy, and capitalists. The caption reads "Comrade Lenin Cleanses the Earth of Filth".

In October 1917, Lenin decreed an eight-hour workday for all Russians. He also issued the Decree on Popular Education, guaranteeing free, secular education for all children, and a decree establishing state orphanages. A literacy campaign was launched to combat mass illiteracy, with an estimated 5 million people enrolling in courses from 1920 to 1926. Embracing gender equality, laws were passed to emancipate women, giving them economic autonomy and easing divorce restrictions. The Zhenotdel was established to promote these aims. Lenin's Russia became the first country to legalize first-trimester abortion on demand. The regime was militantly atheist, seeking to dismantle organized religion. In January 1918, the government decreed the separation of church and state and banned religious instruction in schools.

In November 1917, Lenin issued the Decree on Workers' Control, calling on workers to form elected committees to monitor their enterprise's management. That month, Sovnarkom also requisitioned the country's gold, and nationalised banks, viewing this as a key step toward socialism. In December, Sovnarkom established the Supreme Council of the National Economy (VSNKh), overseeing industry, banking, agriculture, and trade. The factory committees were subordinated to trade unions, which were in turn subordinate to VSNKh, prioritising the state's central economic plan over local workers' interests. In early 1918, Sovnarkom cancelled all foreign debts and refused to pay interest. In April 1918, it nationalized foreign trade, establishing a state monopoly on imports and exports. In June 1918, it nationalised public utilities, railways, engineering, textiles, metallurgy, and mining, though often only in name. Full-scale nationalisation did not occur until November 1920, when small-scale industrial enterprises were brought under state control.

The Left Communists criticized Sovnarkom's economic policy as too moderate, advocating for the immediate nationalisation of all industry, agriculture, trade, finance, transport, and communication. Lenin deemed this impractical and argued for the nationalisation of only large-scale capitalist enterprises, allowing smaller businesses to operate privately until they could be successfully nationalised. Lenin also opposed the Left Communists' syndicalist approach, arguing in June 1918 for centralised economic control, rather than factory-level worker control.

Both Left Communists and other Communist Party factions critiqued the decline of democratic institutions in Russia from a left-libertarian perspective. Internationally, many socialists condemned Lenin's regime, highlighting the lack of widespread political participation, popular consultation, and industrial democracy. In late 1918, Czech-Austrian Marxist Karl Kautsky authored an anti-Leninist pamphlet criticising Soviet Russia's anti-democratic nature, to which Lenin responded with The Proletarian Revolution and the Renegade Kautsky. German Marxist Rosa Luxemburg echoed Kautsky's views, while Russian anarchist Peter Kropotkin described the Bolshevik seizure of power as "the burial of the Russian Revolution".

=== Treaty of Brest-Litovsk: 1917–1918 ===
[By prolonging the war] we unusually strengthen German imperialism, and the peace will have to be concluded anyway, but then the peace will be worse because it will be concluded by someone other than ourselves. No doubt the peace which we are now being forced to conclude is an indecent peace, but if war commences our government will be swept away and the peace will be concluded by another government.

— Lenin on peace with the Central Powers

Upon taking power, Lenin believed that a key policy of his government must be to withdraw from the First World War by establishing an armistice with the Central Powers of Germany and Austria-Hungary. He believed that ongoing war would create resentment among war-weary Russian troops, to whom he had promised peace, and that these troops and the advancing German Army threatened both his own government and the cause of international socialism. By contrast, other Bolsheviks, in particular Nikolai Bukharin and the Left Communists, believed that peace with the Central Powers would be a betrayal of international socialism and that Russia should instead wage "a war of revolutionary defence" that would provoke an uprising of the German proletariat against their own government.

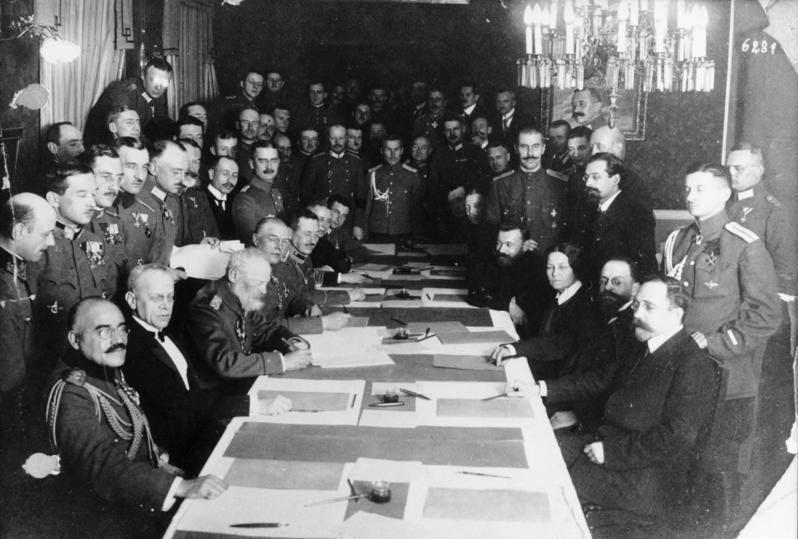
Signing of the armistice between Russia and Germany on 15 December 1917

Lenin proposed a three-month armistice in his Decree on Peace of November 1917, which was approved by the Second Congress of Soviets and presented to the German and Austro-Hungarian governments. The Germans responded positively, viewing this as an opportunity to focus on the Western Front and stave off looming defeat. In November, armistice talks began at Brest-Litovsk, the headquarters of the German high command on the Eastern Front, with the Russian delegation being led by Trotsky and Adolph Joffe. Meanwhile, a ceasefire until January was agreed. During negotiations, the Germans insisted on keeping their wartime conquests, which included Poland, Lithuania, and Courland, whereas the Russians countered that this was a violation of these nations' rights to self-determination. Some Bolsheviks had expressed hopes of dragging out negotiations until proletarian revolution broke out throughout Europe. On 7 January 1918, Trotsky returned from Brest-Litovsk to Saint Petersburg with an ultimatum from the Central Powers: either Russia accept Germany's territorial demands or the war would resume.

In January and again in February, Lenin urged the Bolsheviks to accept Germany's proposals. He argued that the territorial losses were acceptable if it ensured the survival of the Bolshevik-led government. The majority of Bolsheviks rejected his position, hoping to prolong the armistice and call Germany's bluff. On 18 February, the German Army launched Operation Faustschlag, advancing further into Russian-controlled territory and conquering Dvinsk within a day. At this point, Lenin finally convinced a small majority of the Bolshevik Central Committee to accept the Central Powers' demands. On 23 February, the Central Powers issued a new ultimatum: Russia had to recognise German control not only of Poland and the Baltic states but also of Ukraine or face a full-scale invasion.

On 3 March, the Treaty of Brest-Litovsk was signed. It resulted in massive territorial losses for Russia, with 26% of the former Empire's population, 37% of its agricultural harvest area, 28% of its industry, 26% of its railway tracks, and three-quarters of its coal and iron deposits being transferred to German control. Accordingly, the Treaty was deeply unpopular across Russia's political spectrum, and several Bolsheviks and Left Socialist-Revolutionaries resigned from Sovnarkom in protest. In August 1918, with his government threatened by Allied intervention and the anti-Bolshevik armies, Lenin had Georgy Chicherin ask the German ambassador for "parallel action" against both. On 27 August, Soviet Russia signed a supplementary treaty with Germany, renouncing Estonia and Livonia and agreeing to pay six billion marks in reparations; secret clauses provided for German military action against Allied forces on Russian soil. The historian Stephen Kotkin writes that whereas the rumoured treason of the tsarist court to Germany during 1914–1917 had never been real, the Bolsheviks' capitulation to Germany in 1918 was "all too real". Lenin justified the arrangement in a handwritten letter to the Bolshevik envoy in Sweden: "There was a coincidence of interests. We would have been idiots not to have exploited it." After the Treaty, Sovnarkom focused on trying to foment proletarian revolution in Germany, issuing an array of anti-war and anti-government publications in the country; the German government retaliated by expelling Russia's diplomats. The Treaty nevertheless failed to stop the Central Powers' defeat; in November 1918, the German emperor Wilhelm II abdicated and the country's new administration signed the Armistice with the Allies. As a result, Sovnarkom proclaimed the Treaty of Brest-Litovsk void.

=== Anti-Kulak campaigns, Cheka, and Red Terror: 1918–1922 ===
[The bourgeoisie] practised terror against the workers, soldiers and peasants in the interests of a small group of landowners and bankers, whereas the Soviet regime applies decisive measures against landowners, plunderers and their accomplices in the interests of the workers, soldiers and peasants.

— Lenin on the Red Terror

By early 1918, many cities in western Russia faced famine as a result of chronic food shortages. Lenin blamed this on the kulaks, or wealthier peasants, who allegedly hoarded the grain that they had produced to increase its financial value. In May 1918, he issued a requisitioning order that established armed detachments to confiscate grain from kulaks for distribution in the cities, and in June called for the formation of Committees of Poor Peasants to aid in requisitioning. This policy resulted in vast social disorder and violence, as armed detachments often clashed with peasant groups, helping to set the stage for the civil war. A prominent example of Lenin's views was his August 1918 telegram to the Bolsheviks of Penza, which called upon them to suppress a peasant insurrection by publicly hanging at least 100 "known kulaks, rich men, [and] bloodsuckers".

The requisitions disincentivised peasants from producing more grain than they could personally consume, and thus production slumped. A booming black market supplemented the official state-sanctioned economy, and Lenin called on speculators, black marketeers and looters to be shot. Both the Socialist-Revolutionaries and Left Socialist-Revolutionaries condemned the armed appropriations of grain at the Fifth All-Russian Congress of Soviets in July 1918. Realising that the Committees of the Poor Peasants were also persecuting peasants who were not kulaks and thus contributing to anti-government feeling among the peasantry, in December 1918 Lenin abolished them.

Lenin repeatedly emphasised the need for terror and violence in overthrowing the old order and ensuring the success of the revolution. Speaking to the All-Russian Central Executive Committee of the Soviets in November 1917, he declared that "the state is an institution built up for the sake of exercising violence. Previously, this violence was exercised by a handful of moneybags over the entire people; now we want [...] to organise violence in the interests of the people." He strongly opposed suggestions to abolish capital punishment. Fearing anti-Bolshevik forces would overthrow his administration, in December 1917 Lenin ordered the establishment of the Emergency Commission for Combating Counter-Revolution and Sabotage, or Cheka, a political police force led by Felix Dzerzhinsky.

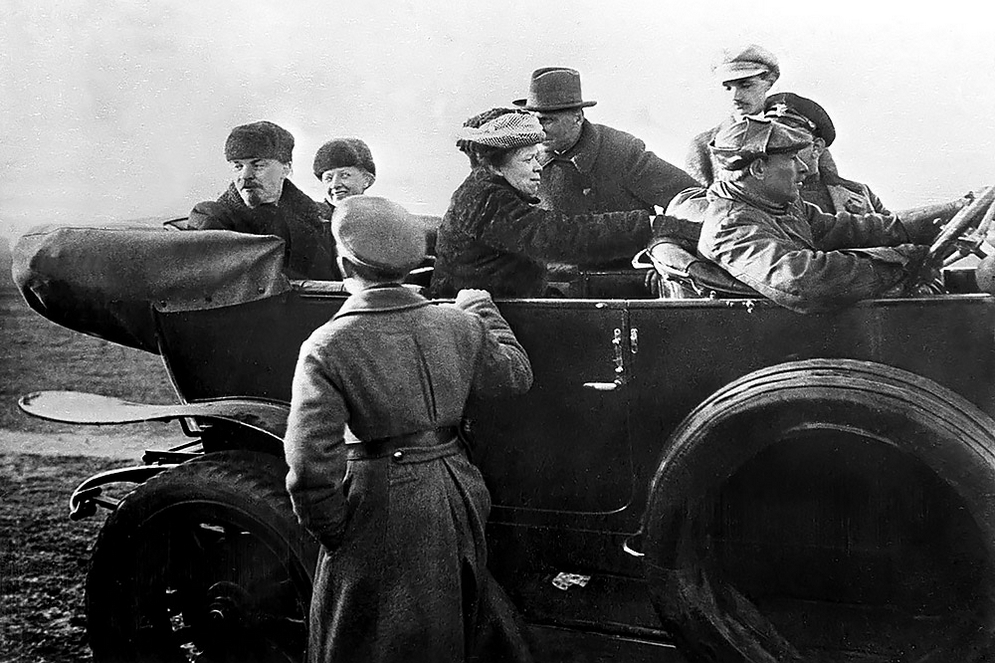
Lenin with his wife and sister in a car at a Red Army parade at Khodynka Field in Moscow, May Day 1918

In September 1918, Sovnarkom passed a decree that inaugurated the Red Terror, a system of repression orchestrated by the Cheka secret police. Although sometimes described as an attempt to eliminate the entire bourgeoisie, Lenin did not want to exterminate all members of this class, merely those who sought to reinstate their rule. The majority of the Terror's victims were well-to-do citizens or former members of the Tsarist administration; others were non-bourgeois anti-Bolsheviks and perceived social undesirables such as prostitutes. The Cheka claimed the right to execute anyone whom it deemed to be an enemy of the government, without recourse to the Revolutionary Tribunals. Accordingly, throughout Soviet Russia the Cheka carried out killings, often in large numbers. There are no surviving records to provide an accurate figure of how many perished in the Red Terror; later estimates of historians have ranged between 10,000 and 15,000, and 50,000 to 140,000.

Lenin never witnessed this violence or participated in it first-hand, and publicly distanced himself from it. His published articles and speeches rarely called for executions, but he regularly did so in his coded telegrams and confidential notes. Many Bolsheviks expressed disapproval of the Cheka's mass executions and feared the organisation's apparent unaccountability. The Communist Party tried to restrain its activities in February 1919, stripping it of its powers of tribunal and execution in those areas not under official martial law, but the Cheka continued as before in swathes of the country. By 1920, the Cheka had become the most powerful institution in Soviet Russia, exerting influence over all other state apparatus.

A decree in April 1919 resulted in the establishment of concentration camps, which were entrusted to the Cheka, later administered by a new government agency, Gulag. By the end of 1920, 84 camps had been established across Soviet Russia, holding about 50,000 prisoners; by October 1923, this had grown to 315 camps and about 70,000 inmates. Those interned in the camps were used as slave labour. From July 1922, intellectuals deemed to be opposing the Bolshevik government were exiled to inhospitable regions or deported from Russia altogether; Lenin personally scrutinised the lists of those to be dealt with in this manner. In May 1922, Lenin issued a decree calling for the execution of anti-Bolshevik priests, causing between 14,000 and 20,000 deaths. The Russian Orthodox Church was worst affected; the government's anti-religious policies also harmed Catholic and Protestant churches, Jewish synagogues, and Islamic mosques.

=== Civil War and the Polish–Soviet War: 1918–1920 ===
The existence of the Soviet Republic alongside the imperialist states over the long run is unthinkable. In the end, either the one or the other will triumph. And until that end will have arrived, a series of the most terrible conflicts between the Soviet Republic and the bourgeois governments is unavoidable. This means that the ruling class, the proletariat, if it only wishes to rule and is to rule, must demonstrate this also with its military organization.

— Lenin on war

Lenin expected Russia's aristocracy and bourgeoisie to oppose his government but believed that the numerical superiority of the lower classes, coupled with the Bolsheviks' organizational skills, would ensure a swift victory. He did not anticipate the intensity of the violent opposition that ensued. The resulting Russian Civil War (1917–1923) pitted the Bolshevik Red Army against the anti-Bolshevik Whites, with the Reds ultimately emerging victorious. The conflict also included ethnic clashes and anti-Bolshevik peasant and left-wing uprisings across the former Empire. Historians often view the civil war as two conflicts: one between revolutionaries and counter-revolutionaries, and another among different revolutionary factions.

The White armies were formed by former Tsarist officers, including Anton Denikin's Volunteer Army in South Russia, Alexander Kolchak's forces in Siberia, and Nikolai Yudenich's troops in the Baltic states. The Whites gained support from 35,000 members of the Czech Legion, who allied with the Committee of Members of the Constituent Assembly (Komuch), an anti-Bolshevik government in Samara. Western governments, angered by the Treaty of Brest-Litovsk and fearing Bolshevik calls for world revolution, also backed the Whites. In 1918, Britain, France, the U.S., Canada, Italy, and Serbia landed 10,000 troops in Murmansk and Kandalaksha, while British, US, and Japanese forces landed in Vladivostok. Western troops soon withdrew, offering only material support, but Japan remained, seeking territorial gains.

Lenin tasked Trotsky with forming the Red Army, with Trotsky organizing a Revolutionary Military Council in September 1918 and serving as chairman until 1925. Lenin allowed former Tsarist officers to serve in the Red Army, monitored by military councils. The Reds controlled Moscow, Petrograd, and most of Great Russia, while the Whites were fragmented and geographically scattered on the peripheries. The Whites' Russian supremacism alienated national minorities. The White Terror was more spontaneous than the state-sanctioned Red Terror. Antisemitism proved to be a major issue during the Civil War, and while both sides attacked Jewish communities (see Pogroms during the Russian Civil War), the Whites successfully used antisemitism in anti-Bolshevik propaganda by blaming the Jews for the revolution and the alleged conspiracy behind it. Lenin, in his turn, blamed capitalists for inflaming antisemitism and condemned it in general.

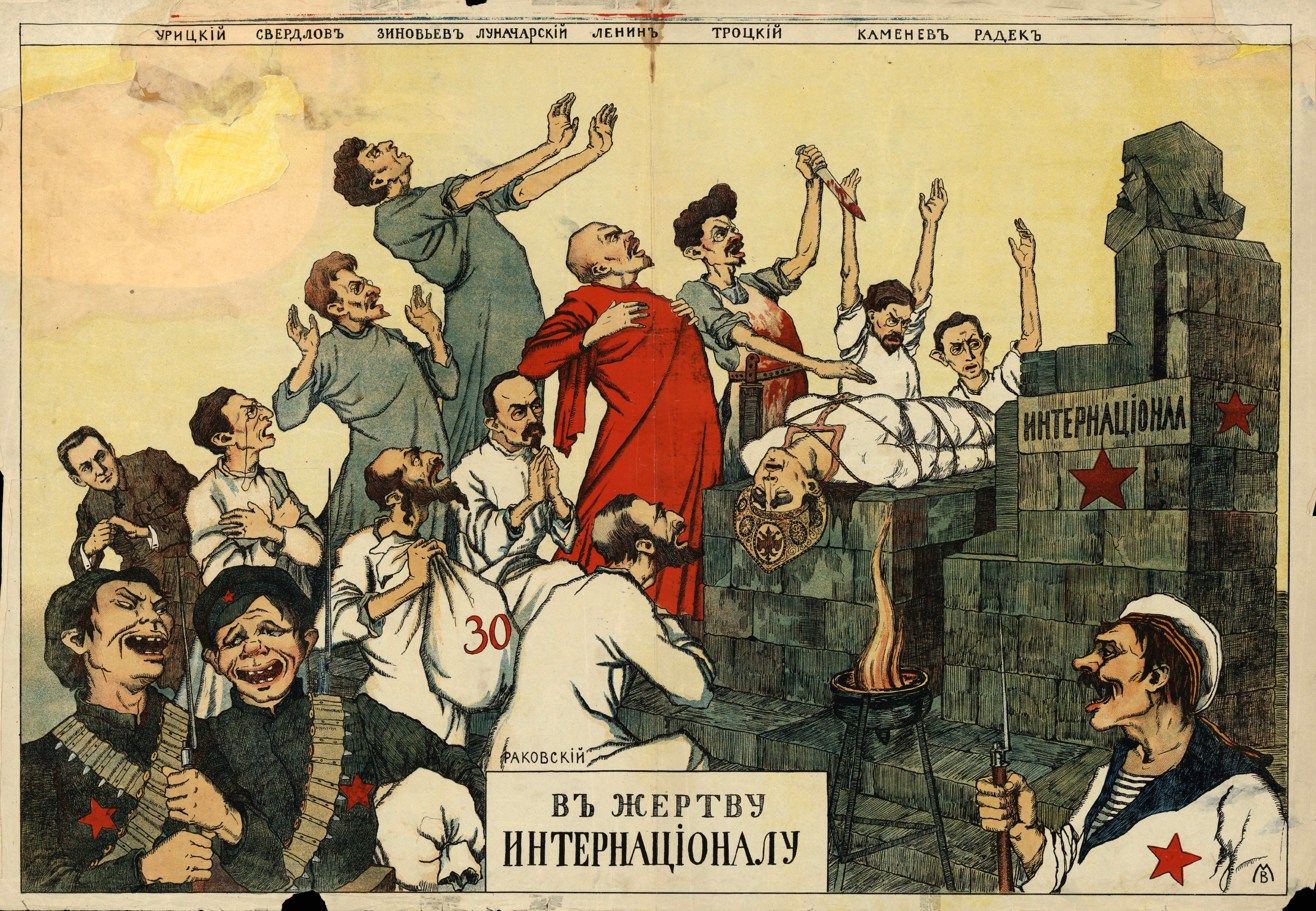
White anti-Bolshevik propaganda poster, depicting Lenin aiding Bolsheviks in sacrificing Russia to a statue of Marx, c. 1918–1919

In July 1918, Sverdlov informed Sovnarkom that the Ural Regional Soviet had overseen the execution of the former Tsar and his family in Yekaterinburg to prevent their rescue by White troops. Some historians believe Lenin sanctioned the killings, while others, like James Ryan, argue there is "no reason" to believe so. Lenin viewed the execution as necessary, likening it to the execution of Louis XVI during the French Revolution.

After the Brest-Litovsk Treaty, the Left Socialist-Revolutionaries saw the Bolsheviks as traitors. In July 1918, the Left Socialist-Revolutionary Yakov Blumkin assassinated German ambassador Wilhelm von Mirbach to provoke a revolutionary war against Germany. They then launched a coup in Moscow, shelling the Kremlin and seizing the central post office before Trotsky's forces suppressed them. The party's leaders were arrested but treated more leniently than other Bolshevik opponents.

By 1919, the White armies were in retreat, and by 1920, they were defeated on all fronts. The Russian state's territorial extent was reduced as non-Russian ethnic groups sought national independence. In March 1921, during the Polish–Soviet War, the Peace of Riga split disputed territories in Belarus and Ukraine between Poland and Soviet Russia. Soviet Russia aimed to re-conquer newly independent nations but had limited success. Estonia, Finland, Latvia, and Lithuania repelled Soviet invasions, while Ukraine, Belarus (as a result of the Polish–Soviet War), Armenia, Azerbaijan, and Georgia were occupied by the Red Army. By 1921, Soviet Russia had defeated the Ukrainian national movements and occupied the Caucasus, though anti-Bolshevik uprisings in Central Asia persisted into the late 1920s.

Following the Armistice and the withdrawal of German Ober Ost garrisons, Soviet and Polish armies moved to fill the vacuum. Both Soviet Russia and the new Polish state sought territorial expansion. Polish and Russian troops first clashed in February 1919, escalating into the Polish–Soviet War. Unlike previous conflicts, this war had significant implications for the export of revolution and Europe's future. Polish forces advanced into Ukraine, taking Kiev by May 1920. After forcing the Polish Army back, Lenin urged the Red Army to invade Poland, expecting a proletarian uprising that would ignite a European revolution. Despite scepticism from Trotsky and others, the invasion proceeded, but the Polish proletariat did not rise, and the Red Army was defeated at the Battle of Warsaw. The Polish Army pushed the Red Army back into Russia, forcing Sovnarkom to sue for peace, culminating in the Peace of Riga, where Russia ceded territory to Poland.

=== Comintern and world revolution: 1919–1920 ===
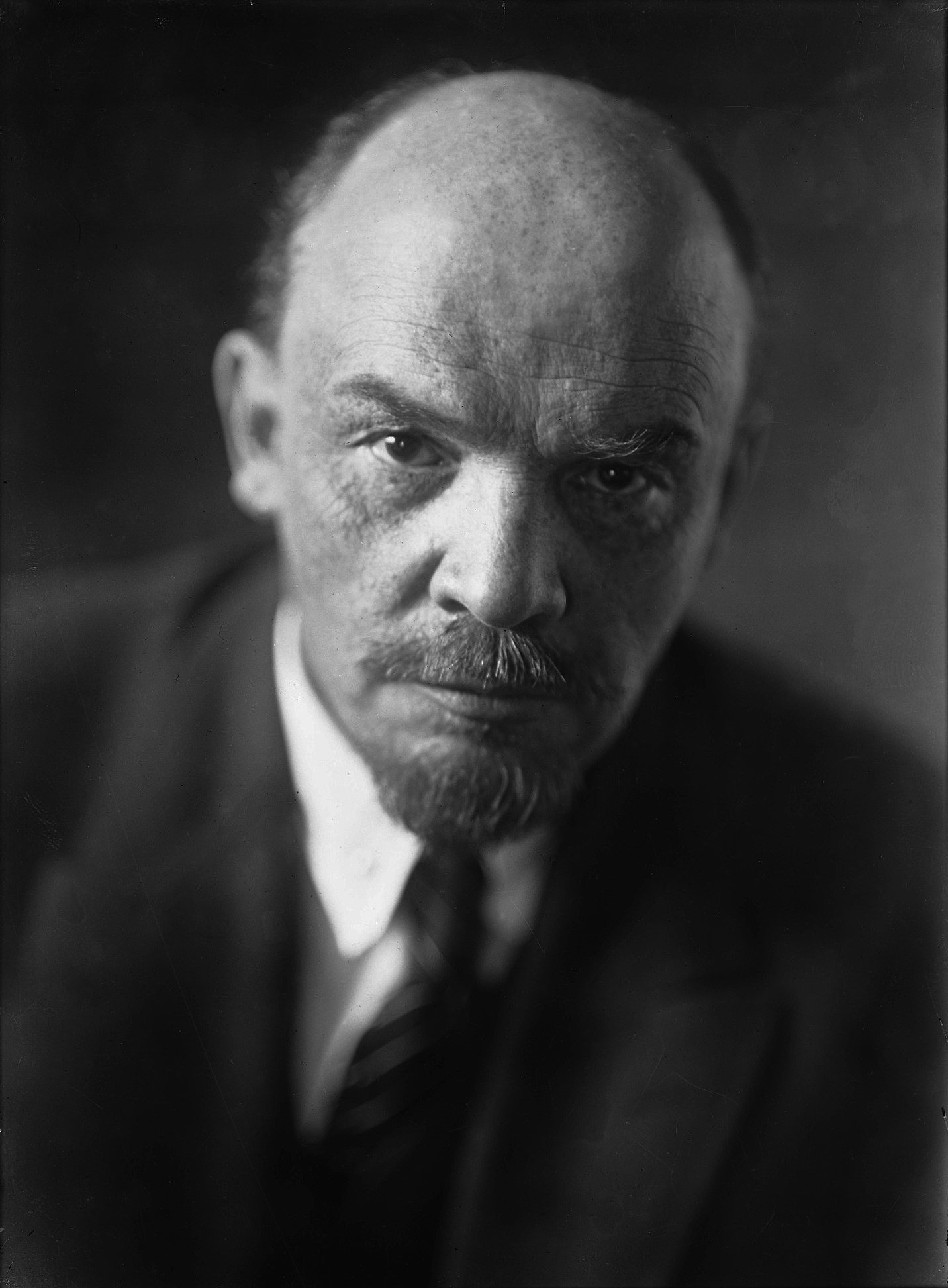
Lenin in July 1920

After the Armistice on the Western Front, Lenin believed that the breakout of the European revolution was imminent. Seeking to promote this, Sovnarkom supported the establishment of Béla Kun's Hungarian Soviet Republic in March 1919, followed by the soviet government in Bavaria and various revolutionary socialist uprisings in other parts of Germany, including that of the Spartacus League. During Russia's Civil War, the Red Army was sent into the newly independent national republics on Russia's borders to aid Marxists there in establishing soviet systems of government. In Europe, this resulted in the creation of new communist-led states in Estonia, Latvia, Lithuania, Belarus, and Ukraine, all of which were nominally independent from Russia but in fact controlled from Moscow, while further east it led to the creation of communist governments in Outer Mongolia. Various senior Bolsheviks wanted these absorbed into the Russian state; Lenin insisted that national sensibilities should be respected, but reassured his comrades that these nations' new Communist Party administrations were under the de facto authority of Sovnarkom.

In late 1918, the British Labour Party called for the establishment of an international conference of socialist parties, the Labour and Socialist International. Lenin saw this as a revival of the Second International, which he had despised, and formulated his own rival international socialist conference to offset its impact. Organised with the aid of Zinoviev, Nikolai Bukharin, Trotsky, Christian Rakovsky, and Angelica Balabanoff, the First Congress of this Communist International (Comintern) opened in Moscow in March 1919. It lacked global coverage; most of the delegates resided within the countries of the former Russian Empire, and most of the international delegates were not recognised by any socialist parties in their own nations. Accordingly, the Bolsheviks dominated proceedings, with Lenin subsequently authoring a series of regulations that meant that only socialist parties endorsing the Bolsheviks' views were permitted to join Comintern. During the first conference, Lenin spoke to the delegates, lambasting the parliamentary path to socialism espoused by revisionist Marxists like Kautsky and repeating his calls for a violent overthrow of Europe's bourgeoisie governments. While Zinoviev became the Comintern's president, Lenin retained significant influence over it.

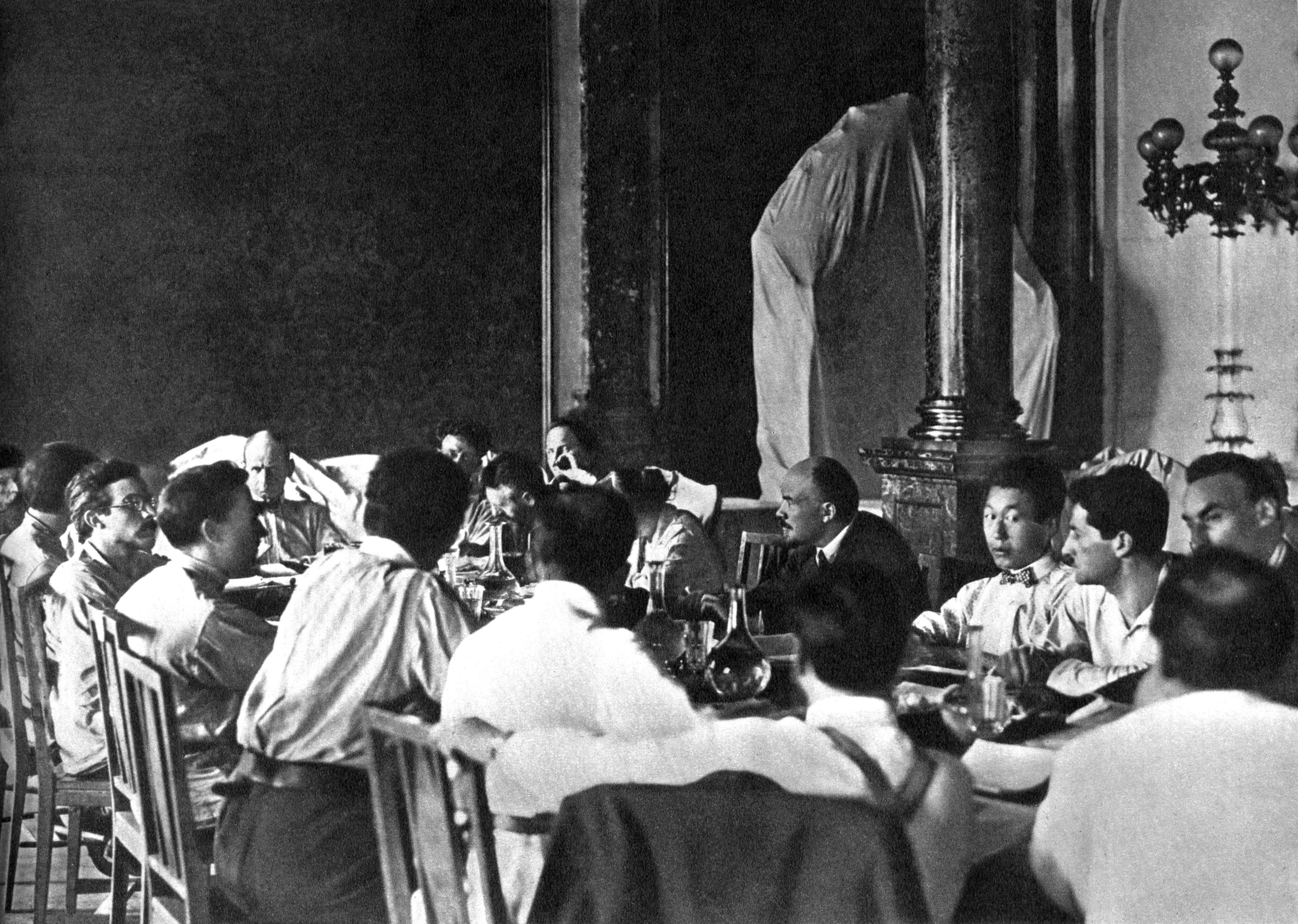
Lenin in one of the committees of the II Congress of the Comintern

The Second Congress of the Communist International opened in Petrograd's Smolny Institute in July 1920, representing the last time that Lenin visited a city other than Moscow. There, he encouraged foreign delegates to emulate the Bolsheviks' seizure of power and abandoned his longstanding viewpoint that capitalism was a necessary stage in societal development, instead, encouraging those nations under colonial occupation to transform their pre-capitalist societies directly into socialist ones. For this conference, he authored "Left-Wing" Communism: An Infantile Disorder, a short book articulating his criticism of elements within the British and German Communist parties who refused to enter their nations' parliamentary systems and trade unions; instead, he urged them to do so to advance the revolutionary cause. The conference had to be suspended for several days due to the ongoing war with Poland, and was relocated to Moscow, where it continued to hold sessions until August. Lenin's predicted world revolution did not materialise, as the Hungarian Communist government was overthrown, and the German Marxist uprisings suppressed.

=== Famine and the New Economic Policy: 1920–1922 ===
Within the Communist Party, there was dissent from two factions, the Group of Democratic Centralism and the Workers' Opposition, both of which accused the Russian state of being too centralised and bureaucratic. The Workers' Opposition, which had connections to the official state trade unions, also expressed the concern that the government had lost the trust of the Russian working class. They were angered by Trotsky's suggestion that the trade unions be eliminated. He deemed the unions to be superfluous in a "workers' state", but Lenin disagreed, believing it best to retain them; most Bolsheviks embraced Lenin's view in the 'trade union discussion'. To deal with the dissent, at the Tenth Party Congress in February 1921, Lenin introduced a ban on factional activity within the party, under pain of expulsion.

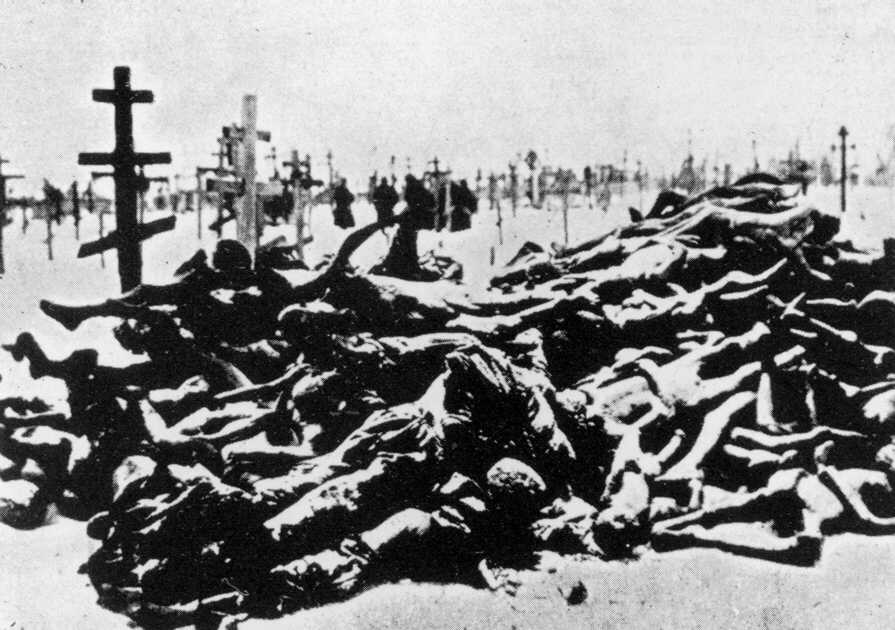
Victims of the famine in Buzuluk, Orenburg Oblast, winter 1921/1922

Caused in part by a drought, the Russian famine of 1921 resulted in around five million deaths. The famine was exacerbated by government requisitioning, as well as the export of large quantities of Russian grain. To aid the famine victims, the US government established the American Relief Administration to distribute food; Lenin was suspicious of this aid and had it closely monitored. During the famine, Patriarch Tikhon called on Orthodox churches to sell unnecessary items to help feed the starving, an action endorsed by the government. In February 1922, Sovnarkom went further by calling on all valuables belonging to religious institutions to be forcibly appropriated and sold. Tikhon opposed the sale of items used within the Eucharist and many clergy resisted the appropriations, resulting in violence.

In 1920 and 1921, local opposition to requisitioning resulted in anti-Bolshevik peasant uprisings breaking out across Russia, which were suppressed. Among the most significant was the Tambov Rebellion, which was put down by the Red Army. In February 1921, workers went on strike in Petrograd, resulting in the government proclaiming martial law in the city and sending in the Red Army to quell demonstrations. In March, the Kronstadt rebellion began when sailors in Kronstadt revolted against the Bolshevik government, demanding that all socialists be allowed to publish freely, that independent trade unions be given freedom of assembly and that peasants be allowed free markets and not be subject to requisitioning. Lenin declared that the mutineers had been misled by the Socialist-Revolutionaries and foreign imperialists, calling for violent reprisals. Under Trotsky's leadership, the Red Army put down the rebellion on 17 March, resulting in thousands of deaths and the internment of survivors in labour camps.

You must attempt first to build small bridges which shall lead to a land of small peasant holdings through State Capitalism to Socialism. Otherwise you will never lead tens of millions of people to Communism. This is what the objective forces of the development of the Revolution have taught.

— Lenin on the NEP, 1921

In February 1921, Lenin introduced a New Economic Policy (NEP) to the Politburo; he convinced most senior Bolsheviks of its necessity and it passed into law in April. Lenin explained the policy in a booklet, On the Food Tax, in which he stated that the NEP represented a return to the original Bolshevik economic plans; he claimed that these had been derailed by the civil war, in which Sovnarkom had been forced to resort to the economic policies of war communism, which involved the nationalisation of industry, centralized distribution of output, coercive or forced requisition of agricultural production, and attempts to eliminate money circulation, private enterprises and free trade, leading to the severe economic collapse. The NEP allowed some private enterprise within Russia, permitting the reintroduction of the wage system and allowing peasants to sell produce on the open market while being taxed on their earnings. The policy also allowed for a return to privately owned small industry; basic industry, transport and foreign trade remained under state control. Lenin termed this "state capitalism", and many Bolsheviks thought it to be a betrayal of socialist principles. Lenin biographers have often characterised the introduction of the NEP as one of his most significant achievements, and some believe that had it not been implemented then Sovnarkom would have been quickly overthrown by popular uprisings.

In January 1920, the government brought in universal labour conscription, ensuring that all citizens aged between 16 and 50 had to work. Lenin also called for a mass electrification project of Russia, the GOELRO plan, which began in February 1920; Lenin's declaration that "communism is Soviet power plus the electrification of the whole country" was widely cited in later years. Seeking to advance the Russian economy through foreign trade, Sovnarkom sent delegates to the Genoa Conference; Lenin had hoped to attend but was prevented by ill health. The conference resulted in a Russian agreement with Germany, which followed on from an earlier trade agreement with the United Kingdom. Lenin hoped that by allowing foreign corporations to invest in Russia, Sovnarkom would exacerbate rivalries between the capitalist nations and hasten their downfall; he tried to rent the oil fields of Kamchatka to an American corporation to heighten tensions between the US and Japan, who desired Kamchatka for their empire.

== Later life ==
=== Declining health and conflict with Stalin: 1920–1923 ===
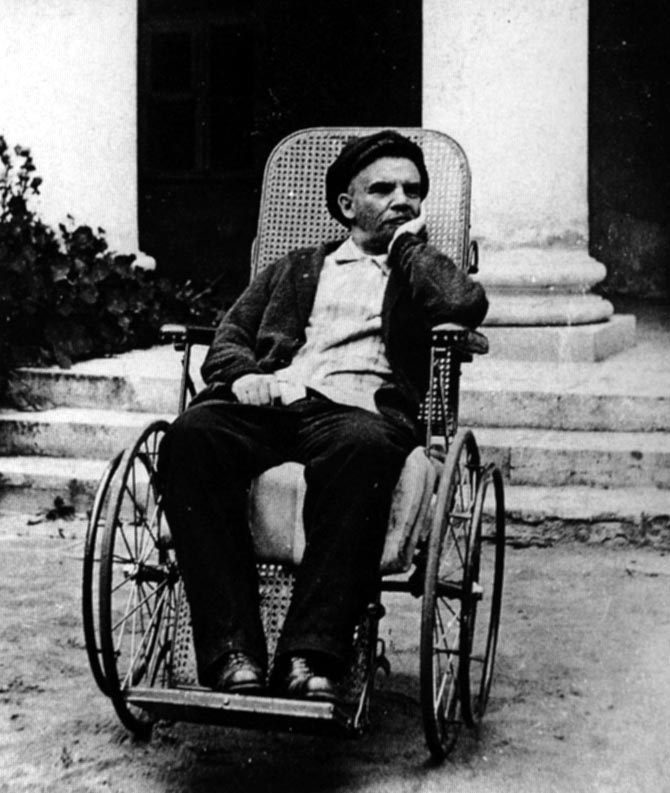
Lenin in a wheelchair shortly after his third stroke in March 1923

To Lenin's embarrassment and horror, in April 1920 the Bolsheviks held a large party to celebrate his 50th birthday, which was also marked by widespread celebrations across Russia and the publication of poems and biographies dedicated to him. Between 1920 and 1926, twenty volumes of Lenin's Collected Works were published; some material was omitted. During 1920, several prominent Western figures visited Lenin in Russia; these included the author H. G. Wells and the philosopher Bertrand Russell, as well as the anarchists Emma Goldman and Alexander Berkman. Lenin was also visited at the Kremlin by Inessa Armand, who was in increasingly poor health. He sent her to a sanatorium in Kislovodsk in the Northern Caucasus to recover, but she died there in September 1920 during a cholera epidemic. Her body was transported to Moscow, where a visibly grief-stricken Lenin oversaw her burial beneath the Kremlin Wall.

Lenin became seriously ill by the latter half of 1921, experiencing hyperacusis, insomnia, and regular headaches. At the Politburo's insistence, in July he left Moscow for a month's leave at his Gorki mansion, where he was cared for by his wife and sister. Lenin began to contemplate the possibility of suicide, asking both Krupskaya and Stalin to acquire potassium cyanide for him. Twenty-six physicians were hired to help Lenin during his final years; many of them were foreign and had been hired at great expense. Some suggested that his sickness could have been caused by metal oxidation from the bullets that were lodged in his body from the 1918 assassination attempt; in April 1922 he underwent a surgical operation to successfully remove them. The symptoms continued after this, with Lenin's doctors unsure of the cause; some suggested that he had neurasthenia or cerebral arteriosclerosis. In May 1922, he had his first stroke, temporarily losing his ability to speak and being paralysed on his right side. He convalesced at Gorki and had largely recovered by July. In October, he returned to Moscow; in December, he had a second stroke and returned to Gorki.

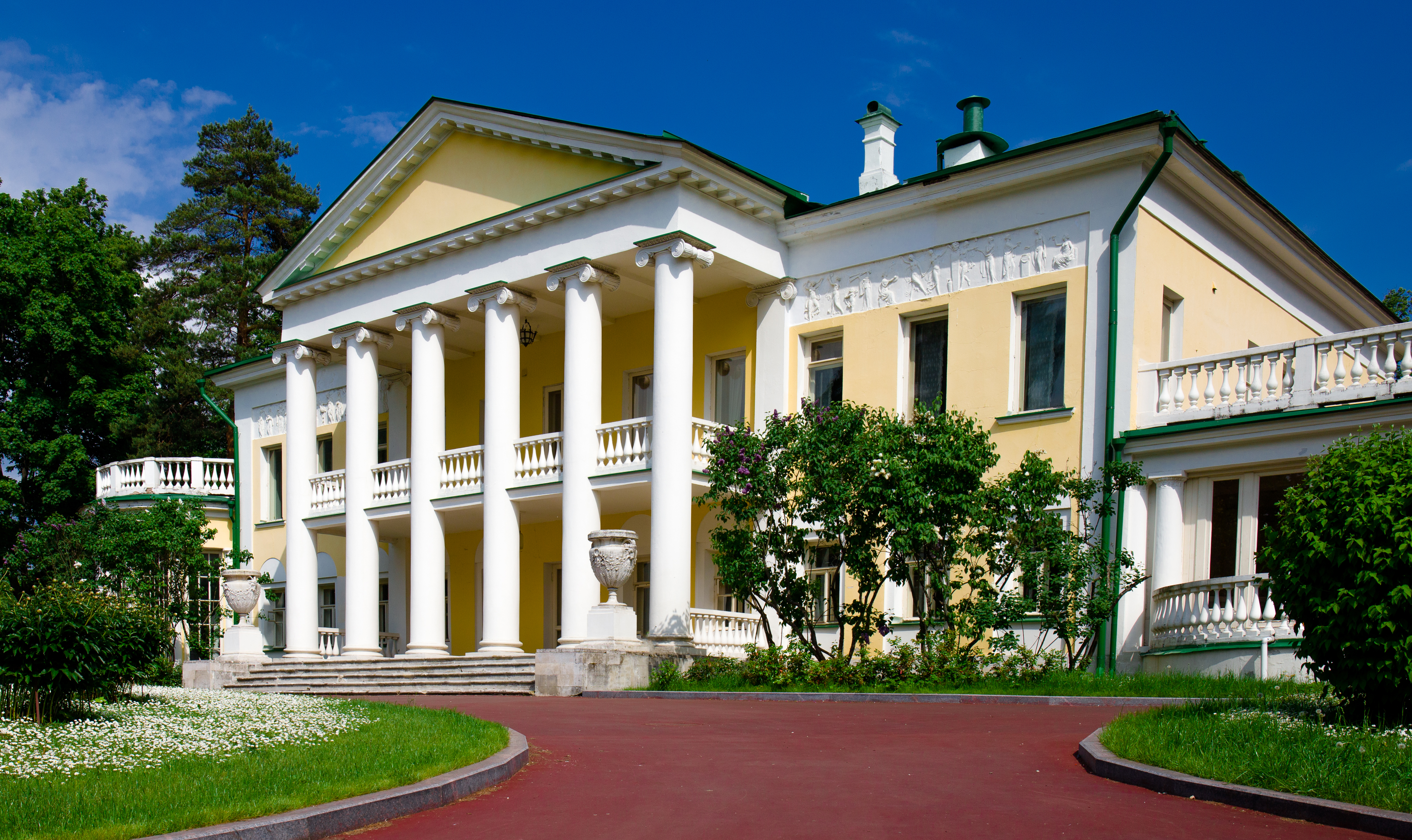
Lenin's Gorki mansion, where he spent much of his final years (pictured in 2022)

Despite his illness, Lenin remained keenly interested in political developments. When the Socialist Revolutionary Party's leadership was found guilty of conspiring against the government in a trial held between June and August 1922, Lenin called for their execution; they were instead imprisoned indefinitely, only being executed during the Great Purge of Stalin's leadership. With Lenin's support, the government also succeeded in virtually eradicating Menshevism in Russia by expelling all Mensheviks from state institutions and enterprises in March 1923 and then imprisoning the party's membership in concentration camps. Lenin was concerned by the survival of the Tsarist bureaucratic system in Soviet Russia, particularly during his final years. Condemning bureaucratic attitudes, he suggested a total overhaul to deal with such problems, in one letter complaining that "we are being sucked into a foul bureaucratic swamp".

During December 1922 and January 1923, Lenin dictated "Lenin's Testament", in which he discussed the personal qualities of his comrades, particularly Trotsky and Stalin. He recommended that Stalin be removed as General Secretary of the Communist Party, deeming him ill-suited for the position. He highlighted Trotsky's superior intellect but criticised his self-assurance and inclination toward excess administration. During this period he dictated a criticism of the bureaucratic nature of the Workers' and Peasants' Inspectorate, calling for the recruitment of new, working-class staff as an antidote to this problem, while in another article he called for the state to combat illiteracy, promote punctuality and conscientiousness within the populace, and encourage peasants to join co‑operatives.

Stalin is too crude, and this defect which is entirely acceptable in our milieu and in relationships among us as communists, becomes unacceptable in the position of General Secretary. I therefore propose to comrades that they should devise a means of removing him from this job and should appoint to this job someone else who is distinguished from comrade Stalin in all other respects only by the single superior aspect that he should be more tolerant, more polite and more attentive towards comrades, less capricious, etc.

— Lenin, 4 January 1923

In Lenin's absence, Stalin had begun consolidating his power both by appointing his supporters to prominent positions, and by cultivating an image of himself as Lenin's closest intimate and deserving successor. In December 1922, Stalin took responsibility for Lenin's regimen, being tasked by the Politburo with controlling who had access to him. Lenin was increasingly critical of Stalin; while Lenin was insisting that the state should retain its monopoly on international trade during mid-1922, Stalin was leading other Bolsheviks in unsuccessfully opposing this. There were personal arguments between the two as well; Stalin had upset Krupskaya by shouting at her during a phone conversation, which in turn greatly angered Lenin, who sent Stalin a letter expressing his annoyance.

The most significant political division between the two emerged during the Georgian affair. Stalin had suggested that both the forcibly Sovietized Georgia and neighbouring old Russian regions like Azerbaijan and Armenia, which were all part of the Russian empire for more than one hundred years, should be part of the Russian state, despite the protestations of their local Soviet-installed governments. Lenin saw this as an expression of Great Russian ethnic chauvinism by Stalin and his supporters, instead calling for these regions to become semi-independent parts of a greater union, which he suggested be called the Union of Soviet Republics of Europe and Asia. After some resistance to the proposal, Stalin eventually accepted it but, with Lenin's agreement, he changed the name of the newly proposed state to "Union of Soviet Socialist Republics (USSR)". Lenin sent Trotsky to speak on his behalf at a Central Committee plenum in December, where the plans for the Soviet Union were sanctioned; these plans were then ratified on 30 December by the Congress of Soviets, resulting in the formation of the Soviet Union. Despite his poor health, Lenin was elected chairman of the new government of the Soviet Union.

=== Death and funeral: 1923–1924 ===
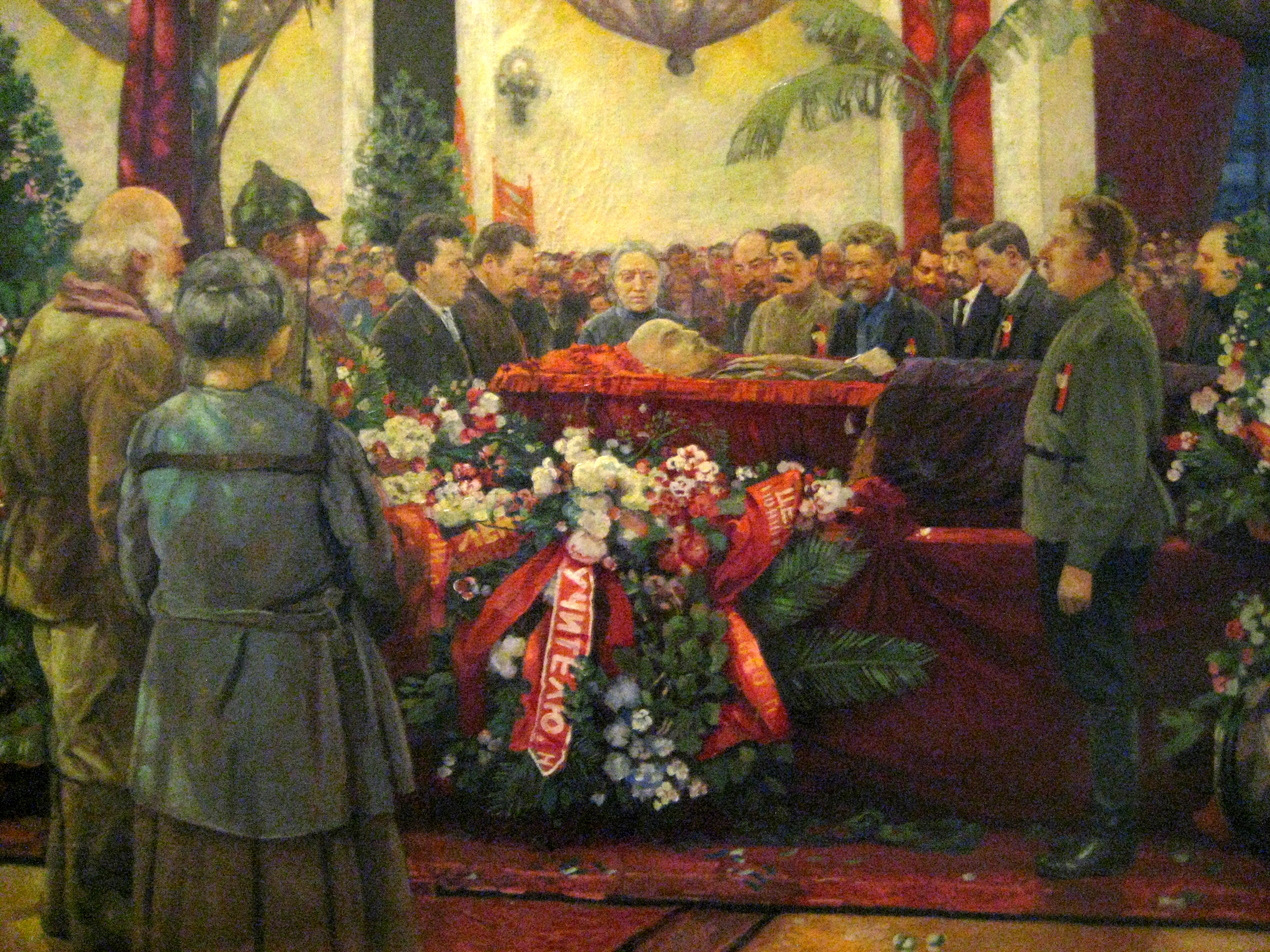
Lenin's funeral, as painted by Isaak Brodsky, 1925

In March 1923, Lenin had a third stroke and lost his ability to speak; that month, he experienced partial paralysis on his right side and began exhibiting sensory aphasia. By May, he appeared to be making a slow recovery, regaining some of his mobility, speech, and writing skills. In October, he made a final visit to the Kremlin. On 21 January 1924, Lenin fell into a coma and died at age 53. His official cause of death was recorded as an incurable disease of the blood vessels.

The Soviet government publicly announced Lenin's death the following day. On 23 January, mourners from the Communist Party, trade unions, and Soviets visited his Gorki home to inspect the body, which was carried in a red coffin by leading Bolsheviks. Transported by train to Moscow, the coffin was taken to the House of Trade Unions, where the body lay in state. Over the next three days, around a million mourners came to see the body, many queuing for hours in the freezing conditions. On 26 January, the eleventh All-Union Congress of Soviets met to pay respects, with speeches by Kalinin, Zinoviev, and Stalin. Notably, Trotsky was absent; he had been convalescing in the Caucasus, and he later claimed that Stalin sent him a telegram with the incorrect date of the planned funeral, making it impossible for him to arrive in time. Lenin's funeral took place the following day, when his body was carried to Red Square, accompanied by martial music, where assembled crowds listened to a series of speeches before the corpse was placed into the vault of a specially erected mausoleum. Despite the freezing temperatures, tens of thousands attended.

Against Krupskaya's protestations, Lenin's body was embalmed to preserve it for long-term public display in the Red Square mausoleum. During this process, Lenin's brain was removed; in 1925 an institute was established to dissect it, revealing that Lenin had had severe sclerosis. In July 1929, the Politburo agreed to replace the temporary mausoleum with a permanent one in granite, which was finished in 1933. His sarcophagus was replaced in 1940 and again in 1970. For safety amid the Second World War, from 1941 to 1945 the body was temporarily moved to Tyumen. As of 2026, his body remains on public display in Lenin's Mausoleum on Red Square.

== Political ideology ==
=== Marxism and Leninism ===
We do not pretend that Marx or Marxists know the road to socialism in all its concreteness. That is nonsense. We know the direction of the road, we know what class forces will lead it, but concretely, practically, this will be shown by the experience of the millions when they undertake the act.

— Lenin, 11 September 1917

Lenin was a devout Marxist, and believed that his interpretation of Marxism, first termed "Leninism" by Martov in 1904, was the sole authentic and orthodox one. According to his Marxist perspective, humanity would eventually reach pure communism, becoming a stateless, classless, egalitarian society of workers who were free from exploitation and alienation, controlled their own destiny, and abided by the rule "from each according to his ability, to each according to his needs". According to Volkogonov, Lenin "deeply and sincerely" believed that the path he was setting Russia on would ultimately lead to the establishment of this communist society.

Lenin's Marxist beliefs led him to the view that society could not transform directly from its present state to communism, but must first enter a period of socialism, and so his main concern was how to convert Russia into a socialist society. To do so, he believed that a dictatorship of the proletariat was necessary to suppress the bourgeoisie and develop a socialist economy. He defined socialism as "an order of civilized co-operators in which the means of production are socially owned", and believed that this economic system had to be expanded until it could create a society of abundance. To achieve this, he saw bringing the Russian economy under state control to be his central concern, with "all citizens" becoming "hired employees of the state" in his words. Lenin openly endorsed the unlimited issuance of fiat currency to fund the state, stating that "the best way to destroy the Capitalist System is to debauch the currency." He believed it was a necessary step during the revolutionary transition stating that eventually, "even the simplest peasant will realize that it is only a scrap of paper." Lenin's interpretation of socialism was centralised, planned, and statist, with both production and distribution strictly controlled. He believed that all workers throughout the country would voluntarily join to enable the state's economic and political centralisation. In this way, his calls for "workers' control" of the means of production referred not to the direct control of enterprises by their workers, but the operation of all enterprises under the control of a "workers' state". This resulted in what some perceive as two conflicting themes within Lenin's thought: popular workers' control, and a centralised, hierarchical, coercive state apparatus.

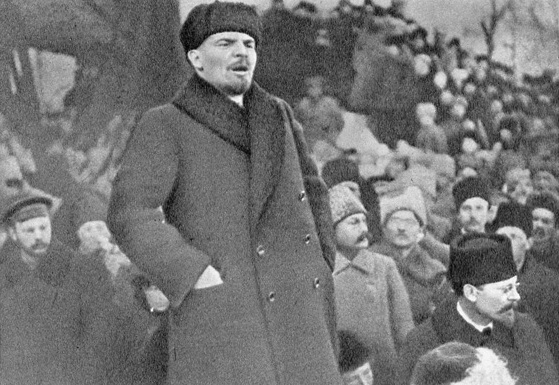
Lenin speaking in 1919

Before 1914, Lenin's views were largely in accordance with mainstream European Marxist orthodoxy. Although he derided Marxists who adopted ideas from contemporary non-Marxist philosophers and sociologists, his own ideas were influenced not only by Russian Marxist theory but also by wider ideas from the Russian revolutionary movement, including those of the Narodnik agrarian-socialists. He adapted his ideas according to changing circumstances, including the pragmatic realities of governing Russia amid war, famine, and economic collapse. As Leninism developed, Lenin revised the established Marxist orthodoxy and introduced innovations in Marxist thought.

In his theoretical writings, particularly Imperialism, the Highest Stage of Capitalism, Lenin discussed what he regarded as developments in capitalism since Marx's death; in his view, it had reached the new stage of state monopoly capitalism. He believed that although Russia's economy was dominated by the peasantry, the presence of monopoly capitalism in Russia meant that the country was sufficiently materially developed to move to socialism. Leninism adopted a more absolutist and doctrinaire perspective than other variants of Marxism, and distinguished itself by the emotional intensity of its liberationist vision. It also stood out by emphasising the role of a vanguard who could lead the proletariat to revolution, and elevated the role of violence as a revolutionary instrument.

=== Democracy and the national question ===
[Lenin] accepted truth as handed down by Marx and selected data and arguments to bolster that truth. He did not question old Marxist scripture, he merely commented, and the comments have become a new scripture.

— Louis Fischer, 1964

Lenin believed that the representative democracy of capitalist countries gave the illusion of democracy while maintaining the "dictatorship of the bourgeoisie"; describing the representative democratic system of the United States, he referred to the "spectacular and meaningless duels between two bourgeois parties", both of whom were led by "astute multimillionaires" who exploited the US proletariat. He opposed liberalism, which Dmitri Volkogonov considered "a mark" of his general antipathy toward liberty as a value, and believed that liberalism's freedoms were fraudulent because it did not free labourers from capitalist exploitation.

Lenin declared that "Soviet government is many millions of times more democratic than the most democratic-bourgeois republic", the latter of which was simply "a democracy for the rich". Lenin's belief as to what a proletarian state should look like nevertheless deviated from that adopted by the Marxist mainstream; European Marxists like Kautsky envisioned a democratically elected parliamentary government in which the proletariat had a majority, whereas Lenin called for a strong, centralised state apparatus headed by a supreme state organ of power that excluded any input from the bourgeois. He regarded his dictatorship of the proletariat as democratic because, he claimed, it involved the election of representatives to the soviets, workers electing their own officials, and the regular rotation and involvement of all workers in the administration of the state. However, as the Soviet state faced international isolation by the end of its victory in the Civil War and adopted NEP policies, which were also seen as a source of danger for the regime, Lenin stated that his government could "promise neither freedom nor democracy" until the threat of war or attack on the Soviet state was gone, just as any other government, he said, would act "in war", intending the denial of political freedoms to be provisional.

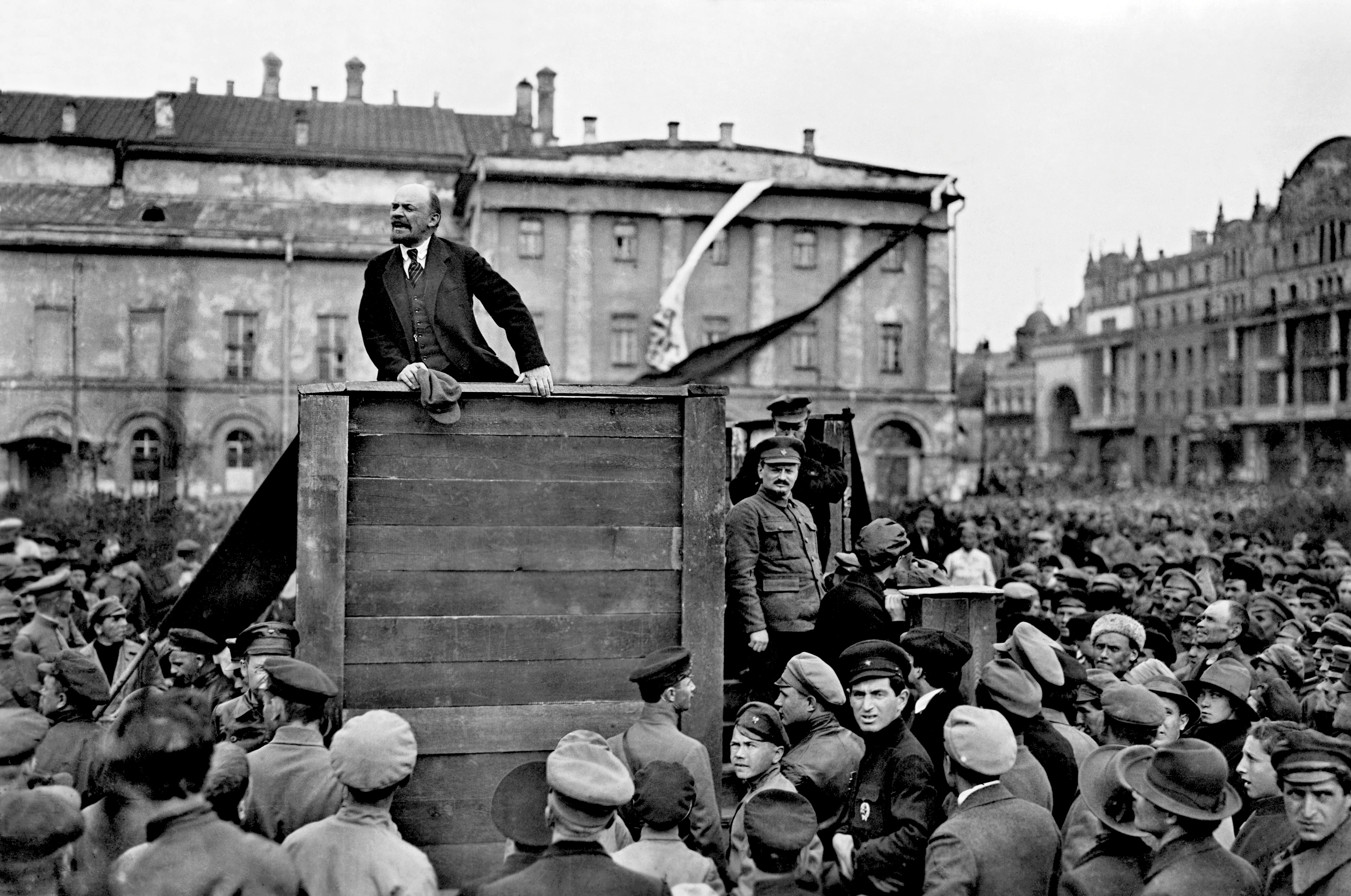
Lenin speaking to a crowd in Moscow's Sverdlov Square with Leon Trotsky and Lev Kamenev beside him, May 1920

Lenin was an internationalist and a keen supporter of world revolution, deeming national borders to be an outdated concept and nationalism a distraction from class struggle. He believed that in a socialist society, the world's nations would inevitably merge and result in a single world government. He believed that this state would need to be a centralised, unitary one, and regarded federalism as a bourgeois concept. In his writings, Lenin espoused anti-imperialist ideas and stated that all nations deserved "the right of self-determination". He supported wars of national liberation, accepting that such conflicts might be necessary for a minority group to break away from a communist state, because communist states are not "holy or insured against mistakes or weaknesses".

Prior to taking power in 1917, he was concerned that ethnic and national minorities would make the Soviet state ungovernable with their calls for independence; according to the historian Simon Sebag Montefiore, Lenin thus encouraged Stalin to develop "a theory that offered the ideal of autonomy and the right of secession without necessarily having to grant either". On taking power, Lenin called for the dismantling of the bonds that had forced minority ethnic groups to remain in the Russian Empire and espoused their right to secede but also expected them to reunite immediately in the spirit of proletariat internationalism. He was willing to use military force to ensure this unity, resulting in armed incursions into the independent states that formed in Ukraine, Georgia, Poland, Finland, and the Baltic states. Only when its conflicts with Finland, the Baltic states, and Poland proved unsuccessful did Lenin's government officially recognise their independence.

== Personal life and characteristics ==
Lenin saw himself as a man of destiny, and firmly believed in the righteousness of his cause and his own ability as a revolutionary leader. Biographer Louis Fischer described him as "a lover of radical change and maximum upheaval", a man for whom "there was never a middle-ground. He was an either-or, black-or-red exaggerator". Highlighting Lenin's "extraordinary capacity for disciplined work" and "devotion to the revolutionary cause", Pipes noted that he exhibited much charisma. Similarly, Volkogonov believed that "by the very force of his personality, [Lenin] had an influence over people". Conversely, Lenin's friend Maxim Gorky commented that in his physical appearance as a "baldheaded, stocky, sturdy person", the communist revolutionary was "too ordinary" and did not give "the impression of being a leader".

Historian and biographer Robert Service asserted that Lenin had been an intensely emotional young man, who exhibited strong hatred for the Tsarist authorities. According to Service, Lenin developed an "emotional attachment" to his ideological heroes, such as Marx, Engels, and Chernyshevsky; he owned portraits of them, and privately described himself as being "in love" with Marx and Engels. According to Lenin biographer James D. White, Lenin treated their writings as "holy writ", a "religious dogma", which should "not be questioned but believed in". In Volkogonov's view, Lenin accepted Marxism as "absolute truth", and accordingly acted like "a religious fanatic". Similarly, Bertrand Russell felt that Lenin exhibited "unwavering faith—religious faith in the Marxian gospel". Biographer Christopher Read suggested that Lenin was "a secular equivalent of theocratic leaders who derive their legitimacy from the [perceived] truth of their doctrines, not popular mandates". Lenin was nevertheless an atheist and a critic of religion, believing that socialism was inherently atheistic; he thus considered Christian socialism a contradiction in terms.

[Lenin's collected writings] reveal in detail a man with iron will, self-enslaving self-discipline, scorn for opponents and obstacles, the cold determination of a zealot, the drive of a fanatic, and the ability to convince or browbeat weaker persons by his singleness of purpose, imposing intensity, impersonal approach, personal sacrifice, political astuteness, and complete conviction of the possession of the absolute truth. His life became the history of the Bolshevik movement.

— Louis Fischer, 1964

Service stated that Lenin could be "moody and volatile", and Pipes deemed him to be "a thoroughgoing misanthrope", a view rejected by Read, who highlighted many instances in which Lenin displayed kindness, particularly toward children. According to several biographers, Lenin was intolerant of opposition, and often dismissed outright opinions that differed from his own. He could be "venomous in his critique of others", exhibiting a propensity for mockery, ridicule, and ad hominem attacks on those who disagreed with him. He ignored facts that did not suit his argument, abhorred compromise, and very rarely admitted his own errors. He refused to change his opinions, until he rejected them completely, after which he would treat the new view as if it was just as unchangeable. Lenin showed no signs of sadism or of personally desiring to commit violent acts, but he endorsed the violent actions of others, and exhibited no remorse for those killed for the revolutionary cause. Adopting a utilitarian stance, in Lenin's view the end always justified the means; according to Service, Lenin's "criterion of morality was simple: does a certain action advance or hinder the cause of the Revolution?"

Ethnically, Lenin identified as Russian. Service described Lenin as "a bit of a snob in national, social and cultural terms". The Bolshevik leader believed that other European countries, especially Germany, were culturally superior to Russia, describing the latter as "one of the most benighted, medieval and shamefully backward of Asian countries". He was annoyed at what he perceived as a lack of conscientiousness and discipline among the Russian people, and from his youth had wanted Russia to become more culturally European and Western.

The Lenin who seemed externally so gentle and good-natured, who enjoyed a laugh, who loved animals and was prone to sentimental reminiscences, was transformed when class or political questions arose. He at once became savagely sharp, uncompromising, remorseless and vengeful. Even in such a state he was capable of black humour.

— Dmitri Volkogonov, 1994

Despite his revolutionary politics, Lenin disliked revolutionary experimentation in literature and the arts, expressing his dislike of expressionism, futurism, and cubism, and conversely favouring realism and Russian classic literature. Lenin also had a conservative attitude towards sex and marriage. Throughout his adult life, he was in a relationship with Krupskaya, a fellow Marxist whom he married. Lenin and Krupskaya both regretted that they never had children, and they enjoyed entertaining their friends' offspring. Read noted that Lenin had "very close, warm, lifelong relationships" with his close family members; he had no lifelong friends, and Armand has been cited as being his only close confidante.

Aside from Russian, Lenin spoke and read French, German, and English. He was also fluent in Ancient Greek and Latin, having learned both during his youth. He remained very passionate about the Latin language throughout his life, and read Virgil, Ovid, Horace and Juvenal in the original, as well as Roman senatorial orations. Concerned with physical fitness, he exercised regularly, enjoyed cycling, swimming, and hunting, and also developed a passion for mountain walking in the Swiss peaks. He was also fond of pets, in particular cats. Tending to eschew luxury, he lived a spartan lifestyle, and Pipes noted that Lenin was "exceedingly modest in his personal wants", leading "an austere, almost ascetic, style of life". Lenin despised untidiness, always keeping his work desk tidy and his pencils sharpened, and insisted on total silence while he was working. According to Fischer, Lenin's "vanity was minimal", and for this reason he disliked the cult of personality that the Soviet administration began to build around him; he nevertheless accepted that it might have some benefits in unifying the communist movement.

== Legacy ==
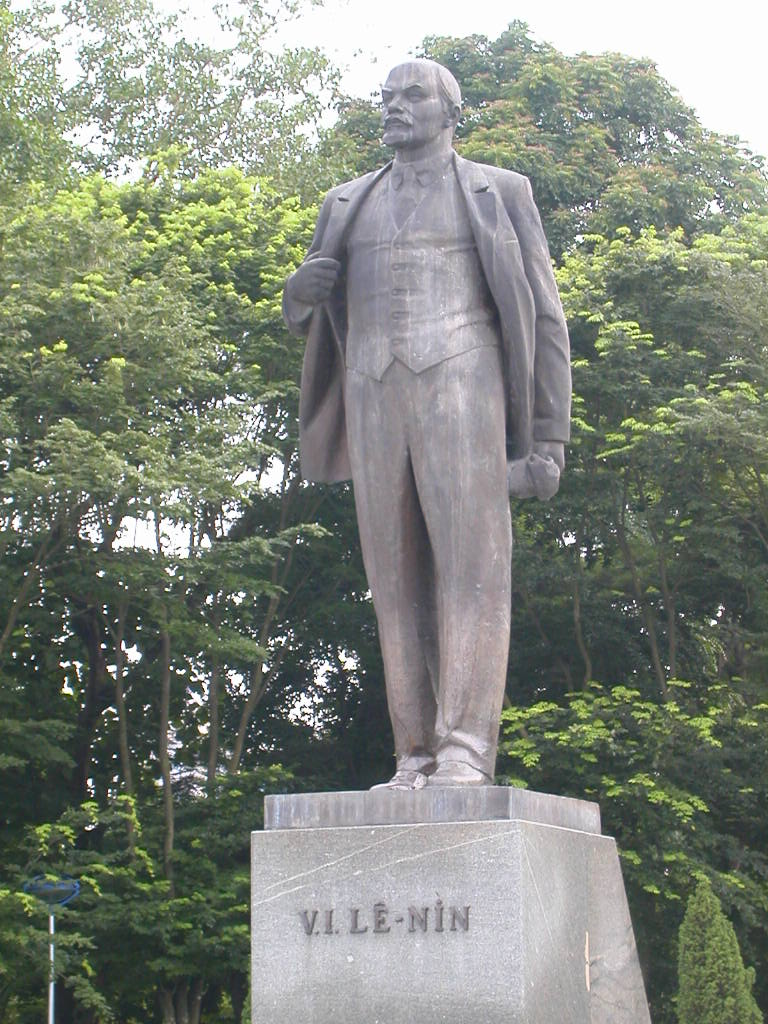
Lenin statue in Hanoi, Vietnam

Volkogonov said, while renouncing Leninist ideology, that "there can scarcely have been another man in history who managed so profoundly to change so large a society on such a scale." Lenin's administration laid the framework for the system of government that ruled Russia for seven decades and provided the model for later Communist-led states that came to cover a third of the inhabited world in the mid-20th century. As a result, Lenin's influence was global. A controversial figure, Lenin remains both reviled and revered, a figure who has been both idolised and demonised. Even during his lifetime, Lenin "was loved and hated, admired and scorned" by the Russian people. This has extended into academic studies of Lenin and Leninism, which have often been polarised along political lines.

The historian Albert Resis suggested that if the October Revolution is considered the most significant event of the 20th century, then Lenin "must for good or ill be considered the century's most significant political leader". White described Lenin as "one of the undeniably outstanding figures of modern history", while Service noted that the Russian leader was widely understood to be one of the 20th century's "principal actors". Read considered him "one of the most widespread, universally recognizable icons of the twentieth century", while Ryan called him "one of the most significant and influential figures of modern history". Time named Lenin one of the 100 most important people of the 20th century, and one of their top 25 political icons of all time.

In the Western world, biographers began writing about Lenin soon after his death; some such as Christopher Hill were sympathetic to him, and others such as Richard Pipes and Robert Gellately expressly hostile. Some later biographers such as Read and Lars Lih sought to avoid making either hostile or positive comments about him. Among sympathisers, he was portrayed as having made a genuine adjustment of Marxist theory that enabled it to suit Russia's particular socio-economic conditions. The Soviet view characterised him as a man who recognised the historically inevitable and accordingly helped to make the inevitable happen. Conversely, the majority of Western historians have perceived him as a person who manipulated events to attain and then retain political power, moreover, considering his ideas as attempts to ideologically justify his pragmatic policies. Later, revisionists in both Russia and the West highlighted the impact that pre-existing ideas and popular pressures exerted on Lenin and his policies.

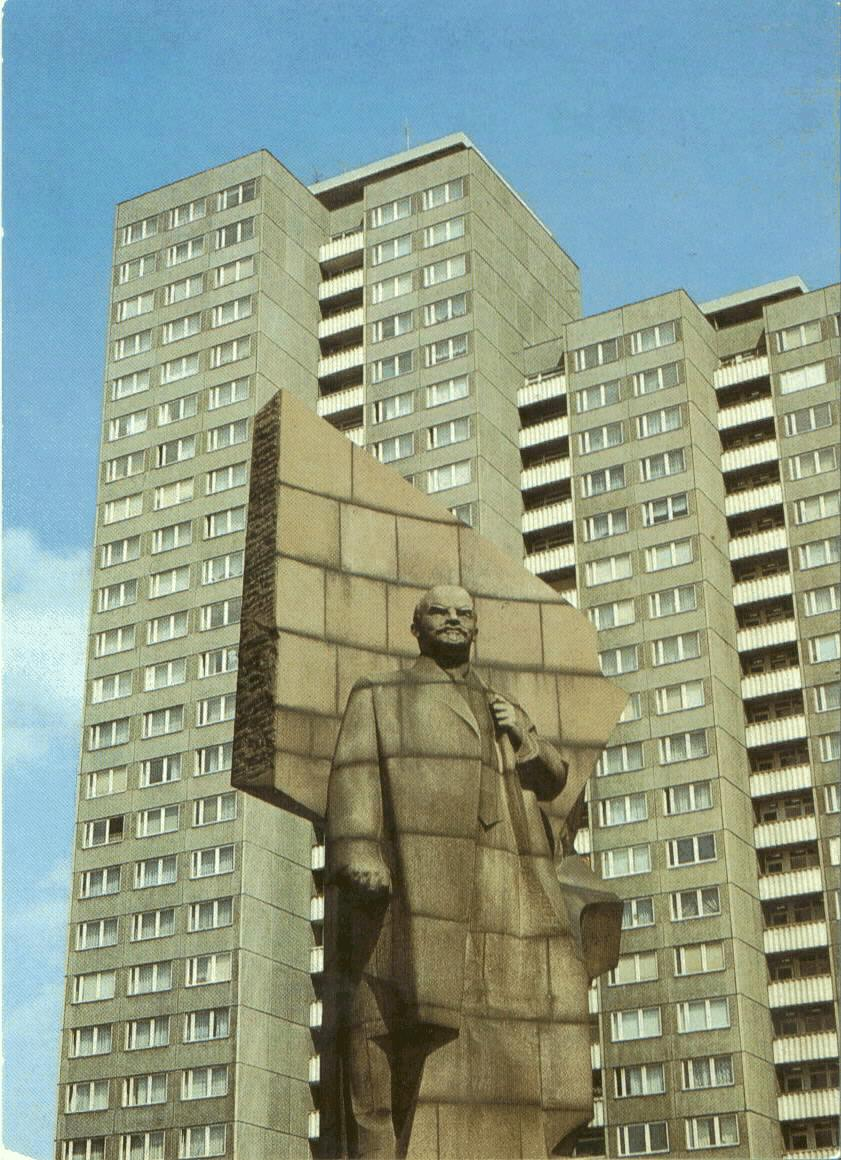
Statue of Lenin erected by the East German Marxist–Leninist government at Leninplatz in East Berlin (removed in 1992)

Various historians and biographers have characterised Lenin's administration as a police state, and many have described Lenin as a dictator. Fischer noted that while "Lenin was a dictator, [he was] not the kind of dictator Stalin later became." Volkogonov believed that whereas Lenin established a "dictatorship of the Party", it would only be under Stalin that the Soviet Union became the "dictatorship of one man". Ryan stated that he was "not a dictator in the sense that all his recommendations were accepted and implemented", for many of his colleagues disagreed with him on various issues. Moshe Lewin wrote that "he was not a dictator in his party, but its leader".

Some historians noted that his policies led to the establishment of a totalitarian system in the USSR, while others (including Volkogonov) directly characterized his government as a totalitarian regime. Moshe Lewin argued that "The Soviet regime underwent a long period of 'Stalinism', which in its basic features was diametrically opposed to the recommendations of [Lenin's] testament". The description of Stalinism as a continuation of Leninism, and thus of Leninism as a totalitarian system, was consenus in Western historiography until such revisionist historians as Lewin broke the consensus in the late 1960s. According to Evan Mawdsley, the revisionist position on this issue "had been dominant from the 1970s".

Marxist observers, including Western historians Hill and John Rees, argued against the view that Lenin's government was a dictatorship, viewing it instead as an imperfect way of preserving elements of democracy without some of the processes found in liberal democratic states. Ryan contends that the leftist historian Paul Le Blanc "makes a quite valid point that the personal qualities that led Lenin to brutal policies were not necessarily any stronger than in some of the major Western leaders of the twentieth century". Ryan also posits that for Lenin revolutionary violence was merely a means to an end, namely the establishment of a socialist, ultimately communist world—a world without violence. Historian J. Arch Getty stated, "Lenin deserves a lot of credit for the notion that the meek can inherit the earth, that there can be a political movement based on social justice and equality." Some left-wing intellectuals, among them Slavoj Žižek, Alain Badiou, Lars T. Lih, and Fredric Jameson, advocate reviving Lenin's uncompromising revolutionary spirit to address contemporary global problems.

=== Within the Soviet Union ===
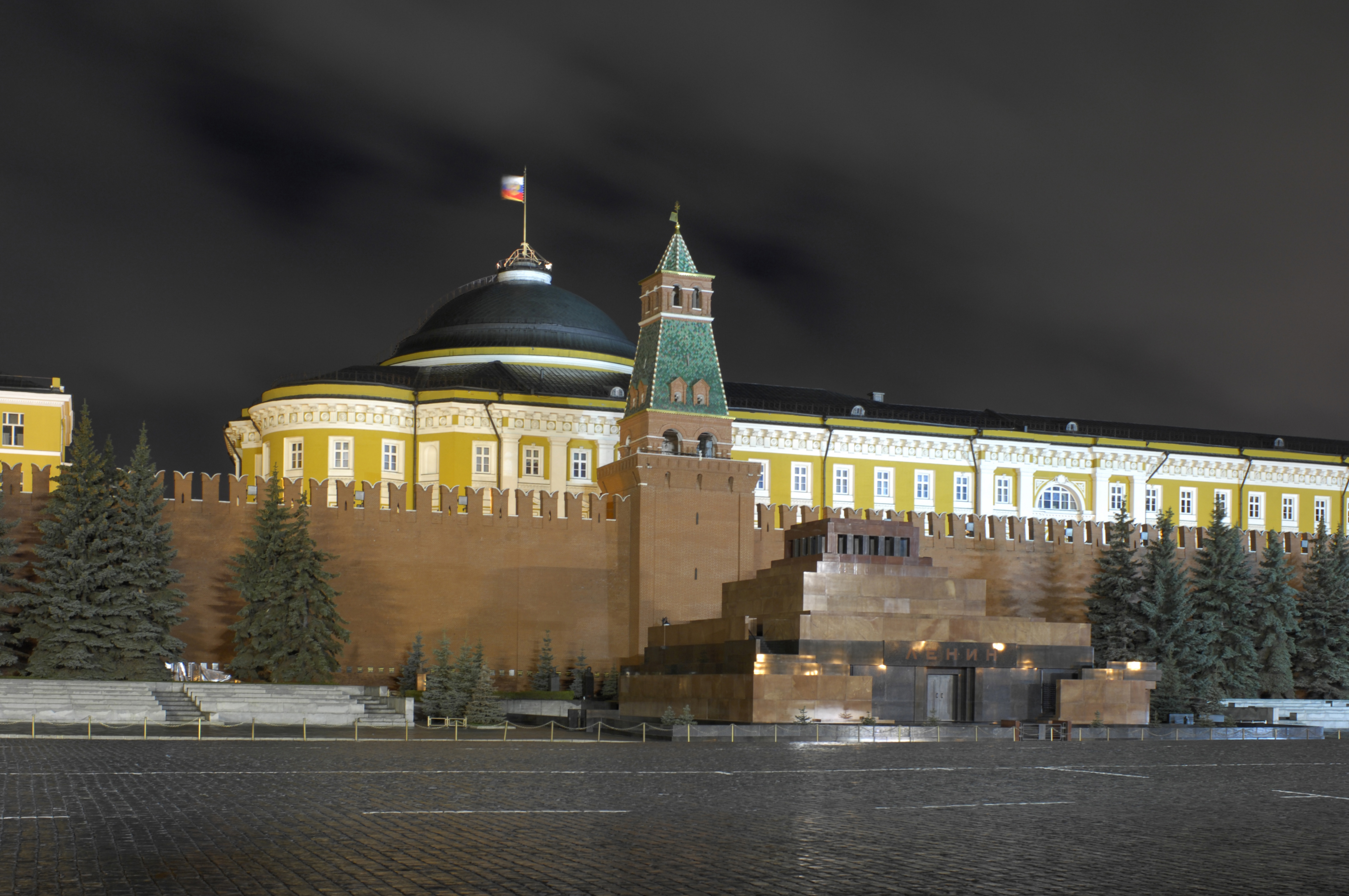
Lenin's Mausoleum in front of the Kremlin, 2007

In the Soviet Union, a cult of personality devoted to Lenin began to develop during his lifetime, but was only fully established after his death. According to historian Nina Tumarkin, it represented the world's "most elaborate cult of a revolutionary leader" since that of George Washington in the United States, and has been repeatedly described as "quasi-religious" in nature. Busts or statues of Lenin were erected in almost every village, and his face adorned postage stamps, crockery, posters, and the front pages of Soviet newspapers Pravda and Izvestia. The places where he had lived or stayed were converted into museums devoted to him. Libraries, streets, farms, museums, towns, and regions were named after him, with the city of Petrograd being renamed "Leningrad" in 1924, and his birthplace of Simbirsk becoming Ulyanovsk. The Order of Lenin was established as one of the country's highest decorations. All of this was contrary to Lenin's own desires and was publicly criticised by his widow.

Biographers have stated that Lenin's writings were treated in a manner akin to religious scripture within the Soviet Union, while Pipes added that "his every opinion was cited to justify one policy or another and treated as gospel". Stalin systematised Leninism through lectures at the Sverdlov University, which were published as Questions of Leninism. Stalin also had much of Lenin's writings stored in a secret archive in the Marx–Engels–Lenin Institute. Material such as Lenin's collection of books in Kraków was also collected from abroad for storage in the institute, often at great expense. During the Soviet era, these writings were strictly controlled and very few had access. All of Lenin's writings that proved useful to Stalin were published, but the others remained hidden, and knowledge of both Lenin's non-Russian ancestry and his noble status was suppressed. In particular, knowledge of his Jewish ancestry was suppressed until the late 1980s, perhaps out of Soviet antisemitism, and so as not to undermine Russification efforts, and perhaps so as not to provide fuel for anti-Soviet sentiment among international antisemites. After the discovery of Lenin's Jewish ancestry, this aspect was repeatedly emphasised by the Russian far-right, who claimed that his inherited Jewish genetics explained his desire to uproot traditional Russian society. Under Stalin's regime, Lenin was portrayed as a close friend of Stalin's. During the Soviet era, five separate editions of Lenin's published works were published in Russian, the first beginning in 1920 and the last from 1958 to 1965; the fifth edition was described as "complete", but had much omitted for political expediency.

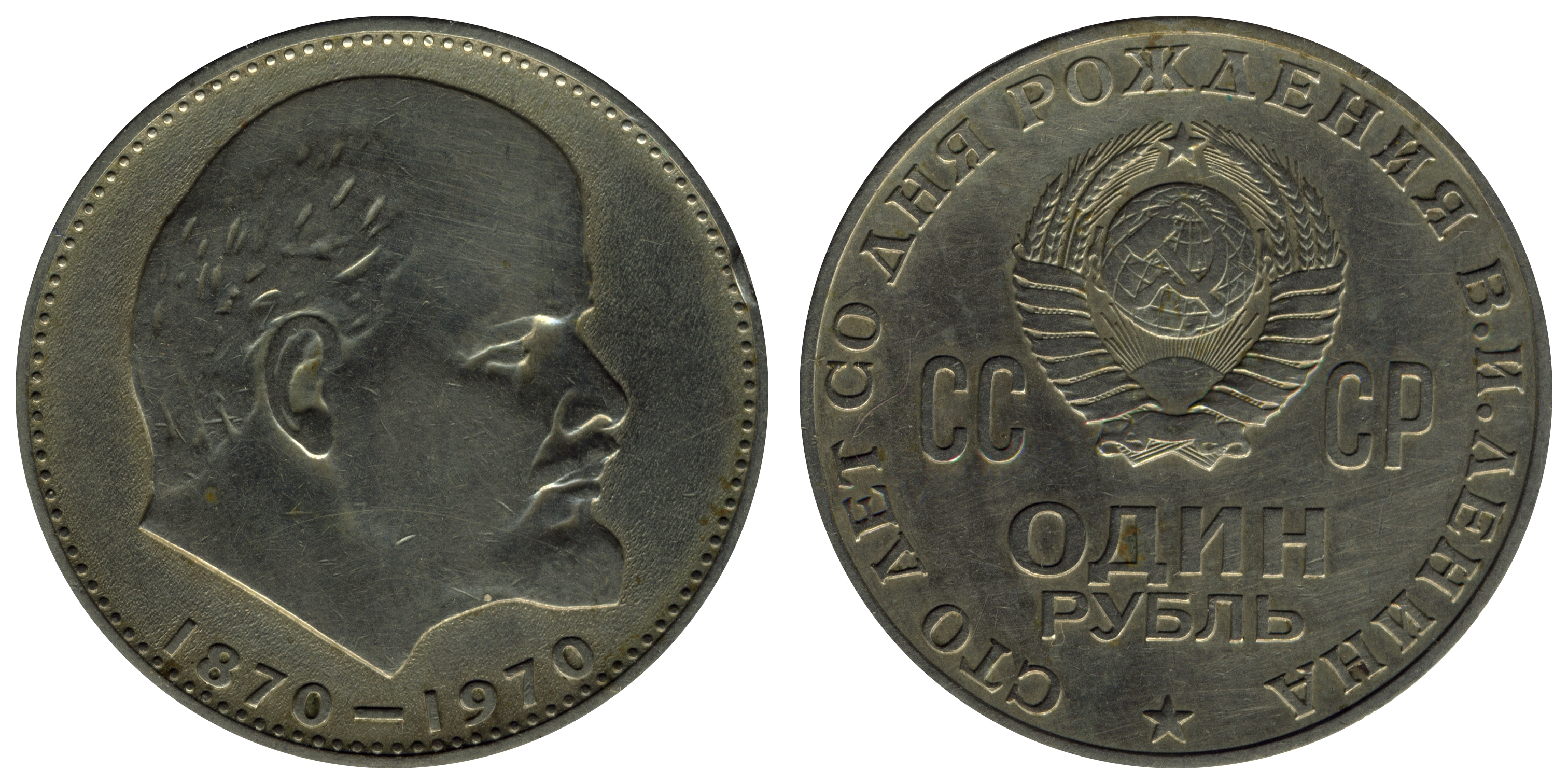
Commemorative one ruble coin minted in 1970 in honour of the centenary of Lenin's birth

After Stalin's death, Nikita Khrushchev became leader of the Soviet Union and began a process of de-Stalinisation, citing Lenin's writings, including those on Stalin, to legitimise this process. When Mikhail Gorbachev took power in 1985 and introduced the policies of glasnost and perestroika, he too cited these actions as a return to Lenin's principles. In late 1991, amid the dissolution of the Soviet Union, Russian president Boris Yeltsin ordered the Lenin archive be placed under the control of a state organ, the Russian Centre for the Preservation and Study of Documents of Recent History, at which it was revealed that over 6,000 of Lenin's writings had gone unpublished. These were made available for scholarly study. Since 1991, there has been some discussion about moving Lenin's body from the mausoleum to the Kremlin Wall Necropolis. President Boris Yeltsin intended to close the mausoleum and bury Lenin next to his mother at the Volkov Cemetery in Saint Petersburg. His successor, Vladimir Putin, opposed this.

Russia retained the vast majority of the 7,000 Lenin statues extant in 1991; as of 2022, there were approximately 6,000 monuments to Lenin in Russia. In Ukraine, during the 2013–2014 Euromaidan protests, Lenin statues were damaged or destroyed by protesters, and in 2015 the Ukrainian government ordered that all others be dismantled to comply with decommunisation laws. During the Russia's full-scale invasion of Ukraine in 2022, many were re-erected by Russian occupiers in Russian-occupied areas. Beginning in 1998, the independent agency Levada has perennially conducted polls measuring the perception of Lenin's legacy among Russians: in 2024, 67% of respondents believed Lenin played a positive role in the country's history.

=== In the international communist movement ===
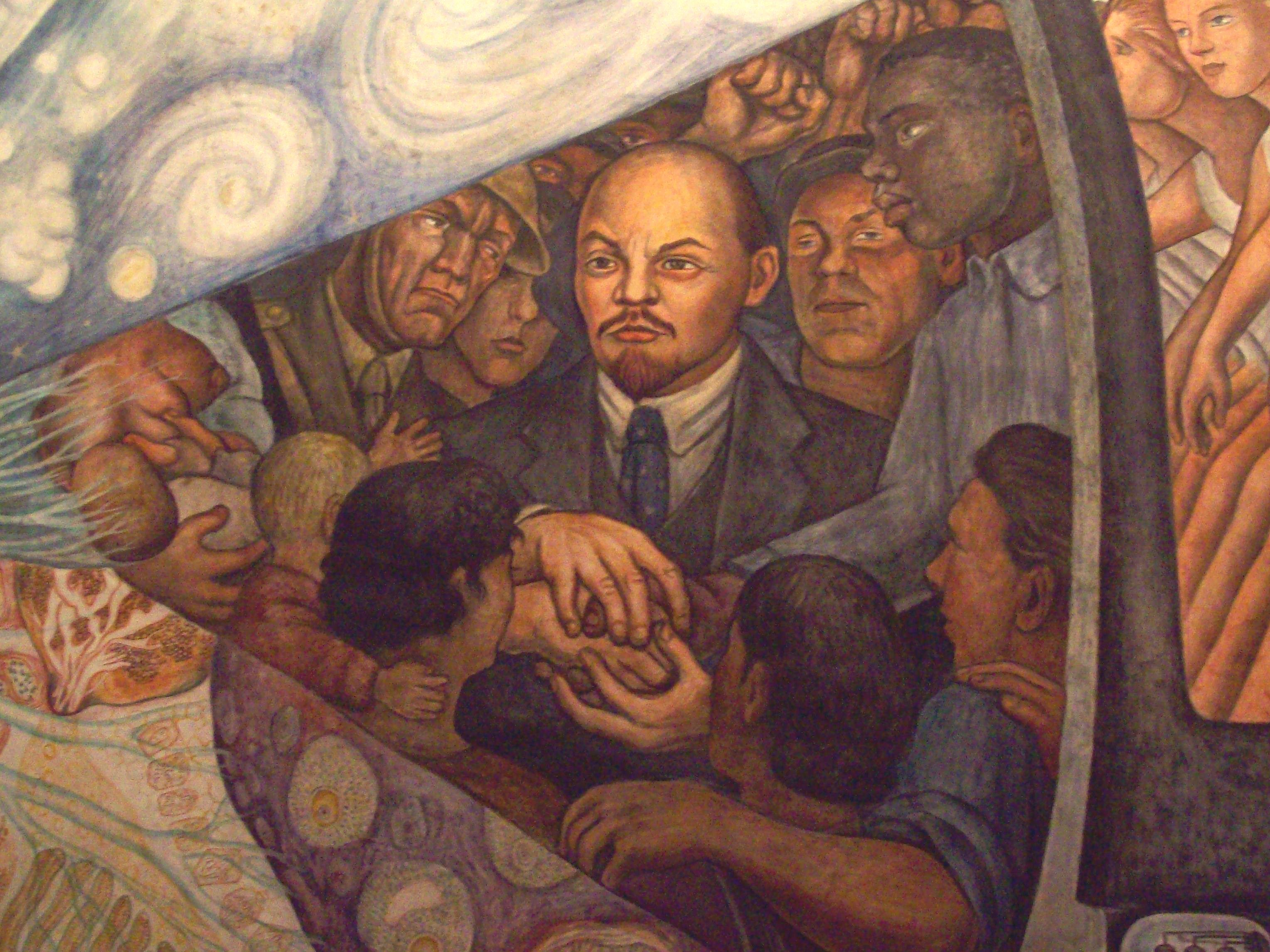
Detail of Man, Controller of the Universe, a fresco by Diego Rivera in the Palacio de Bellas Artes in Mexico City, depicting Lenin

After Lenin's death, Stalin's administration established Marxism–Leninism, an ideology that came to be interpreted differently within the communist movement. According to Lenin biographer David Shub, writing in 1965, it was Lenin's ideas and example that "constitutes the basis of the Communist movement today". Communist states claiming they followed Lenin's ideas appeared internationally during the 20th century, forming variants such as Stalinism, Maoism, Juche, Ho Chi Minh Thought, and Castroism. Writing in 1972, the historian Marcel Liebman stated that "there is hardly any insurrectionary movement today, from Latin America to Angola, that does not lay claim to the heritage of Leninism." Conversely, many later Western communists expressed the view that Lenin and his ideas were irrelevant to their own objectives.

== See also ==
- Outline of the Russian Revolution and Civil War
- Bibliography of the Russian Revolution and Civil War
- Bibliography of Stalinism and the Soviet Union
- Vladimir Lenin bibliography
- Index of Old Bolsheviks
- Index of articles related to the Russian Revolution and Civil War
- Foreign relations of the Soviet Union
- Lenin Peace Prize
- Lenin Prize
- Lenin Award (Sweden)
- Assassination attempts on Vladimir Lenin
- Lenin's Testament
- Old Bolsheviks
- Brain of Vladimir Lenin
- Tampere Lenin Museum
- Lenin's Mausoleum

== Notes ==
Political offices
Position established	Chairman of the Council of People's Commissars of the Russian Socialist Federative Soviet Republic; 1917–1924	Succeeded by Alexei Rykov
Position established	Chairman of the Council of People's Commissars of the Union of Soviet Socialist Republics; 1922–1924	Succeeded by Alexei Rykov
Military offices
Position established	Chairman of the Council of Labour and Defence; 1918–1920	Succeeded by Himself as Chair of the Sovnarkom
