= Ulyanov =

Ulyanov (Russian: Улья́нов), or Ulyanova (feminine; Улья́нова) is a common Russian last name and may refer to several people:

- Alexander Ulyanov (1866–1887), Russian revolutionary, Vladimir Lenin's brother
- Anatoliy Ulyanov (b. 1998), Ukrainian footballer
- Anna Ulyanova (1864–1935), Russian revolutionary, Vladimir Lenin's sister
- Boris Ulyanov (1891–1951), Russian tennis player
- Dina Ulyanova (born 1989), Azerbaijani basketball player
- Dmitri Ulyanov (footballer) (b. 1970), Soviet and Russian footballer
- Dmitry Ilyich Ulyanov (1874–1943), Russian revolutionary, Vladimir Lenin's brother
- Dmytro Ulyanov (b. 1993), Ukrainian footballer
- Grigory Ulyanov (1859–1912), Russian linguist
- Ilya Ulyanov (1831–1886), Russian public figure in the field of public education and a teacher, Vladimir Lenin's father
- Inna Ulyanova (1934–2005), Soviet and Russian actress and singer
- Ivan Ulyanov (1884–1946), Russian revolutionary
- Maria Alexandrovna Ulyanova (1835–1916), Vladimir Lenin's mother
- Maria Ilyinichna Ulyanova (1878–1937), Vladimir Lenin's sister
- Mikhail Ulyanov (1927–2007), Soviet actor
- Mikhail Ivanovich Ulyanov (b. 1953), Russian diplomat
- Nikolai Ulyanov (1875–1949), Russian painter and graphic artist
- Olga Ilyinichna Ulyanova (1871–1891), Vladimir Lenin's sister
- Olga Ulyanova (1922–2011), Vladimir Lenin's niece
- Petr Lavrentyevich Ulyanov (1928–2006), Soviet and Russian mathematician
- Svetlana Ulyanova (born 1979), Russian weightlifter
- Vitaly Ulyanov (1925–?), Soviet soldier and Hero of the Soviet Union
- Vladimir Ulyanov (1870–1924), the birth name of Vladimir Lenin
- Vladimir Ulyanov (officer) (1965–2003), Russian army officer and Hero of Russia

== See also ==
- Ulyanovsky (disambiguation)
- Ulyanovsk
