= Olga Ulyanova =

Russian scientist and writer (1922–2011)

- Born: Olga Dmitrievna Ulyanova; 4 March 1922; Moscow, Soviet Union
- Died: 25 March 2011 (aged 89); Moscow, Russia
- Occupations: chemist, physicist, writer
- Parent(s): Dmitry Ilyich Ulyanov; Antonia Ivanovna Neshcheretova
- Relatives: Vladimir Lenin (uncle); Aleksandr Ulyanov (uncle); Anna Ulyanova (aunt); Olga Ilyinichna Ulyanova (aunt); Maria Ilyinichna Ulyanova (aunt); Ilya Ulyanov (grandfather); Maria Alexandrovna Ulyanova (grandmother); Alexandr Dmitrievich Blank (great-grandfather)
- Awards: Order of the Red Banner of Labour

Olga Dmitrievna Ulyanova (Russian: Ольга Дмитриевна Ульянова; 4 March 1922 – 25 March 2011) was a Russian chemist, physicist, and writer. The niece of Vladimir Lenin, she was one of his last-known living relatives before her death. Ulyanova was a supporter of Lenin's legacy, writing extensively about her uncle and family. She was awarded the Order of the Red Banner of Labour by the Soviet Union for her writing. Ulyanova actively campaigned for Lenin's body to stay in Lenin's Mausoleum during discussions of reburying it outside of the Red Square. While supportive of maintaining Lenin's legacy, she told European press that it was a mistake to make him into an icon.

== Biography ==
Olga Ulyanova was born in Moscow on 4 March 1922, the daughter of the Russian physician and revolutionary Dmitry Ilyich Ulyanov and Antonia Ivanovna Neshcheretova. She had a brother, Viktor. Ulyanova's father was the brother of Vladimir Lenin, Aleksandr Ulyanov, Anna Ulyanova, Olga Ilyinichna Ulyanova, and Maria Ilyinichna Ulyanova. Her grandfather, Ilya Nikolayevich Ulyanov, was an educator who was promoted to the rank of Active State Councillor, thus granting the family the privilege of hereditary nobility. Her grandmother, Maria Alexandrovna Ulyanova, was a member of the Blank family.

Ulyanova grew up in the Kremlin, surrounded by children of other Bolshevik leaders.

In 1991, following the collapse of the Soviet Union, there was discussion of moving Lenin's preserved body from his tomb on Red Square to Kremlin Wall Necropolis or Volkovo Cemetery. Ulyanova fiercely objected to the discussion, believing that Lenin's body belonged at Red Square, and campaigned for the body to stay there. In 2007, she told Interfax News Agency that "those who want his reburial are just malefactors."

In 2008, Ulyanova told Panorama that "it was a mistake to turn [Lenin] into an icon", saying that "ideological distortions, falsification of his theories were even a bigger mistake." She maintained the position that her uncle disapproved of the execution of the Romanov family.

Ulyanova, a chemist and physicist, worked as professor of chemistry and physics at various Russian universities. She also wrote multiple books about Lenin. She was awarded the Order of the Red Banner of Labour for her writing.

She died in Moscow on 25 March 2011. According to the government in Ulyanovsk Oblast, Ulyanova was one of the last known living relatives of Lenin.
