= Isaak Lalayants =

Russian revolutionary, Bolshevik and comrade-in-arms of Vladimir Lenin

- Исаак Христофорович Лалаянц
- Born: 5 August 1870; Kizlyar, Terek Oblast, Russian Empire
- Died: 14 July 1933 (aged 62); Moscow, Soviet Union
- Other names: Columbus, Izarov, Insarov, Nikolay Nikolayevich
- Occupation: Politician
- Spouses: Praskovia Ivanovna Kulyabko; Anna Safonovna Lalayants
- Children: Vladimir; Leonid

Isaak Khristoforovich Lalayants (pseudonyms: Columbus, Izarov, Insarov et al.; 5 August [O.S. 24 July] 1870 – 14 July 1933) was a Russian revolutionary, Bolshevik and comrade-in-arms of Vladimir Lenin.

He was a member of the Russian Social Democratic Labour Party (RSDLP) since 1898 and member of its Central Committee from 1905 to 1906.

== Early youth ==
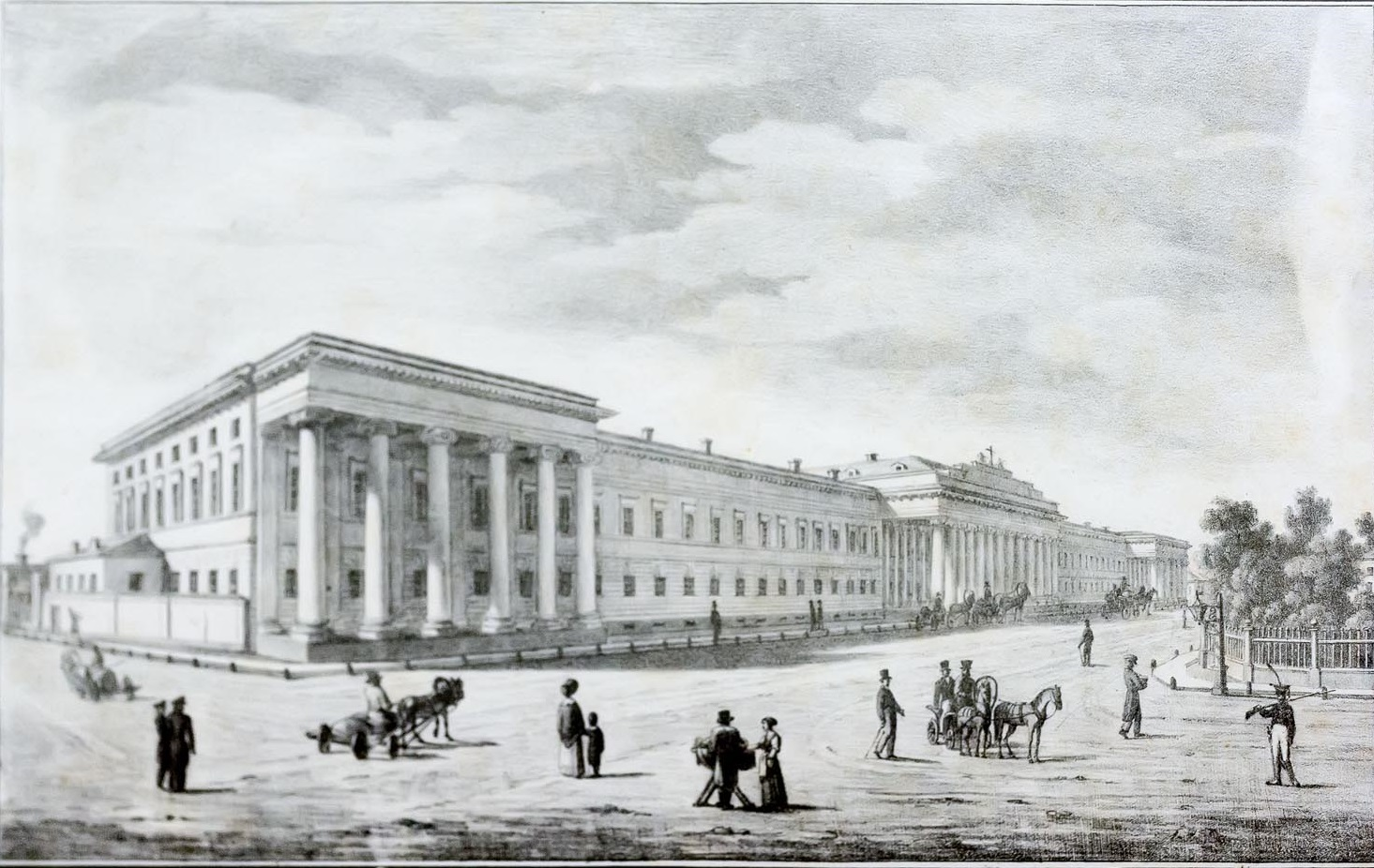
Kazan Imperial University in 1832.

Isaak Lalayants was born in to an Armenian family in the town of Kizlyar, in Terek Oblast. After learning initial Armenian literacy, he is sent to Tbilisi, where he enters the first class of the Realschule. During the transition to second grade, he was transferred to the Kazan real school, where he graduated in 1889.

In Kazan, Lalayants got acquainted with the circle of the prominent Russian Marxist Nikolai Fedoseev, who made a very strong impression on him. Lalayants subsequently writes that Fedoseev possessed a strong and deep mind, that he was "a man with brilliant talents both in the field of theory and practice". In the years 1888–1889, Lalayants joined the Marxist circle of Fedoseev, under whose leadership he began to study Marxist literature.

He studied at the Kazan Imperial University, but was expelled in 1889 after being arrested for participating in the revolutionary movement. He was deported from Kazan with an interdiction for an indefinite period to return there.

For around two years, he stayed in different cities of Russia, serving military service in the Caucasus. In Nizhny Novgorod he conducted social democratic propaganda in the workers' circles of Sormovo, the workshops of the Kurbatov shipping company and others.

In the autumn of 1892, Lalayants returned to Kazan, continuing revolutionary propaganda in social democratic circles among students and young workers. Together with local Marxists, he studied the works of Marx, Engels, Plekhanov and Kautsky. He also led heated discussions with the Narodniks.

Lalayants translated Engels's The Origin of the Family, Private Property and the State (1884) and Kautsky's The Economic Doctrines of Karl Marx (1887). He managed to establish contact with the publishing house J. W. H. Dietz (owned by SPD politician Johann Heinrich Wilhelm Dietz) in Stuttgart and to receive Marxist literature from there. "I personally" writes Lalayants, "was able to receive by mail directly from Dietz from Stuttgart, also in German, The Origin of the Family, Private Property and the State by Fr. Engels. Thanks to some cunning Dietz (according to my warning about our customs censorship) Engels's book was skillfully woven into some 'double-entry bookkeeping' of some Schmidt, as a result of which it slipped across our border as a completely innocent thing. The gendarmerie seized it from me at the time of my arrest, half translated by me".

== Work with young Lenin ==
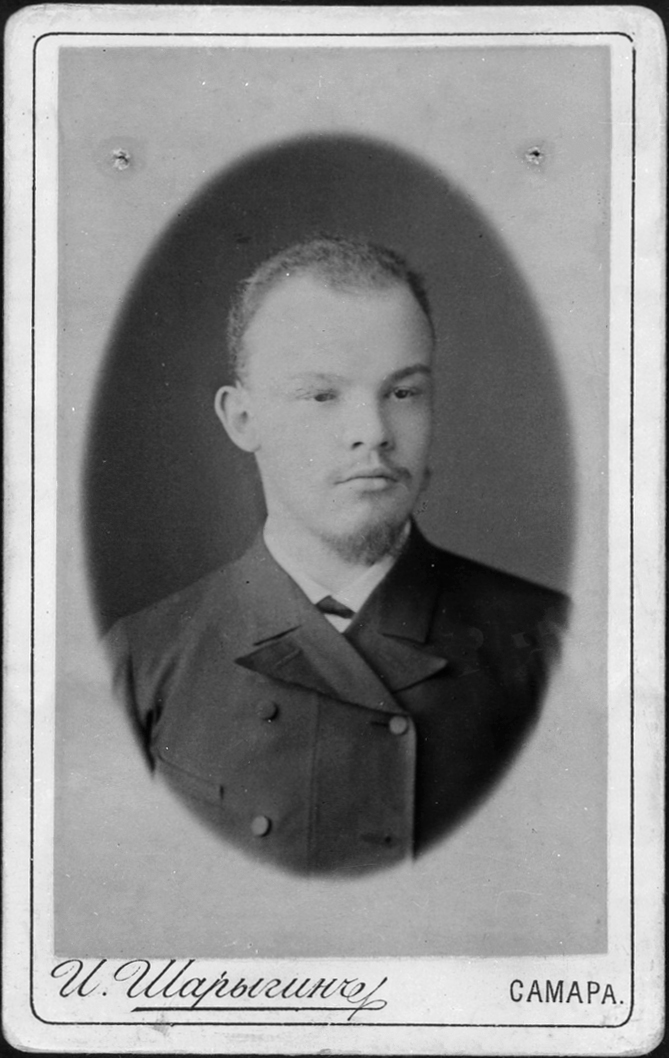
V. I. Lenin in 1891.

In January 1893, Lalayants was arrested again and deported to Samara, where he spends the first days at the apartment of former Narodnaya Volya member Nikolay Dolgov, getting acquainted with Lenin and, through him, with Alexei Sklyarenko and other local Marxists. Lalayants recalls his first meeting with Lenin as follows: "The next day (after coming to Samara) I went to Dolgov's. [...] Then someone knocked on the door – a young man around 22–23 years old entered. In front of me stood a man with unusual appearance, somehow immediately disposing himself. It was V. I. Ulyanov. He really impressed me then. In this twenty-three-year-old man, simplicity, sensitivity, cheerfulness and shyness, on the one hand, and solidity and depth of knowledge, ruthless logical sequence, lucidity and clarity of judgments and definitions, on the other, were combined in an amazing way. Samara immediately ceased to seem to me such a wilderness, and after that first meeting I was glad that I chose it myself".

In Samara, Lalayants entered the illegal social democratic circle led by Lenin. Together with Lenin and Sklyarenko, he conducts extensive propaganda work (mainly among students and workers in railway workshops), also against the representatives of Narodism.

In June 1894, Lalayants receives a sentence in the Kazan case: 10 months of solitary confinement and 3 years of public surveillance. He was arrested and sent to Kresty Prison in Saint Petersburg. Learning about the fact that Lalayants is in the "Saint Petersburg Prison for Solitary Confinement" (official name under Imperial Russia), Lenin, through the student Olga Ivanovna Chachina, establishes contact with him, sending him literature (The Development of the Monist View of History (1895) by Georgi Plekhanov, among others). "Thanks to the care of Vladimir Ilyich, I was a bit aware of at least the newly published legal literature" recalls Lalayants.

Upon liberation on 24 April 1895, Lalayants meets with Lenin and goes to Moscow, where he visits Lenin's relatives. "All... evening and part of the next day," writes Lalayants, "we were always together. From the stories of V. I., I learned a lot of interesting things about the life and work of the Petersburg circles; in particular, about the clandestine literary work of Vladimir Ilyich. From his words, I could conclude that in St. Petersburg, at that time, propaganda and even agitation work was quite firmly and widely established, especially among the workers of large factories; he also talked a lot about Materials for the Characterization of Our Economic Development (collection of articles), prepared for release, and about the disputes with Struve, about his relations with him. For me, the active and leading role of Vladimir Ilyich in all these works began to appear with sufficient clarity, although he himself did not stress it at all". Lalayants leaves for Penza.

In September 1895, Lenin wrote a letter to Lalayants about his return from abroad. Lalayants hastens to Moscow to meet with Lenin. Returning to Penza after his meeting, he brings with him Lenin's illegal Marxist literature of foreign publication and a copy of Materials for the Characterization of Our Economic Development, which includes Lenin's work The Economic Content of Narodism and the Criticism of it in Mr. Struve's Book, published under the pseudonym K. Tulin. Lenin commissions Lalayants to continue his revolutionary work in the proletarian center of Ekaterinoslav.

== Revolutionary activity in Ekaterinoslav ==
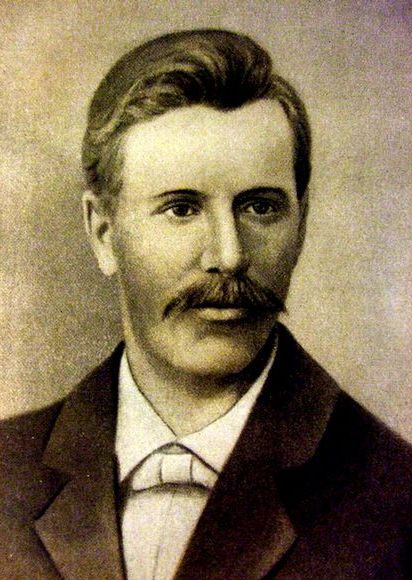
Ivan Babushkin in the 1890s.

Towards the end of September 1895, Isaak Lalayants moved to Ekaterinoslav with his wife and revolutionary Praskovia Ivanovna Kulyabko. On their way to Moscow, Lalayants meets with Lenin and receives a letter of recommendation from him. "On the same day," writes Lalayants, "he managed to get a letter for me to one of the responsible workers in the Ekaterinoslav Railroad Administration – this is already a part of presenting me with some earnings, which was very significant for me as someone under surveillance, moreover in a completely unfamiliar city".

In Ekaterinoslav –in the large workers' center of the south of Russia– Lalayants conducted large revolutionary work among factory and railway workers. He takes an active role in the creation of the local League of Struggle for the Emancipation of the Working Class and in the preparations for the first congress of the RSDLP.

In the early spring of 1897, Lalayants, together with Ivan Babushkin –a faithful pupil of Lenin exiled to Ekaterinoslav–, restore local Marxist circles (Lalayants leads the Ekaterinoslav "Central Social Democratic Group", and Babushkin, the workers' group) and in December 1897 unite them in one social democratic organisation called the Ekaterinoslav League of Struggle for the Emancipation of the Working Class. For three or four years, Babushkin, Lalayants, Grigory Petrovsky, Mikhail Tskhakaya, Kazymyr Adamovich Petrusevych, P. A. Morozov, and other experienced revolutionaries, under strict clandestinity, save the local social democratic organisation from failure.

Comrades of Lalayants in the underground struggle characterized him as a man with great organisational talent, who managed for several years to lead the Ekaterinoslav social democrats. Through Lalayants, Babushkin and others, the Ekaterinoslav League, closely associated with the St. Petersburg League, receives literature from them and distributes it.

Following the example of St. Petersburg League, the Ekaterinoslav League takes the path of transition to mass agitation; launches extensive organisational, agitation and propaganda activities among the workers, and seeks to expand its activities to neighboring cities, contributing to the emergence of social democratic circles in the Donbas.

In the publications and leaflets of the Ekaterinoslav League, widely distributed among the proletarians, the League talks about the urgent needs of the workers, the need for an organised struggle against tsarism and capitalism. Along with the St. Petersburg League, the Ekaterinoslav League is one of the first to start laying the revolutionary traditions of the mass social democratic labour movement.

In March 1898, Ekaterinoslav League representative Kazymyr Petrusevych attends the first congress of the RSDLP, which forms the Russian Social Democratic Labour Party. Returning to Ekaterinoslav after the congress, Petrusevych presents the resolutions of the congress to Lalayants and is arrested that same night. At a meeting of local social democrats, Lalayants reports on the first congress of the RSDLP. It is decided to reorganise the Ekaterinoslav League into the "Ekaterinoslav Committee of the Russian Social Democratic Labour Party".

In January 1899, the Ekaterinoslav social democrats, addressing the Ekaterinoslav workers with a special proclamation on the occasion of the First Congress, wrote: "So, comrades, we will strive hard for the best part and we will wholeheartedly rejoice at the emergence of the workers' party as a messenger of a better future".

After almost three years of staying and working in Ekaterinoslav, Lalayants goes to Tbilisi and Voronezh. At the end of the summer of 1899, he returns to Ekaterinoslav and resumes his work at the local party committee. Together with Ivan Babushkin and Mikhail Tskhakaya, he conducts a struggle against the so-called "Economists" to unite local social democrats on Marxist positions. At that time, the Ekaterinoslav Committee had about 25 propaganda circles, which united up to 200 advanced workers. The committee, led by Babushkin, Lalayants, Tskhakaya, and Grigory Petrovsky, educated them in the spirit of a political struggle for the fundamental interests of the working class, and directed the strike movement.

== Creation of Yuzhny Rabochy ==
In January 1900, on the initiative of Babushkin and Lalayants, the illegal social democrat newspaper Yuzhny Rabochy (The Southern Worker) begins to be published, which played an important role in the development of the revolutionary workers' movement in southern Russia. The first editors of Yuzhny Rabochy are Lalayants, A. A. Mashitsky and S. K. Kharchenko. "...In January 1900, the long-awaited newspaper Yuzhny Rabochy finally came out" recalls Ivan Babushkin. "At the workers' committee meeting it was partially read. [...] At the Bryansk factory, workers found one copy and were very surprised by the content: "Look, it's like a real newspaper! There, and even chronicles and correspondence!" And then they went to a secluded place to read the newspaper. This first newspaper remained in their memory for a long time and raised the mood, as they saw that, in spite of the arrests, the activity not only did not decrease, but, on the contrary, everything became more skillful and strong".

In March 1900, Lalayants Met with Lenin in Moscow and agreed on a number of issues, including the organisation of the second congress of the RSDLP abroad. "Approximately in the middle of March," Lalayants recalls, "I think, having previously agreed, I went to Moscow, directly to the Ulyanovs'. Vladimir Ilyich and I found ourselves at home; these days he lived in Moscow, with his family, and, it seems, by special permission, since after exile he was forbidden to stay in Moscow and St. Petersburg. There is no need to say how happy it was for us to meet again after almost five years of being apart. During this time, so much accumulated about what to tell, not to mention the main reason for which I came. The two days with him and his family flew completely unnoticed for me. Vladimir Ilyich was extremely attentive to my information about the state of affairs in the south in general and especially in Ekaterinoslav".

== Arrest, exile and escape from Siberia ==
Lalayants responds warmly to Lenin's plan for the creation of the newspaper Iskra and the gathering of the party around this newspaper. In April 1900, shortly after returning from a detour about the convocation of the second party congress, Lalayants is arrested and, among others, sent to Kiev's Lukyanivska Prison, and then to the Moscow's Taganka and Butyrka prisons, where he stays until the spring of 1902. In March 1902, Lalayants is sent to exile to Eastern Siberia, but he does not reach his destination. He stops at Balagansk, Irkutsk Governorate, where, thanks to the care of Lenin, he receives a passport, money, and, through Samara, Saratov and Vilna in early July 1902, flees abroad to Berlin and then Zürich.

"I stayed in Samara for about a day," recalls Lalayants. "Maria Ilyinichna Ulyanova met me there, who gave me additional instructions, instructions, etc. on the journey ahead to the border and abroad; she also arranged for me to spend the night somewhere, I remember, at a dacha near Samara, with her good friends. However there, it seems, I did not meet with anyone, for purely conspiratorial reasons. In Saratov, where I went by boat from Samara to meet there with my wife and continue the journey together with her, I did not stay long. I managed, however, to dress in a "liberal" suit just in case, and almost the same day I went from there together with Praskovia Ivanovna directly to Vilna".

During all these years, Lenin had been tirelessly following Lalayants's life and revolutionary activities, and is in correspondence with him. On 18 May 1897, in a letter from the village of Shushenskoye to Moscow, to his mother Maria Alexandrovna and sister Maria Ilyinichna, Lenin asks: "What news is there of Columbus? I have heard that he is married and is ill. Do you know anything about him?" In October of the same year, in a letter to his mother, Lenin says: "The doctor (from the north) asks me to give you his regards. (I correspond with him and Columbus fairly regularly)".

== Activity in Geneva ==
On request of the party and personally Lenin, Lalayants moves to Geneva, where he continues his revolutionary work. He knows that in the near future the editorial board of Iskra and Lenin would move from London to Geneva. "In those years," writes Lalayants, "in Geneva there lived a mass of Russians of all ages and all views, ranging from radical democratic to the socialist revolutionary, anarchist and social democratic elements. Of course, the young people were predominantly socialist, predominantly revolutionary. The abundance of Russians (more precisely, the Russians) gave even a special imprint to the entire city, and the 'Russians' (the Swiss-Genevans poured out all natives of Russia, regardless of their nationality, into one bunch: the 'Russians'), once in Geneva, they began to feel 'at home'. It was not for nothing that some jokers suggested renaming Geneva to "the city of Geneva, the Swiss province"... On the other hand, it was already at that time that Geneva became the largest and most vibrant center of Russian foreign political life in comparison with other European cities.

While in Geneva, Lalayants gets acquainted with the latest Marxist literature, reads Iskra and Zarya, studies Lenin's book What Is To Be Done? (1902), often meets and talks with Georgi Plekhanov, and is in correspondence with Lenin. "Lenin's book What Is To Be Done?," writes Lalayants, "twenty-two already published numbers of Iskra, two books of the magazine Zarya and some other things, and, finally, the mentioned project of the party program of Iskra and Zarya, on one hand. On the other hand, quite frequent conversations with Plekhanov on various topics and the correspondence with Lenin gave me the opportunity, before being separated from living life for more than two years, in a relatively short time, to become familiar with the state of affairs, to get acquainted in detail with the direction of Iskra and their views on the program, tactics and organization".

At Lenin's suggestion, Lalayants and Praskovia Kulyabko are admitted to the League of Russian Revolutionary Social Democracy Abroad, joining the Leninist group of assistance to the Iskra organisation. In Geneva, Lalayants is in charge of the printing house of Iskra, he leads circles among the Russian student colony and the Iskra support groups. "In the winter and spring of 1902–03," writes Lalayants, "I had several circles of self-education and propaganda, consisting mainly of Russian students, a very revolutionary and very sympathetic social democracy of the Iskra trend...".

Lenin is very interested in the activities of Lalayants and gives him instructions. In a letter to Plekhanov, dated 19 December 1902, Lenin expresses his concern over a member of the printing house: "Levinson is threatening to leave because Lalayants was made manager of the printery and he has quarreled with him. I wrote Lalayants asking him to "smooth" things out. Perhaps you too could help to calm down Levinson and impress it on Lalayants to handle him "with care". I am sending to the printers (to Lalayants) the beginning of the translation of Kautsky and a popular pamphlet on army life. Please look through it at least in proofs".

In a letter dated 28 January 1903, Lenin asks through Plekhanov that Lalayants or someone else translates and sends to London relevant materials from the Armenian Marxist newspaper of Leninist-Iskraist trend Proletariat, organ of the Union of Armenian Social Democrats. "I am sending you Proletariat as well." writes Lenin, "Please ask Lalayants or somebody else to translate in full everything in it about nationalism and federalism and send it to me as soon as possible. An item on this should be published without fail (the piece sent in needs editing and for this we must have the text)".

After the second congress of the RSDLP, Lenin, through a confident and himself, returning to Geneva, informs Lalayants about the work of the congress and gives him a number of instructions; to go to Russia and to acquaint the Central Committee and the Southern Committees in detail about the whole course of events in connection with the split between Bolsheviks and Mensheviks at the congress. "There is no need to say with what intense, unflagging attention I followed all the way to the very end of the story of Vladimir Ilyich" recalls Lalayants.

== Return to Russia ==
In this difficult period for the party, Lalayants, along with Rosalia Zemlyachka, Nikolay Bauman, Elena Stasova, Maxim Litvinov, Sergey Ivanovich Gusev, Lydia Knipovich, and other professional Bolshevik revolutionaries, endure on their shoulders the main burden of the struggle against the Mensheviks in Russia.

Lalayants returned to Russia immediately after the congress. Via Lyon, Paris and Berlin, he goes to Kiev, where he meets with Gleb Krzhizhanovsky, member of the Central Committee, and the Ulyanov family. "The mission then was assigned to me by Lenin and Lengnik," writes Lalayants, "to immediately go to Russia, to acquaint the Central Committee as fully as possible on the entire course of events that took place before the opening of the League Congress, during the Congress itself and in the early days of its closure, and in every possible way insist on the speedy departure from Geneva of Krzhizhanovsky and yet another member of the Central Committee. My departure from Geneva took place four or five days after the end of the Congress of the League and the turn of Plekhanov, on November 4 or 5, 1903".

"The late Knunyants (Ruben-Rusov)," continues Lalayants, "one of the Caucasian delegates at the second congress of the party, supplied me with his "own" passport in the name of some Persian subject named Jean Jacob Leon... At the address given to me, I went to meet Krzhizhanovsky. I told him in a few words about the purpose of my visit. We agreed to meet that same evening at the meeting together with the other available members of the Central Committee, at which I would give detailed information. After parting till evening, I went with the proper precautions to search for the Ulyanov family, who also lived in Kiev at the time, and with whom I had not seen each other for about four years (since my talks with Vladimir Ilyich in Moscow in March 1900 about the then proposed convocation of the second congress). I found only Maria Alexandrovna and Anna Ilyinichna at home. After a lively conversation, parting, Anna Ilyinichna and I meet again before my departure from Kiev to go to the meeting place, at her suggestion, at Vladimir Cathedral. In the evening, as was agreed with Krzhizhanovsky, I arrived at the designated place; there were five or six people at that time completely unknown to me. I spoke in the most detailed manner about the recent events abroad, answered a number of questions asked to me in connection with my information, constantly telling me again and again the importance and the need for the speedy departure to Geneva of two members of the Central Committee, including necessarily Krzhizhanovsky."

On the advice of Lenin, in February 1904, the agents of the Central Committee of the party Vatslav Vorovsky, Lalayants, Kulyabko and K. O. Levitsky, create the Southern Bureau of the Central Committee of the RSDLP in Odessa, which unites the work of the Odessa, Ekaterinoslav, and Nikolayev committees and establishes links with the Northern Bureau.

The Southern Bureau launches an active campaign for the convocation of the third RSDLP congress. Lalayants is at the center of this all-party work. He takes an active part in the compilation, printing and distribution of the detailed resolution of the Odessa Committee of the RSDLP, which sharply condemns "both the nature of the struggle of the Mensheviks and the methods used by them in this struggle". It is pointed out that the only way out of this 'intolerable situation' is "the fastest convocation of the Third Congress, which alone can put an end to this completely abnormal state". The Odessa Committee urges the rest of the party's committees to adhere to its demand for the convocation of the Third Congress.

In June 1904, Lalayants is again arrested and in January 1905 exiled to the Vologda Governorate, but again flees and arrives at the end of spring in St. Petersburg.

Lalayants was an active participant in the Russian Revolution of 1905. After the Third Party Congress, he is co-opted into the Bolshevik Central Committee, and on the instructions of Lenin, he unites a whole series of Party committees and instructs them. In 1906, as a member of the Central Committee, Lalayants leads a great deal of work in military organisations. After a short stay abroad (at the beginning of 1906), he works in St. Petersburg for the Narva outpost; as a member of the Petersburg Committee, he edits its organ-newspaper Kazarma. Lalayants is one of the main organisers and chairman of the first conference of the military organisations of the party in Tammerfors (Tampere), where he makes a report on the role of the party in the armed uprising. Lenin closely follows the progress of the conference, giving a positive assessment of his work.

== Exile to Irkutsk and illness ==
In December 1906, Lalayants was arrested and after two years of pre-trial detention, he was convicted to 6 years of hard labour, serving in the St. Petersburg remand prison and in the Shlisselburg Fortress. At the end of 1913, he is exiled to an eternal settlement in Eastern Siberia: the Biryulskaya Volost of Verkholensky District, Irkutsk Governorate.

In the fall of 1914, Lalayants settles in Irkutsk, where he lives until 1921. Hard labour has made him severely ill, and has since withdrawn from the party and politics.

On a letter to Joseph Stalin, dated 20 October 1921, Lenin wrote:

I knew Lalayants from the 1890s on as a Marxist and then a Bolshevik. He is undoubtedly a loyal revolutionary, who must be used despite our political differences.

— V. I. Lenin, "Letter to J. V. Stalin", V. I. Lenin Collected Works (Vol. 45) (1970)

At the end of 1921, Lenin summons Lalayants to Moscow, showing concern for him and paying him much attention.

== Return to politics and final years ==
From 1922, Lalayants worked in the Main Political Administration of the People's Commissariat for Education. In the last years of his life he writes his memoirs of Lenin and the party, from the very beginning of the birth of Bolshevism, to the struggle of Lenin's leadership for the creation and consolidation of party organisations.

He retired in 1929.

Isaak Khristoforovich Lalayants died on 14 July 1933 after a long illness. In a pamphlet published in Pravda, with the signature of Maria Ilyinichna Ulyanova, Dmitry Ilyich Ulyanov, V. Vishnyak and other old Bolsheviks, it was written: "For a number of years since the beginning of the 1890s, Lalayants was one of Lenin's comrades-in-arms and friend. ...Both at work, and in prison, exile and hard labour, Lalayants enjoyed universal respect and love. Strict to others, he was especially strict towards himself. It can be said that before the revolution he was one of Lenin's best students and associates. Prison and penal servitude undermined the health of Lalayants and he had to quit his job soon. Lalayants's name is connected with the pre-revolutionary struggle of the Bolsheviks against the Narodniks and against the Mensheviks for the Leninist line. His great erudition, his solid theoretical godliness, his ardent revolutionary temperament put him in the forefront of revolutionary Social-Democracy".

Isaak Lalayants is buried at the Novodevichy Cemetery.

== Memorials ==
- A street in Kizlyar, Lalayants's birthplace, bears his name.
- Another street in Makhachkala, capital of Dagestan, is also named after him.

== Works ==
- At the Origins of Bolshevism (1930)
