= Maria Ulyanova =

Maria Ulyanova may refer to:

- Maria Alexandrovna Ulyanova (1835–1916), mother of Vladimir Lenin
- Maria Ilyinichna Ulyanova (1878–1937), younger sister of Vladimir Lenin
