= Ulanovsky =

Ulanovsky is a surname. Notable people with the surname include:

- Alexander Ulanovsky (1891–1970), Soviet spy

== See also ==
- Ulyanovsky (disambiguation)
