= Ulyanovsky District =

One of two districts in Russia

Location of Kaluga Oblast

Location of Ulyanovsk Oblast

Ulyanovsky District is the name of several administrative and municipal districts in Russia:

- Ulyanovsky District, Kaluga Oblast, an administrative and municipal district of Kaluga Oblast
- Ulyanovsky District, Ulyanovsk Oblast, an administrative and municipal district of Ulyanovsk Oblast

== See also ==
- Ulyanovsky (disambiguation)
