= Blank family =

Family of Vladimir Lenin's maternal grandfather

The Blank family in the Russian Empire was the family of the maternal great-grandfather of Vladimir Lenin.

After Lenin's death, researchers found evidence that Lenin's maternal great-grandfather was a Jewish convert to Christianity (Moshe Blank). Some researchers have argued the family was of German origin, and invited to Russia by Catherine the Great. It is possible that such debated concern that Alexander Blank may have had Jewish origin were spread for partly political reasons. An important contribution into Lenin’s genealogical and political connections to East European Jews were done by Yohanan Petrovsky-Shtern who states that there is indisputable evidence that Lenin’s maternal grandfather was Jewish. Petrovsky-Shtern also researched the continuous efforts of the Soviet communists to suppress Lenin's Jewishness and the no less persistent attempts of Russian nationalists to portray Lenin as a Jew.

== Moshko (Dmitry) Blank ==
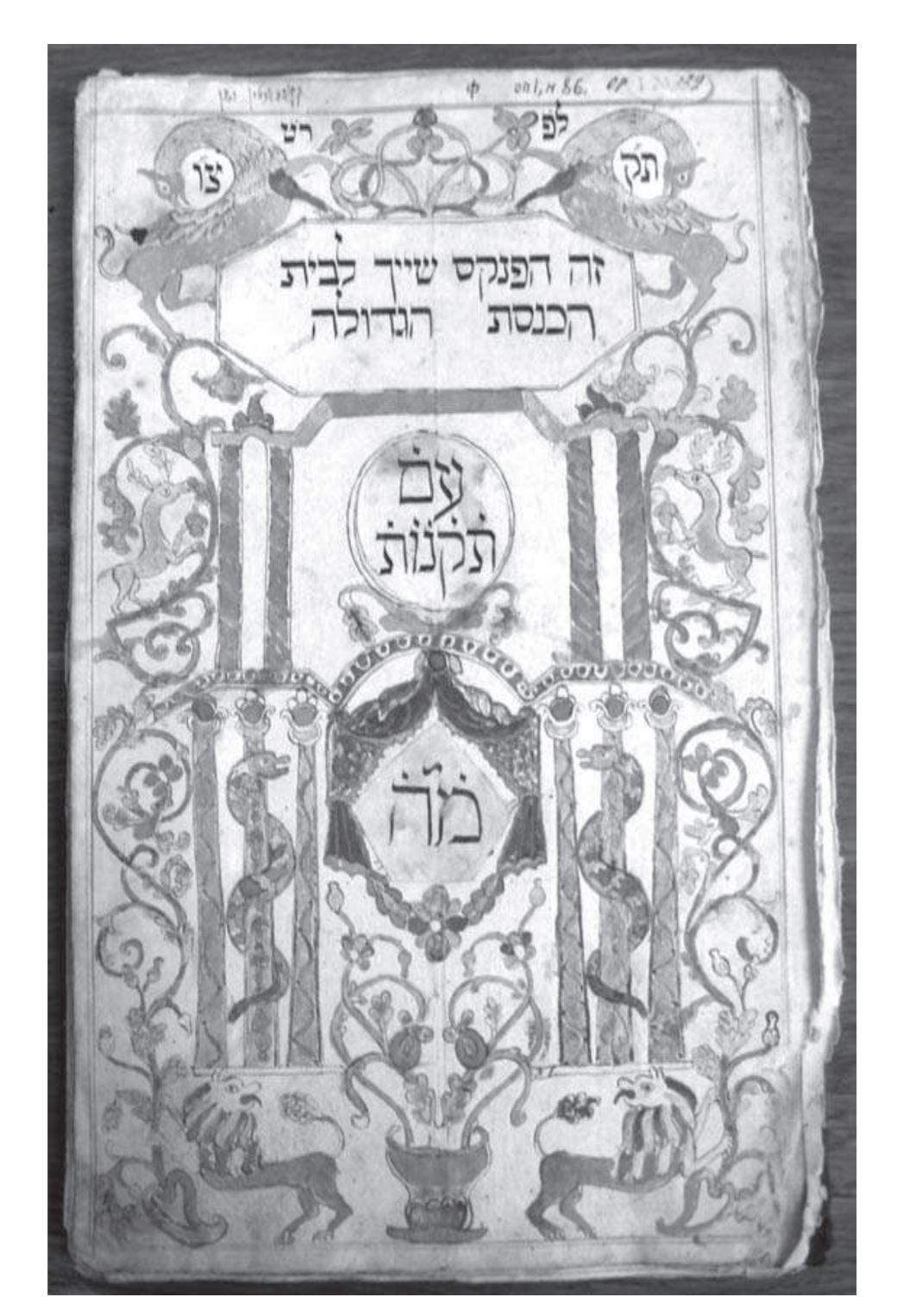
Record Book of the Great Synagogue of Starokonstantinov

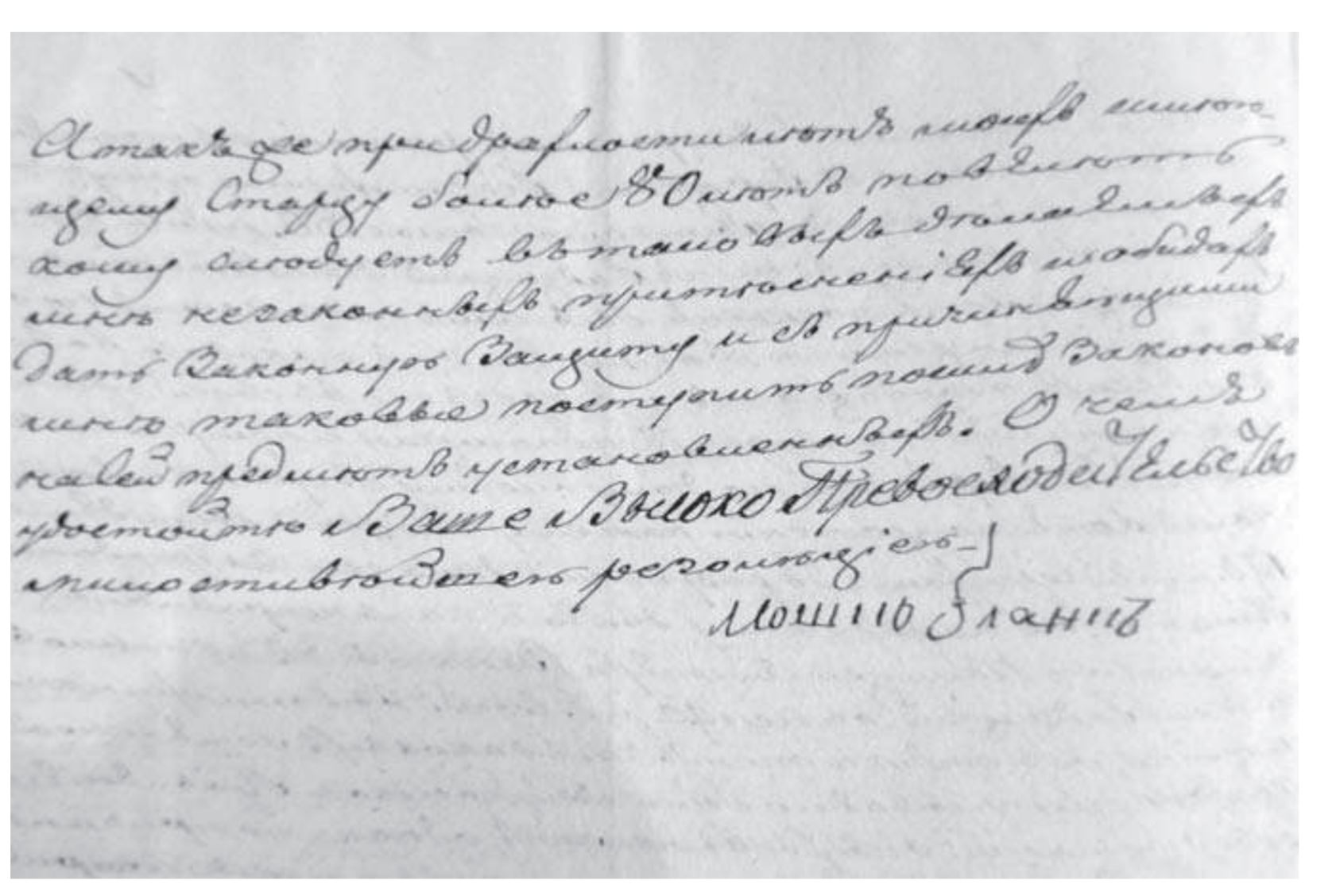
Moshko Blank’s signature in Russian at the bottom of his complaint of the arbitrary decision of the provincial court

Moshko (or Moshe) Itzkovich Blank (Russian: Мойша Ицкович Бланк) baptized as Dmitry Blank (c. 1760-after 1844) was a Jewish vodka-franchised tavern keeper from Shtetl Starokonstantynów, Volhynian Voivodeship (now Ukraine).

He was born between 1758 and 1763. His place of birth is unknown. He was presumably an Ashkenazic, Yiddish-speaking Jew, born to a traditional Jewish family in the pre-partitioned Polish–Lithuanian Commonwealth. Blank was not a normative Polish-Jewish last name, but not a rarity either: quite a number of Jews in Starokonstantinovo had that last name. Miriam Froimovich Blank, Moshko’s wife and Lenin’s great-grandmother, was a native of Starokonstantinovo, born about 1763. She also presumably came from an Ashkenazic Jewish family. Her last name is an adaptation of her patronymics, as her father's first name, Froim, Yiddish for Efraim. Miriam Blank most likely gave birth to a number of children, but only three of them survived: Abel, born in 1794, Liba, born around 1798, and Yisroel born in 1804.

Blank was not a practising Jew. Similarly, he did not enroll his own children into Jewish schools. Moshko claimed that his tavern in Starokonastantinovo brought him around 10 silver roubles per week that was probably a strong exaggeration. He also rented a plot of land in Novograd-Volynsky Uyezd, Volhynian Governorate where he grew chicory. He sent his sons into a secular Russian school instead of a traditional religious Jewish cheder which was unusual in those times.

Most of his life story is known through the documents related to his complicated feud with the local kahal. In 1803, the kahal accused Moshe of stealing hay; in 1805, they accused him of selling cheaper ordinary vodka as a more expensive "fruit vodka" brand. The official courts cleared Moshe on both counts. In 1806, Moshe, in turn, accused the kahal of shielding local Jews from taxes and their children from conscription into the Russian Army. In 1808, 22 local Jews accused Moshe Blank of arson that destroyed or damaged many houses in Starokonastantinovo, including the Blanks' own house. Some researchers believe that the arson charges were true and that Blank indeed was a pyromaniac, while others consider the charges as a false report done as a revenge for his reports. In 1809, Novohrad-Volynian magistrate cleared Blank from the arson charges, but the family had to move to Zhitomir.

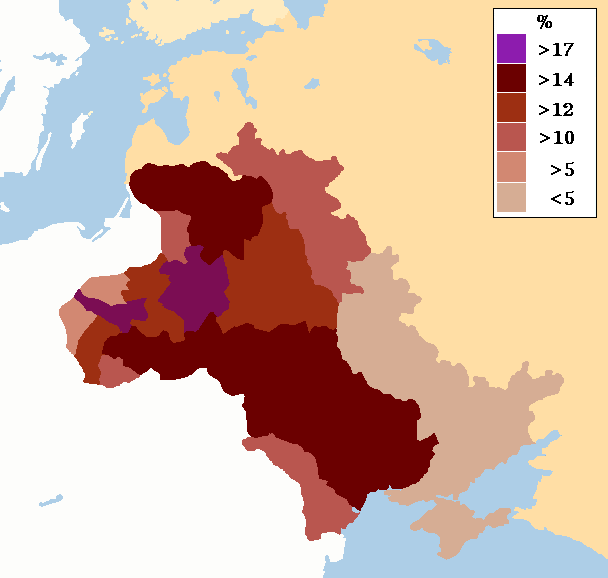
Concentration of Jewish population in the Pale of Settlement

In November 1816, Moshe Blank sued his son, Abel Blank, alleging that his son had beaten and verbally abused him over a monetary dispute - Moshe promised to pay some dowry after Abel's marriage but changed his mind afterwards. Abel was arrested and threatened with exile to Siberia, but eventually after the Blanks neighbors gave the best possible character assessment of the son and the worst possible of the father, Abel was cleared from the charges and Moshe fined for the false report.

On 10 July 1820, in Saint Petersburg, two sons of Moshe: Abel and Srul were baptized into Orthodox Christianity. At the time in Russia, conversion of Jews was a rare and a high profile event. The godfathers of the sons were senator Dmitry Baranov and the Actual Privy Counsellor Alexander Apraksin. Both of the sons were named after their godfathers and received patronymics after Dmitry Baranov. Thus, Abel Moshevich became Dmitry Dmitrievich and Srul Moshevich became Alexander Dmitrievich. The same year, the brothers were admitted to the Saint Petersburg Academy of Medical Surgeons (Петербургская Медико-Хирургическая Академия). According to the customs of the time, conversions to Christianity meant breaking of the family connections.

In 1825, Moshe Blank finally won his litigation with the Starokonstantinovo Jews; he received more than 15 thousand roubles distributed among the 22 plaintiffs as a compensation for his losses, while 11 of the plaintiffs were imprisoned for libel. The lucky turn of the litigation was probably influenced by the powerful godfathers of Moshe's sons

On 1 January 1845, at the age of 86, Moshe Blank also converted to Christianity. He was baptized Dmitry, probably matching the patronymics of his sons. He wrote letters to the Emperor Nicholas I (there are known letters of 7 June 1845 and 18 September 1846 acknowledging that he had broken with the Jews for 40 years but could only convert after the death of his "very religious wife"). In his letters, he advocated to significantly tighten the limitation for the religious Jews: to forbid prayers for the coming of Moshiach, but instead require every Saturday to pray for the Tsar and his family; to forbid Hasidic Judaism and visits of Jewish houses by rabbis; to forbid non-Jews employed by the Jews to work on Saturdays and so on. According to Blank, the new requirements would greatly increase conversion of the Jews and would make Government payments of 30 roubles to each convert unnecessary. Robert Service in his biography on Lenin notes that Moshe Blank was an "anti-semite" and that by stressing Russian nationalist agenda through "an emphasis upon the Jewish connections of Lenin," contemporary writers "avoid the plain fact that Moshko Blank was an enemy of Judaism and that no specific aspect of their Jewish background remained important for his children.".

There is no information on the last years of Moshe Blank.

== Abel (Dmitry) Blank ==
Abel Moshevich Blank (Russian: Абель Мошевич Бланк) baptized as Dmitry Dmitrievich Blank after his godfather senator Dmitry Baranov (1794-26 June 1831) was a Russian-Jewish medical doctor, son of Moshe (Dmitry) Blank.

After his conversion to the Russian Orthodox Church, in 1820, Dmitry was admitted to the Saint Petersburg Academy of Medical Surgeons which he graduated in 1824. Dmitry worked as a medical doctor and was murdered on 26 June 1831 during the infamous Cholera Mutiny in Saint Petersburg: the lynching mob decided that the cholera epidemic in the city was caused by the actions of the medical doctors and quarantine officials. Among the murdered, there was doctor Dmitry (Abel) Blank who was defenestrated by the mob from his own office on the third floor of the Central Cholera Hospital.

== Srul (Alexander) Blank ==
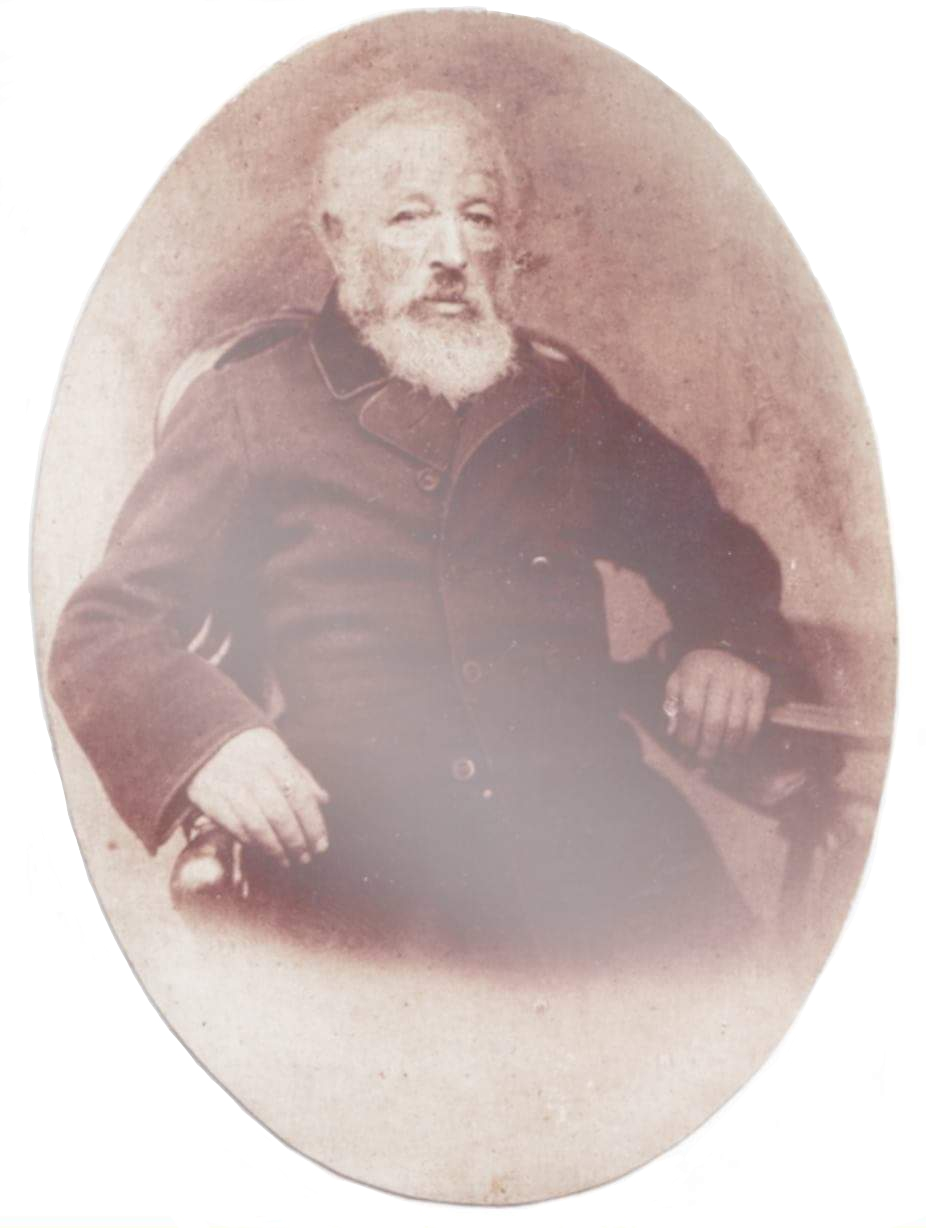
Alexander Blank

Srul Moshevich Blank (Russian: Сруль Мошевич Бланк) also spelled Israil Moiseevich Blank (Russian: Израиль Моисеевич Бланк) baptized Alexander Dmitrievich Blank (Александр Дмитриевич Бланк); (1804–17 July 1870) was a Russian medical doctor and a landowner, the younger son of Moshe Blank and a grandfather of Vladimir Lenin.

According to the mainstream theory, Srul was born in Starokonstantinovo and converted to Orthodox Christianity together with his brother in Saint Petersburg in 1820. He was baptized Alexander, after his godfather Actual Privy Counsellor Alexander Ivanovich Apraksin, and got the patronymic Dmitrievich after his brother's godfather, Dmitry Baranov. On 24 July 1818, Alexander entered the Saint Petersburg Academy of Medical Surgeons.

On 19 July 1824, Alexander Blank graduated from medical school with a diploma as surgeon-obstetrician. He worked in the town of Porechye Smolensk Governorate. Soon, he returned to Saint Petersburg and worked as a police medical doctor, then in the Naval Department; in 1837, he started to work in Mariinsky Hospital. In 1842, he moved to Perm, then Zlatoust.

In 1847, he retired from the practice of medicine and bought the estate of Kokushkino or Yañasala (now Lenino-Kokushkino) in Tatarstan with 39 male serfs, where he lived until his death in 1870. In 1887–1888, Vladimir Lenin was exiled to his grandfather's estate.

Alexander Blank was a doctor of the great Ukrainian poet Taras Shevchenko. In 1837, in Saint Petersburg, he reportedly saved Shevchenko (then a young pupil of artist Shiryayev) from a dangerous illness. Later, in the 1850s, during his exile to Nizhny Novgorod, Shevchenko was afflicted with an "indecent illness out of his romance with actress Pekunova" (most probably a sort of a sexually transmitted disease). Shevchenko sent for the retired doctor Alexander Blank who was able to cure him.

Alexander Blank married twice. His first wife was Anna Großschopf (Анна Ивановна Гроссшопф). They had one son, Dmitry, who committed suicide at the age of 19 because of a gambling debt and five daughters: Anna, Lyubov, Yekaterina, Maria and Sofia. Each of the five daughters married a school teacher and left five to ten children. The fourth daughter, Maria married Ilya Ulyanov and became the mother of Vladimir Lenin.

Anna Großschopf was half-German and half-Swedish; her German ancestors came from Northern Germany and that branch of the family produced many notable Germans who were discovered to be distant relatives of Vladimir Lenin. Among them are Nazi field marshal Walter Model, German archeologist Ernst Curtius, President of Germany Richard von Weizsäcker and many others. Her Swedish ancestors came from Stockholm, Uppsala, and Kristinehamn. Her parents were Johann Gottlieb Grosschopff and Anna Beata Östedt.

In 1838, Anna Großschopf died and Alexander Blank married the widow of a government official of XII class, Yekaterina Ivanovna Essen (1842). The second marriage was childless.

== Later generations ==
The Blank daughters married becoming Veretennikova, Ulyanova, Zalezhsky, Lavrova, and Ardasheva. All of those families had many children. Currently, there are known 130 descendants of Alexander Blank.

The most notable is the family of Maria Alexandrovna Blank who married Ilya Ulyanov and mothered Vladimir Lenin (born Vladimir Ulyanov). Lenin's having had eighth-Jewish heritage tends to be spotlighted by authors who subscribe to the antisemitic Jewish Bolshevism conspiracy theory linking Judaism and Communism. It is possible that the argument that Alexander Blank had Jewish origin was spread for partly political reasons. In spite of the historical evidence mentioned above, there is dispute among historians in Russia about whether or not he may have had such an origin.

Victor Ardashev, a first cousin of Vladimir Lenin, was a member of the Constitutional Democratic Party from Verkhoturye, Perm Governorate. After the dispersion of the Russian Constituent Assembly, he published a critical proclamation and was murdered (under pretext of attempts to escape) by Yakov Yurovsky in February 1918. Incidentally, the same Yurovsky was the chief executioner of the last Russian Emperor Nicholas II.

Alexander Ardashev, brother of Victor and another first cousin of Vladimir Lenin, was also arrested by Cheka but released after a request by Lenin.

Georgy Ardashev, a son of Alexander Ardashev and a first cousin once removed of Vladimir Lenin, was a Praporshchik and a commander of a cavalry squadron in Yekaterinburg garrison. In 1918, he refused to disperse an anti-Bolshevik soldier assembly and was executed by Cheka the same night.

Nicholas Pervukhin, a grandson of Zalezhsky and another Lenin first cousin once removed, was arrested by Cheka and allowed to emigrate to Canada after a letter from Dmitri Ulyanov, a younger brother of Vladimir Lenin, who at that time stopped all the revolutionary activities and worked as a medical doctor. It appeared that Cheka mixed up Dmitri with Vladimir Lenin. He later worked for the United Nations as a Russian interpreter and incidentally provided the synchronized translation during the famed Nikita Khrushchev's shoe-banging incident.

== Bibliography ==
- Petrovsky-Shtern, Alexander (2010). Lenin's Jewish Question. Yale University Press. ISBN 9780300152104.
