= Artur Nepokoychitsky =

Russian (born Polish) imperial military leader

Artur Adamovich Nepokoychitsky
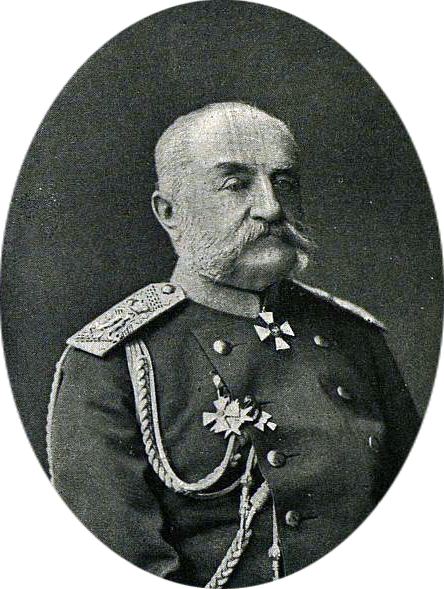
- General Artur Nepokoychitsky in 1877.
- Born: 20 December [O.S. 8] 1813; Slutsk, Minsk Governorate, Russian Empire
- Died: 23 November [O.S. 11] 1881 (aged 67); Saint Petersburg, Russian Empire
- Burial place: Volkovo Cemetery
- Military career
- Allegiance: Russian Empire
- Branch: Imperial Russian Army
- Service years: 1832 – 1881
- Rank: General of the Infantry
- Conflicts: Caucasian War; Hungarian Revolution of 1848; Crimean War; Russo-Turkish War

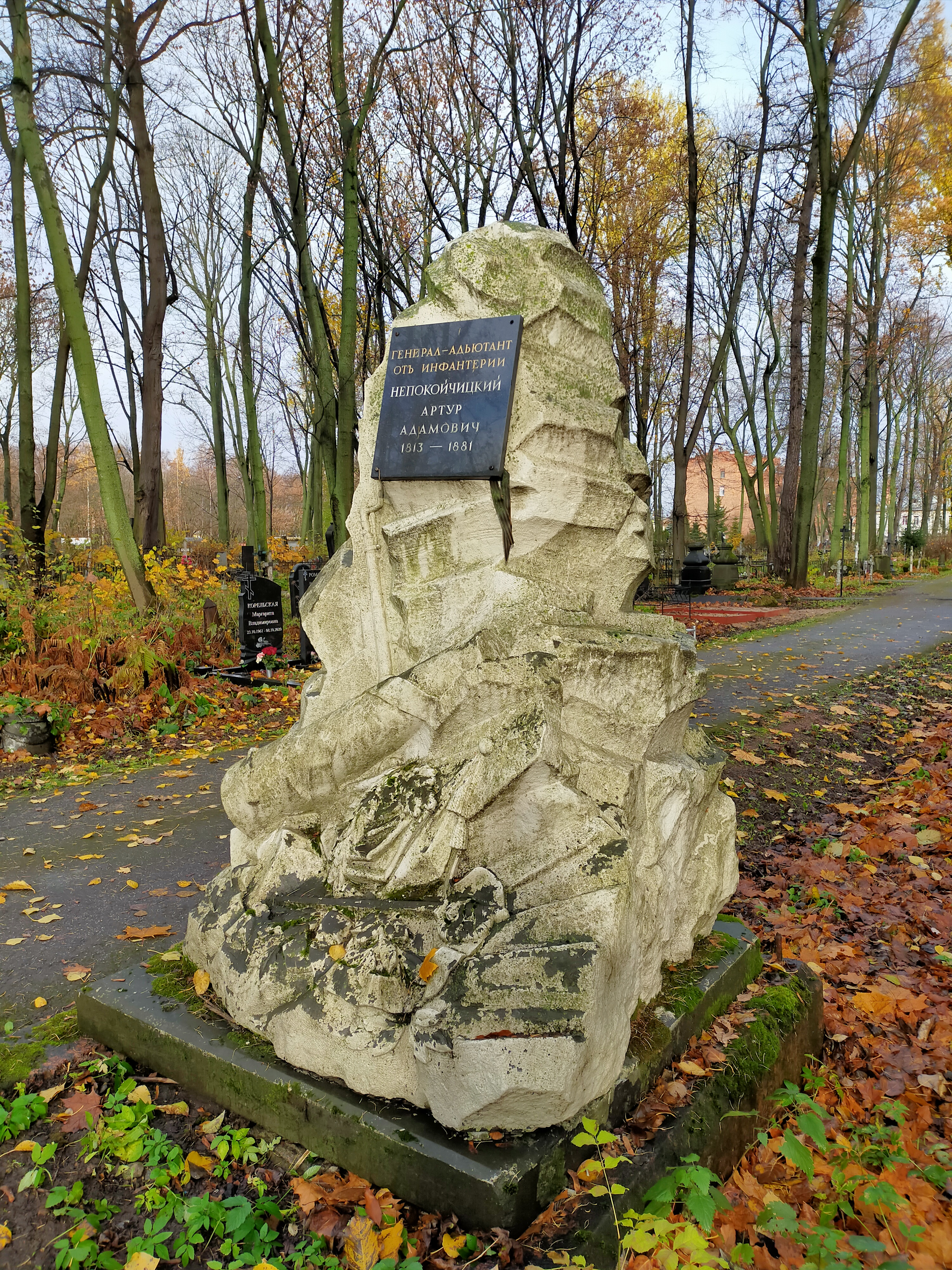
General Nepokoychitsky monument in the Volkovo lutheran cemetery

Artur Adamovich Nepokoychitsky (Russian: Артур Адамович Непокойчицкий; Russian (before 1918): Артуръ Адамовичъ Непокойчицкій; Polish: Artur Niepokojczycki; 20 December [O.S. 8] 1813 – 23 November [O.S. 11] 1881) was an Imperial Russian military leader of Polish extraction. A participant of the Crimean War and Russo-Turkish War, he was the chief of staff to Grand Duke Nicholas Nikolaevich of Russia during the Russo-Turkish War, until his dismissal at the end of the war.

He joined the Page Corps before being promoted to the Preobrazhensky Regiment. From 1841 he served on the General Staff and participated in military operations in Chechnya and Dagestan. In 1849, he ran of the headquarters of General Alexander von Lüders which went to Transylvania. Nepokoychitsky distinguished himself during the occupation of Sibiu.

== Honours and awards ==
=== Domestic ===
- Order of St. Anna, 2nd class with swords (13.10.1844, swords on 8.21.1845)
- Order of St. Vladimir, 4th class with a bow (12.4.1845)
- Order of St. Stanislaus, 2nd class with swords (23.4.1841, swords on 1.7.1845)
- Order of St. Vladimir, 3rd class with swords (12.10.1849)
- Order of St. Stanislaus, 1st class with swords (12.10.1850)
- Order of St. Anna, 1st class with imperial crown (18.8.1851, imperial crowns on 28.9.1852)
- Order of St. George, 4th class (1.2.1852)
- Order of St. Vladimir, 2nd class with swords (30.7.1854)
- Gold sword with diamonds and the inscription "For Bravery" (29.12.1854)
- Order of the White Eagle (26.8.1856)
- Order of St. Alexander Nevsky with diamonds signs (27.3.1866, diamonds signs in 17.4.1870)
- Order of St. George, 3rd class (15.6.1877)
- Order of St. George, 2nd class (29.11.1877)
- Order of St. Vladimir, 1st class with swords (16.4.1878)

=== Foreign ===
- Austrian Empire:
  - Order of the Iron Crown, 2nd class (2.7.1849)
- Grand Duchy of Mecklenburg-Schwerin:
  - Military Merit Cross, 1st class (8.8.1877)
- Kingdom of Prussia:
  - Pour le Mérite (26.4.1878)
- Kingdom of Romania:
  - Order of the Star of Romania, Great Cross with swords (23.1.1878)
  - Cross "For crossing the Danube" (?.11.1878)
- Kingdom of Serbia:
  - Order of the Cross of Takovo, "Grand Cross" (25.5.1878)
  - Serbian gold medal "For Bravery" (25.5.1878)
- Principality of Montenegro:
  - Montenegrin gold medal "For Bravery" (1878)
