= Pakhomy Andreyushkin =

Russian revolutionary

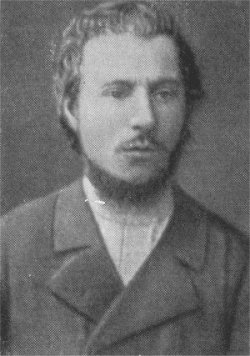
- Born: May 15, 1865; Russia
- Died: May 8, 1887 (aged 21); Shlisselburg Fortress, Russia
- Cause of death: Execution by hanging

Pakhomy Ivanovich Andreyushkin (May 15, 1865 – May 8, 1887) was a Russian revolutionary, member of Narodnaya Volya ("People's Will"), a secret terrorist organization meant to overthrow the Russian tsar.

In 1886, Andreyushkin enrolled in St. Petersburg University. That same year, he became a member of the "Terrorist Faction" of Narodnaya Volya and, together with Aleksandr Ulyanov and others, took part in planning the assassination of Tsar Alexander III.

Andreyushkin was arrested on March 1, 1887. On May 8, he was executed at the Schlüsselburg Fortress, one week before his 22nd birthday.
