= Yuzhny Rabochy =

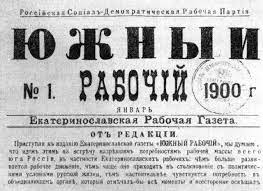
Yuzhny Rabochy; №1. 1900

Yuzhny Rabochy (Russian: Южный рабочий, IPA: [ˈjuʐnɨj rɐˈbot͡ɕɪj], "Southern Worker") was a Social-Democratic group formed in the South of Russia in the autumn of 1900 around an illegal newspaper of that name. Among the members of the group and the editors of the paper were, at various times, Isaak Lalayants, A. Vilensky, O. A. Kogan, B. S. Zeitlin, Y. Y. and Y. S. Levin, and V. N. Rozanov.

== Early formation ==
The group, which revolved around a newspaper of the same name, emerged in 1899 as a number of Jewish socialist activists had moved to the city; M. Dushkan, M. Frankfurt, I. Vilensky and A. M. Ginzburg (the latter two having moved from Vitebsk). The publication sought to fill the void created after the arrest of the editorial board of the Kiev based labour press. The bundist Ginzburg served as the editor of the publication from 1900 to 1902. The first issue of the publication was published in January 1900 by the Ekaterinoslav Committee of the Russian Social Democratic Labour Party, the twelfth and last in April 1903. The paper was distributed in different Ukrainian cities, especially in Kharkov. As Ekatarinoslav quickly became an epicentre of the Social Democratic movement in southern Russia, Yuzhny Rabochy emerged as a rival to Iskra for the role as the main party organ. However, at the early stage of the publication Yuzhny Rabochy held a positive view of Iskra and had invited Lenin to join its editorial team.

== Goals ==
In contrast to the Economists, the Yuzhny Rabochy group considered the overthrow of the autocracy the political struggle of the proletariat to be the prime task; they opposed terrorism, upheld the need to develop a mass revolutionary movement, and carried out extensive revolutionary activities in the South of Russia. At the same time, they overestimated the role of the liberal bourgeoisie and ignored the importance of the peasant movement. As against the Iskra plan of building a centralised Marxist party by uniting all revolutionary Social-Democrats around Iskra, the Yuzhny Rabochy group advocated a plan of restoring the Party by creating regional Social-Democratic associations. A practical attempt to carry out this plan was made through convening in December 1901 a conference of the Party committees and organisations of the South, at which a League of Southern Committees and Organisations of the R.S.D.L.P. was formed, with Yuzhny Rabochy as its press organ.

== Disruption ==
The attempt proved impracticable, and following wholesale arrests in the spring of 1902, the League fell to pieces. In August 1902 those Yuzhny Rabochy members who remained at liberty entered into negotiations with the Iskra editorial board about working together to restore Party unity. The group's statement of solidarity with Iskra (published in No. 27 of Iskra, November 1, 1902, and in No. 10 of Yuzhny Rabochy, December 1902) was of much importance in consolidating the Social-Democratic forces. In November 1902 Yuzhny Rabochy joined with the Iskra organisation in Russia and the St. Petersburg Committee and Northern League of the R.S.D.L.P. in establishing the Organising Committee for convening the Second Party Congress, and they shared in that committee’s work. But in this period too the group did not adhere to the consistent revolutionary line and evinced separatist tendencies (proposing, for example, to set up another all-Russia newspaper in addition to Iskra). Lenin classed Yuzhny Rabochy among the organisations "which, while verbally recognising Iskra as the leading organ, actually pursued plans of their own and were unstable in matters of principle". At the 2nd Congress of the Russian Social Democratic Labour Party the Yuzhny Rabochy delegates adopted a 'Centre' position (that of 'middling opportunists', as Lenin called the 'Centre'). Yuzhny Rabochy had two delegates at the Second Party Congress; Levin and Rozanov.

== Dissolution ==
The Second Party Congress voted to dissolve Yuzhny Rabochy, like all other separate, independently existing Social-Democratic groups and organisations.
