= Ulyanovsky (rural locality) =

Ulyanovsky (Russian: Улья́новский; masculine), Ulyanovskaya (Улья́новская; feminine), or Ulyanovskoye (Улья́новское; neuter) is the name of several rural localities in Russia:

- Ulyanovsky, Altai Krai, a settlement in Parfenovsky Selsoviet of Topchikhinsky District of Altai Krai
- Ulyanovsky, Kursk Oblast, a settlement in Popovkinsky Selsoviet of Dmitriyevsky District of Kursk Oblast
- Ulyanovsky, Neklinovsky District, Rostov Oblast, a khutor in Fedorovskoye Rural Settlement of Neklinovsky District of Rostov Oblast
- Ulyanovsky, Zimovnikovsky District, Rostov Oblast, a khutor in Severnoye Rural Settlement of Zimovnikovsky District of Rostov Oblast
- Ulyanovsky, Samara Oblast, a settlement in Shigonsky District of Samara Oblast
- Ulyanovsky, Tambov Oblast, a settlement in Baylovsky Selsoviet of Pichayevsky District of Tambov Oblast
- Ulyanovskoye, Chechen Republic, a selo in Naursky District of the Chechen Republic
- Ulyanovskoye, Chuvash Republic, a settlement in Nizhnekumashkinskoye Rural Settlement of Shumerlinsky District of the Chuvash Republic
- Ulyanovskoye, Kabardino-Balkar Republic, a selo in Prokhladnensky District of the Kabardino-Balkar Republic
- Ulyanovskoye, Kaliningrad Oblast, a settlement in Novostroyevsky Rural Okrug of Ozyorsky District of Kaliningrad Oblast
- Ulyanovskoye, Republic of Kalmykia, a selo in Ulyanovskaya Rural Administration of Yashaltinsky District of the Republic of Kalmykia
- Ulyanovskoye, Poshekhonsky District, Yaroslavl Oblast, a village in Pogorelsky Rural Okrug of Poshekhonsky District of Yaroslavl Oblast
- Ulyanovskoye, Rybinsky District, Yaroslavl Oblast, a village in Mikhaylovsky Rural Okrug of Rybinsky District of Yaroslavl Oblast
- Ulyanovskaya, Arkhangelsk Oblast, a village in Ustyansky District of Arkhangelsk Oblast
- Ulyanovskaya, Vologda Oblast, a village in Avksentyevsky Selsoviet of Ust-Kubinsky District of Vologda Oblast
