= Vasili Osipanov =

- Born: February 21/March 5, 1861; Tomsk, Russian Empire
- Died: May 8/May 20, 1887 (aged 26); Shlisselburg Fortress, Russia
- Cause of death: Execution by hanging

Vasili Stepanovich Osipanov (Осипанов, Василий Степанович in Russian) (2.21(3.5).1861, Tomsk — 5.8(20).1887) was a Russian revolutionary and a member of Narodnaya Volya.

In 1881—1886, Osipanov was a student at the University of Kazan, where he joined the revolutionary movement. He later transferred to St.Petersburg University. In 1886, Osipanov joined the "Terrorist Faction" of Narodnaya Volya and, together with Aleksandr Ulyanov and others, took part in preparing the assassination of Alexander III. He was placed in charge of the bombthrowers.

Osipanov was arrested on March 1, 1887 and later executed in the Shlisselburg Fortress.
