= Ulyanovsky =

Ulyanovsky or Ulyanovskaya may refer to:

== Places ==
- Ulyanovsky District, Kaluga Oblast, an administrative and municipal district in Kaluga Oblast, Russia
- Ulyanovsky District, Ulyanovsk Oblast, an administrative and municipal district in Ulyanovsk Oblast, Russia
- Ulyanovsk Oblast or Ulyanovskaya oblast, a federal subject of Russia

== People ==
- Nadezhda Ulyanovskaya (born 1978), Soviet and Russian football player and referee

== See also ==
- Ulyanovsky (rural locality), a list of rural localities in Russia
- Ulyanovsk
- Ulyanov
- Ulyanka (disambiguation)
