= League of Russian Revolutionary Social Democracy Abroad =

Russian emigre political organisation

League of Russian Revolutionary Social-Democracy Abroad was a Russian emigre political organisation, founded by Lenin in October 1901. The Iskra organisation abroad and the Sotsial-Demokrat revolutionary organisation (which included the Emancipation of Labour group) united to form the League. The League's task was to disseminate the ideas of revolutionary Social-Democracy and promote militant revolutionary Social-Democracy.
