= Ulyanka =

Ulyanka may refer to:

- Ulyanka Municipal Okrug, a municipal okrug of Kirovsky District of the federal city of St. Petersburg, Russia
- Ulyanka (rural locality), a rural locality (a selo) in Ichalkovsky District of the Republic of Mordovia, Russia
