= Olga Ilyinichna Ulyanova =

Sister of Vladimir Lenin (1871–1891)

Olga Ulyanova
- Ольга Ульянова
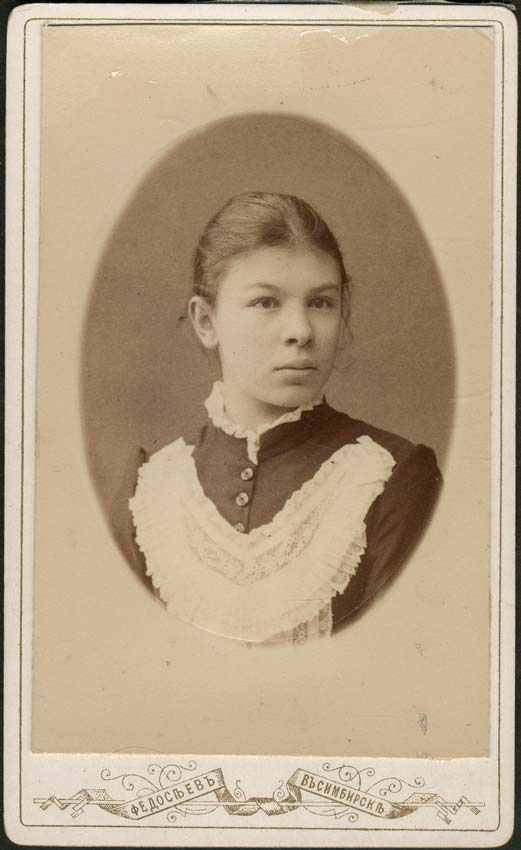
- Ulyanova in 1887
- Born: 16 November [O.S. 4 November] 1871; Simbirsk, Russian Empire
- Died: 20 May [O.S. 8 May] 1891 (aged 19); St. Petersburg, Russian Empire
- Resting place: Volkovo Cemetery
- Known for: sister of Vladimir Lenin
- Parents: Ilya Ulyanov (father); Maria Blank (mother)

Olga Ilyinichna Ulyanova (Russian: Ольга Ильинична Ульянова; 16 November [O.S. 4 November] 1871 – 20 May [O.S. 8 May] 1891) was a Russian noblewoman, polyglot, and the sister of Vladimir Lenin. She was born into a wealthy family of middle-class status but, in 1882, the family were elevated into the hereditary nobility. Ulyanova excelled in academics and planned to become a teacher, but was denied the position due to her brother Aleksandr Ulyanov's criminal offenses as a revolutionary. She was later given a certificate of reliability that allowed her to enroll in the Bestuzhev Courses in St. Petersburg. She studied French, German, English, Swedish, Italian, and Latin at Bestuzhev, as well as mathematics, physics, and drawing. Ulyanova had hoped to practice medicine once completing her studies, but died after contracting typhoid fever just six months after arriving in St. Petersburg.

== Early life and family ==
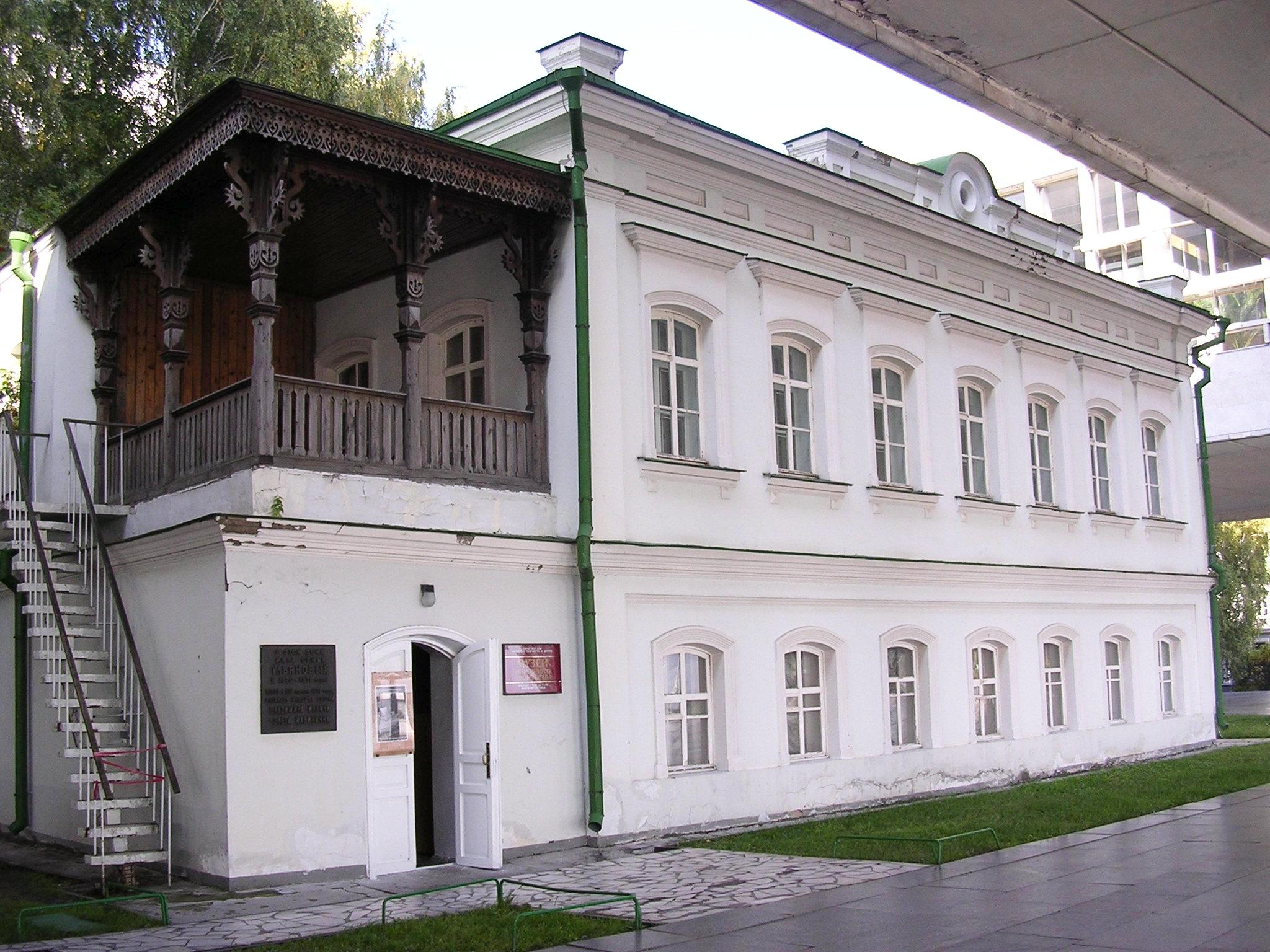
Ulyanova's birthplace

Ulyanova was born in Simbrisk on 4 November 1871 as the fifth child of Ilya Ulyanov and Maria Alexandrovna Blank. Her mother was a member of the wealthy Blank family of Jewish, German, and Swedish descent. Her father was the son of Nikolai Vasilievich Ulyanov, a former serf who received his freedom from the landowner Stepan Mikhailovich Brekhov.

Ulyanova was the sister of Vladimir Ulyanov (Lenin), Maria Ilyinichna Ulyanova, Anna Ulyanova, Aleksandr Ulyanov, and Dmitry Ilyich Ulyanov. She was the closest to Lenin out of all of her siblings.

Ulyanova was baptized in the Russian Orthodox faith on 9 November 1871 at the Tikhvin Monastery of the Dormition of the Mother of God. Her godparents were Vladimir Alexandrovich Aunovsky and Anna Alexandrovna Kurbatova. Her mother taught her how to embroider with satin stitch and cross stitch. In January 1882, her father's dedication to education earned him the Order of Saint Vladimir, which bestowed on him and the Ulyanov family the status of hereditary nobility.

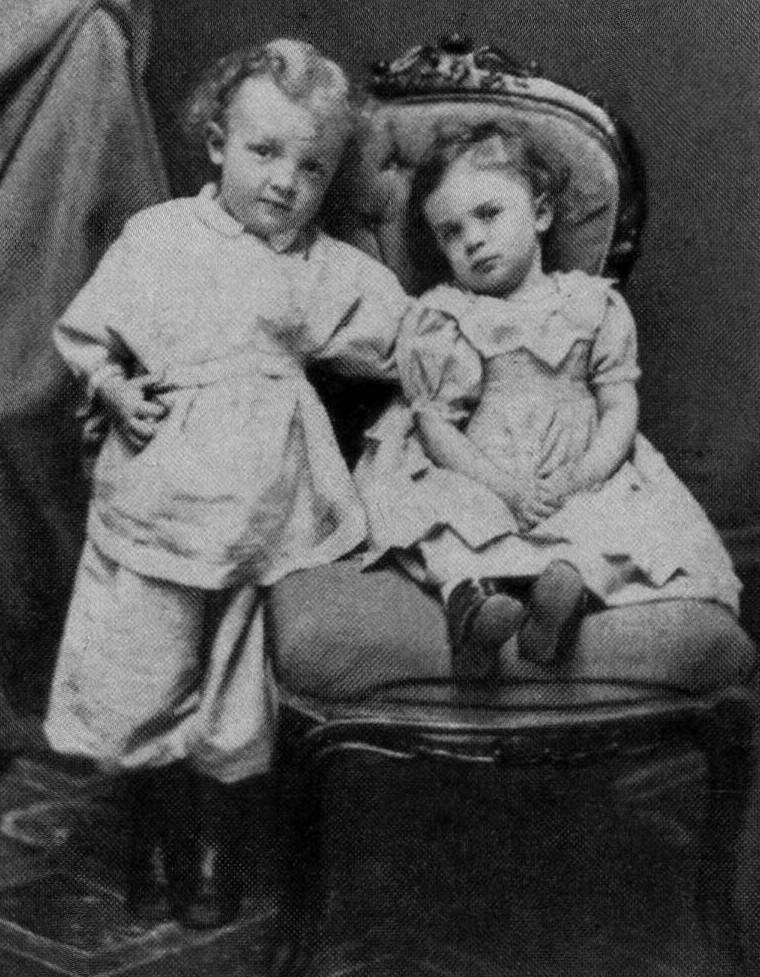
Ulyanova (right) with her brother, Vladimir Lenin, in 1874.

== Education ==
When she was seven years old, she was sent to the First Women's Parish School but, after studying there for one year, she began being tutored at home by her older sister, Anna. From 1883 to 1887, Ulyanova studied at the Mariinsky Women's Gymnasium in Simbirsk. She graduated with honors. Ulyanova applied for a teaching position in Samara but was denied the post due to being related to a state criminal, as her brother, Alexander, had been executed in 1887 for revolutionary tendencies. In April 1890, she received a certificate of reliability and, in the fall of that year, was admitted to the Bestuzhev Courses in St. Petersburg. She studied physics, mathematics, English, German, French, Swedish, Latin, Italian, and drawing while enrolled at Bestuzhev. She had hopes of studying medicine.

== Death ==
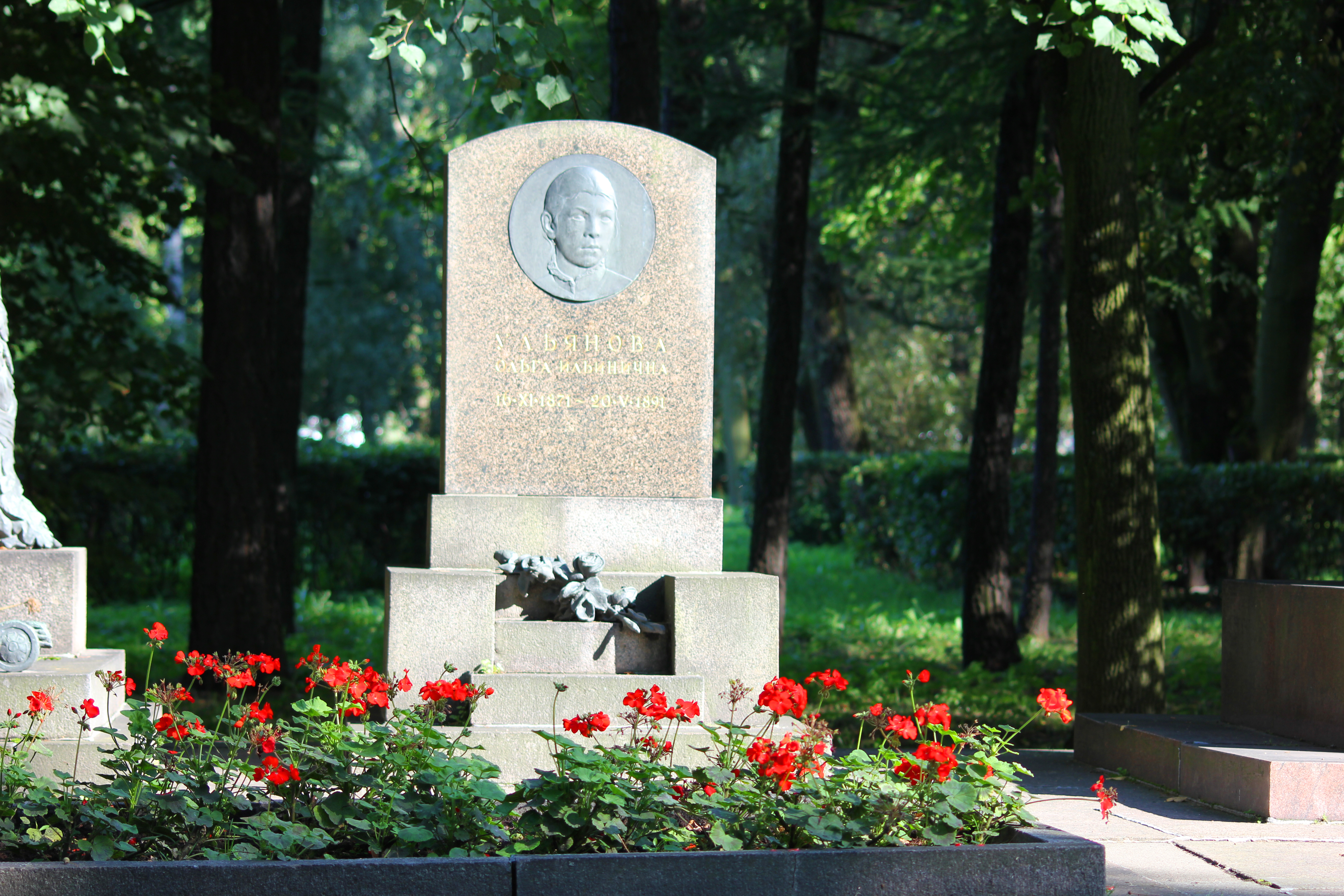
The grave of Olga Ulynova as part of the Ulyanov family memorial, Literatorskiye Mostki quarter of the Volkovo Cemetery

After studying in St. Petersburg for six months, Ulyanova contracted typhoid fever and died at the Alexander Hospital on 8 May 1891, at the age of 19. She was buried in Volkovo Cemetery.
