= Volkovo Cemetery =

Large cemetery in Saint Petersburg, Russia

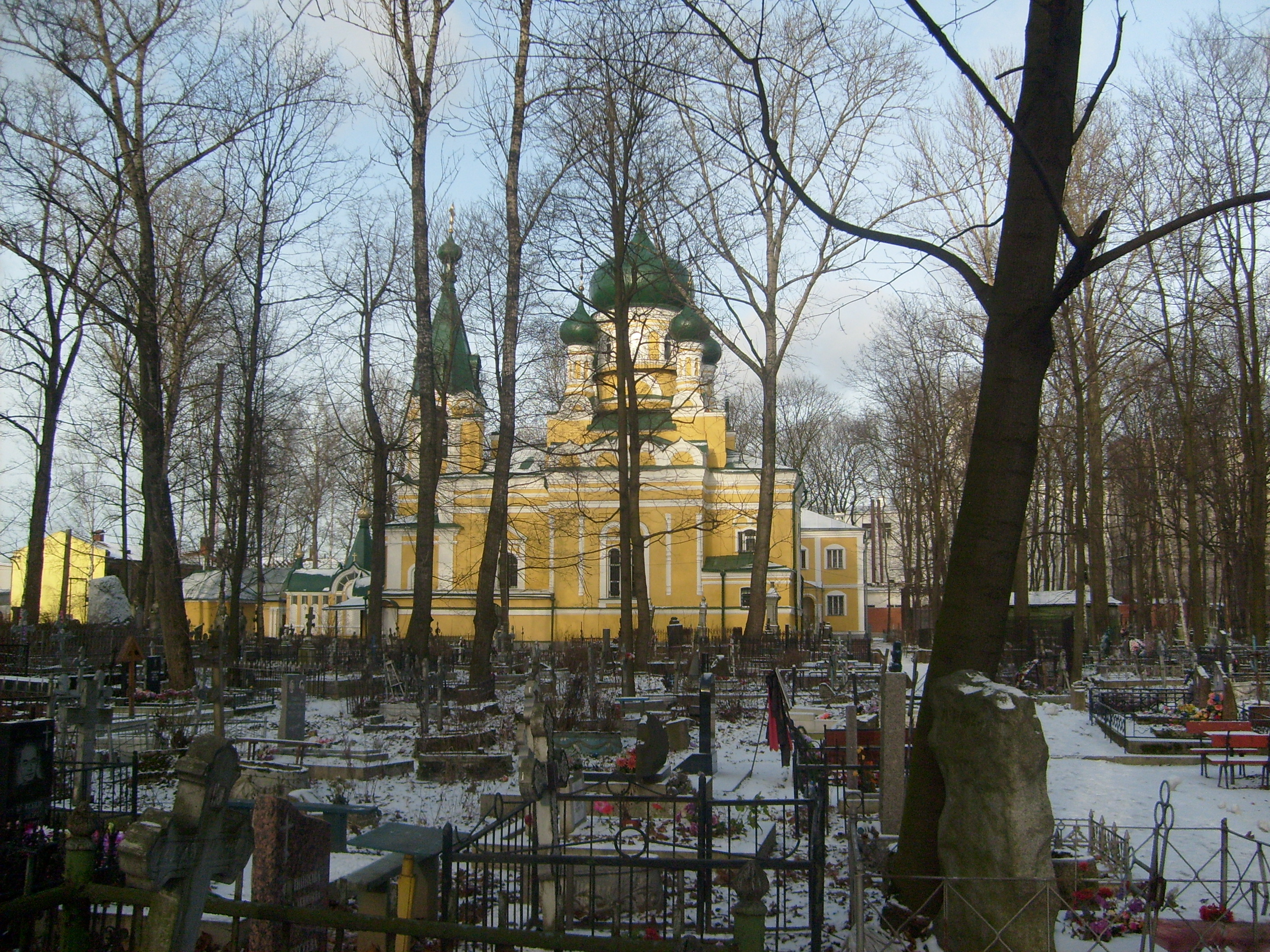
- Church of Saint Job at Volkovskoe cemetery.

Details
- Established: 1773
- Location: Saint Petersburg
- Country: Russia
- Coordinates: 59.902°N 30.365°E
- Type: Public
- Style: Christian (non-Orthodox)
- No. of interments: > 100,000

The Volkovo Cemetery (also Volkovskoe) (Russian: Во́лковское кла́дбище or Во́лково кла́дбище) is one of the largest and oldest non-Orthodox cemeteries in Saint Petersburg, Russia. Until the early 20th century it was one of the main burial grounds for Lutheran Germans in Russia. It is estimated that over 100,000 people have been buried at this cemetery since 1773.

== Origins 1770–1773 ==
Between late 1771 and 1772, Catherine the Great, empress of the Russian Empire, issued an edict which decreed that, from that point on, any person who died (regardless of social standing or class origins) no longer had the right to be buried within church crypts or adjacent churchyards. New cemeteries had to be built across the entire Russian Empire and from then on they all had to be located outside city limits.

One of the main motivations behind these measures was overcrowding in church crypts and graveyards. However, the true deciding factor which led to the new laws being enforced on such a mass scale across the entire Russian empire was to avoid further outbreaks of highly contagious diseases, especially the black plague which had led to the Plague Riot in Moscow in 1771.

The Volkovo cemetery was founded in 1773. The first person to be buried in this cemetery was Johann Gebhard Brethfeld, a merchant in Saint Petersburg.

== Current research ==
The person who has done the most work in investigating the history of the cemetery is Dr. Benedikt Böhm in Saint Petersburg. As of 2007, Dr. Böhm and published four volumes on the history of the cemetery, each of which contain extensive lists of names of those people who were buried there between 1773 and 1936. His 2 main sources for these publications are as follows:

- The original parish registers of burials at the cemetery kept in the states archives in Saint Petersburg.
- Countless personal visits to the cemetery itself since 1989 in which he compiled an inventory of all those graves which are still standing today complete with photographs of each gravestone.

== Dr Böhm's publications ==
- Volume 1 contains 3700 names of those buried in the cemetery between 1773 and 1936 whose graves are still standing today and a further 17,000 names of those interred who were sold a burial plot for eternity, but which no longer have a headstone. The book contains a present-day map detailing the location of all headstones and burial plots.
- Volume 2 contains 40,000 names of those buried between 1863 and 1919, based on the original parish registers of burials.
- Volume 3 contains 40,000 names of those buried between 1820 and 1862, based on the original parish registers of burials.
- Volume 4 is a partial repeat of the information in Volume 3. It contains the names of those buried between 1820 and 1867, indicating which of the 27 non orthodox parishes the deceased person belonged to in Saint Petersburg.

The publications are used by genealogists for family research in pre-revolutionary Russia and the early Soviet period when vital records are missing or prove difficult to find. Historians use them to research the social histories of the city.

== Notable interments ==
- Artur Adamovich Nepokoychitsky (1813-1881), Imperial Russian military leader.
- Maria Alexandrovna Ulyanova (1835-1916), Lenin's mother.
- Olga Ilyinichna Ulyanova (1871–1891), Lenin's sister
- Aleksandr Ivanovich Kuprin (1870-1938), famous Russian writer.

== See also ==
- Smolensk Cemetery
- Vvedenskoye Cemetery
- Germans from Russia
