= Anna Ulyanova =

Russian revolutionary and stateswoman (1864–1935)

- Анна Ульянова
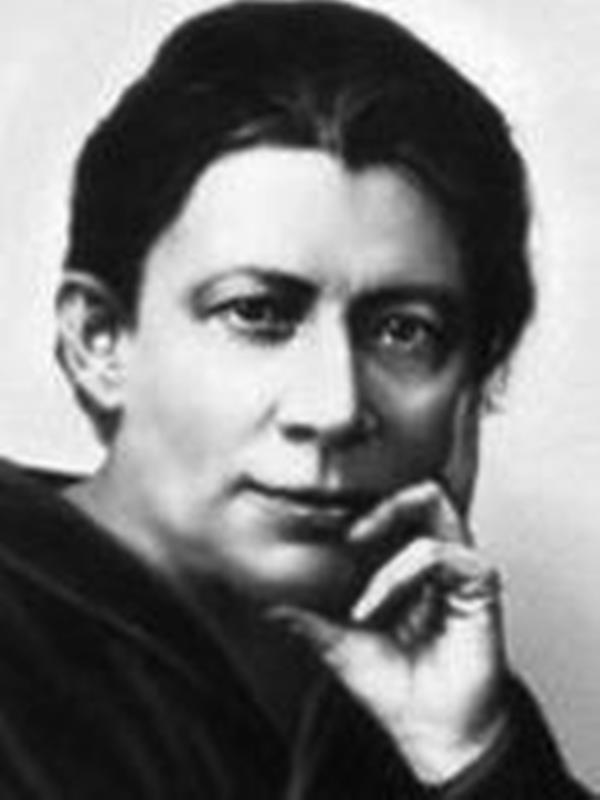
- Ulyanova in 1920
- Born: Anna Ilyinichna Ulyanova; 26 August [O.S. 14 August] 1864; Nizhny Novgorod, Nizhegorodsky Uyezd, Nizhny Novgorod Governorate, Russian Empire
- Died: 19 October 1935 (aged 71); Moscow, Russian SFSR, Soviet Union
- Spouse: Mark Yelizarov (m. 1899; died 1919)
- Parents: Ilya Nikolayevich Ulyanov; Maria Alexandrovna Blank
- Relatives: Vladimir Lenin (brother); Aleksandr Ulyanov (brother); Dmitry Ilyich Ulyanov (brother); Maria Ilyinichna Ulyanova (sister); Olga Ilyinichna Ulyanova (sister)

Anna Ilyinichna Yelizarova-Ulyanova (Russian: Анна Ильинична Елизарова-Ульянова; 26 August [O.S. 14 August] 1864 – 19 October 1935) was a Russian revolutionary and a Soviet politician. The older sister of Vladimir Lenin and of Maria Ilyinichna Ulyanova, she married Mark Yelizarov (1863–1919), who became Soviet Russia's first People's Commissar for Transport (in office, 1917–1918).

== Biography ==
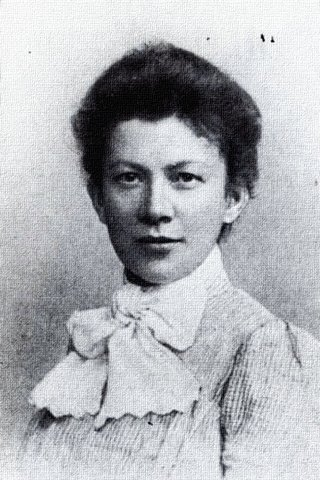
Anna Ulyanova, circa 1895

Anna Ulyanova was the first child of Maria Alexandrovna Blank and Ilya Nikolayevich Ulyanov. In the trial of her brother Alexander Ulyanov (for the planned assassination attempt on Tsar Alexander III in March 1887) she was sentenced to five years in exile. She organized Lenin's contacts from prison with the Petersburg League of Struggle for the Emancipation of the Working Class, supplied him with literature and copied the party documents he had secretly written in prison. In 1898 she joined the Russian Social Democratic Labour Party. She arranged for the publication of Lenin's first work The Development of Capitalism in Russia and other works.

In 1909, she organized the publication of Lenin's book Materialism and Empirio-Criticism. From 1913, she worked on the Pravda editorial board. In 1917, she was actively involved in the preparation and implementation of the October Revolution as editorial secretary of Pravda and editor of the journal Tkach.

After the revolution, she held senior positions in the People's Commissariat for Social Affairs and the People's Commissariat for Education. Ulyanova was one of the founders of the Commission for the Collection and Study of Materials on the History of the October Revolution and the Communist Party (Istpart Commission) and the Institute of Marxism-Leninism, and served as editorial secretary of the journal Proletarskaya Revolyutsiya.

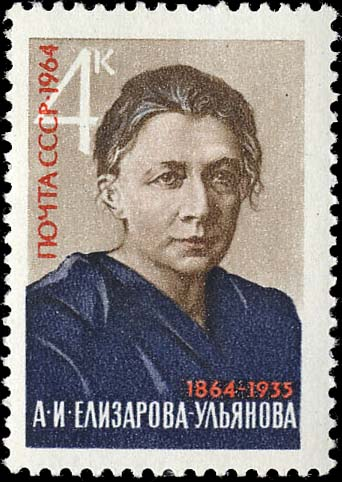
Soviet 1964 stamp commemorative stamp featuring Anna Ulyanova

In 2011 the State Historical Museum in Moscow put on display a 1932 letter from Anna to Joseph Stalin, in which she reveals that Lenin's maternal grandfather was a Jewish native of Zhitomir who converted in order to leave the Pale of Settlement. She asked Stalin to make this publicly known in order to counter increasing anti-Semitism in the Soviet Union at the time, but he refused and told her to keep the matter secret.

Anna Ulyanova died on 19 October 1935 in Moscow. She was buried at the Literatorskie Mostki of the Volkovskoye Cemetery in Leningrad, next to her mother, husband and middle sister Olga.

== See also ==
- Outline of the Russian Revolution and Civil War
- Bibliography of the Russian Revolution and Civil War
- Bibliography of Stalinism and the Soviet Union
- Index of Old Bolsheviks
- Index of articles related to the Russian Revolution and Civil War
