= Aleksandr Ulyanov =

Russian revolutionary and activist (1866–1887)

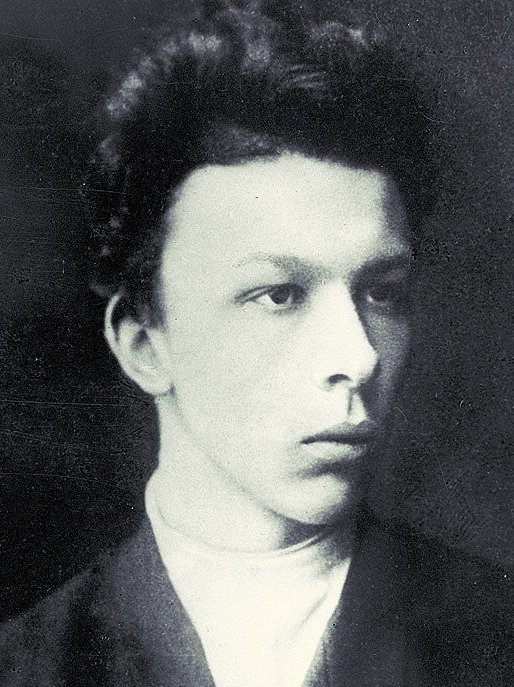
- Ulyanov in 1887
- Born: 12 April [O.S. 31 March] 1866; Nizhny Novgorod, Nizhny Novgorod Governorate, Russian Empire
- Died: 20 May [O.S. 8 May] 1887 (aged 21); Shlisselburg, Russian Empire
- Cause of death: Execution by hanging
- Occupations: Revolutionary socialist, political activist, student
- Political party: Narodnaya Volya
- Parents: Ilya Nikolayevich Ulyanov; Maria Alexandrovna Blank
- Relatives: Vladimir Lenin (brother); Anna Ulyanova (sister); Dmitry Ilyich Ulyanov (brother); Maria Ilyinichna Ulyanova (sister); Olga Ilyinichna Ulyanova (sister)

Aleksandr Ilyich "Sasha" Ulyanov (Russian: Алекса́ндр Ильи́ч Улья́нов; 12 April [O.S. 31 March] 1866 – 20 May [O.S. 8 May] 1887) was a Russian revolutionary and political activist who was executed for planning the assassination of Alexander III of Russia. He was the elder brother of Vladimir Lenin, the founder of the Soviet Union; his execution pushed his younger brother into activism.

== Early life ==
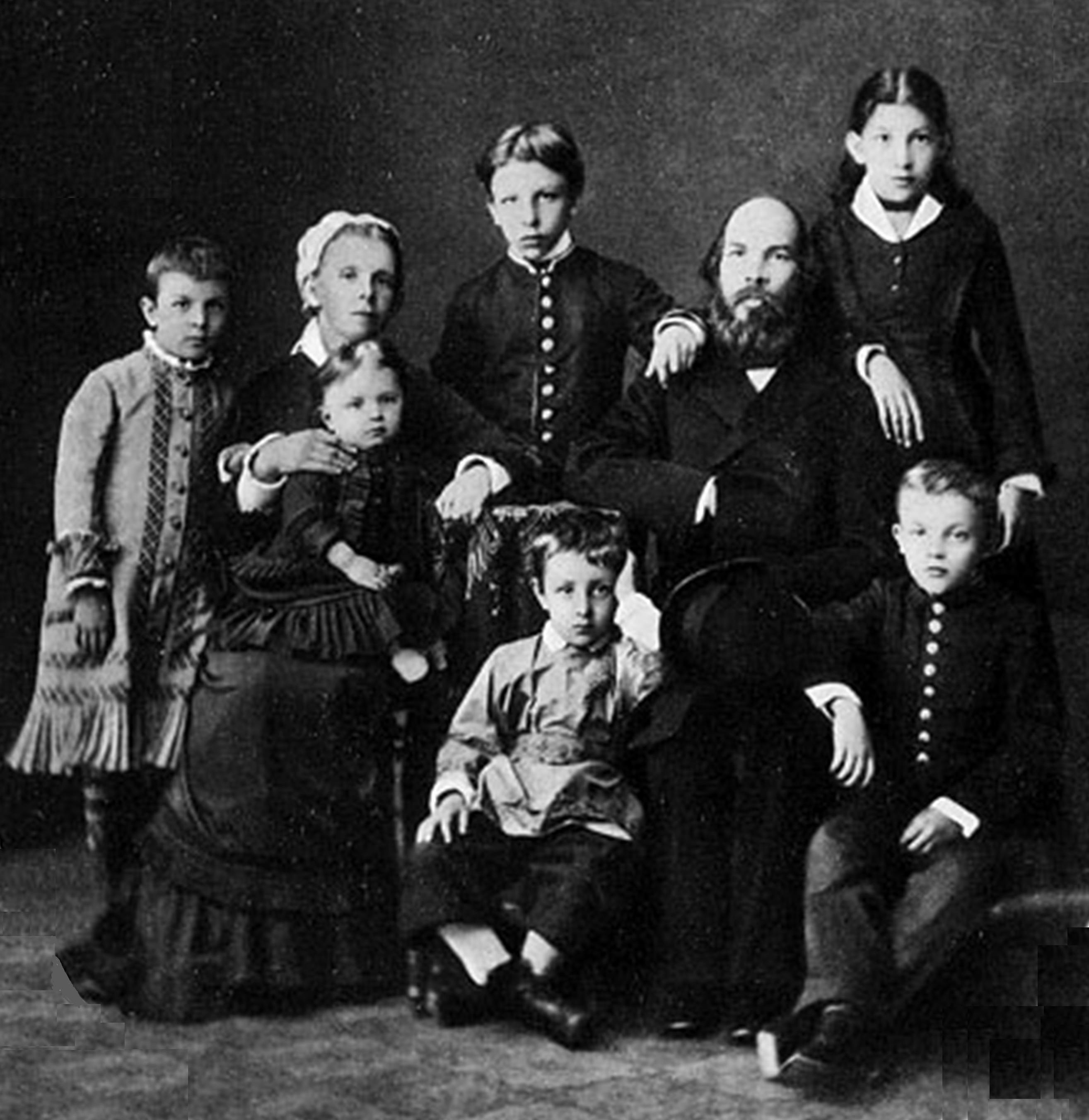
The Ulyanov family, 1879 (Aleksandr standing in the middle, Vladimir sitting to the right).

Ulyanov was born in Nizhny Novgorod, the second child and eldest son of schoolteachers Ilya Nikolayevich Ulyanov and Maria Alexandrovna Ulyanova. He was often referred to as Sasha, a common diminutive form of the name Aleksandr. Through his father, Ulyanov was a member of the Russian nobility. Aleksandr and his brother Vladimir lived together, cohabitating their own separate wing of the Ulyanov home for some time; whenever their numerous cousins visited, the Ulyanov brothers greeted by saying, "Honour us with your absence." Ulyanov's mother, Maria, was obsessed with her children achieving academic excellence, encouraging Aleksandr to pursue such a career.

One of Ulyanov's main interests was natural science, spending his final summer vacation at home with his microscope, preparing a dissertation on Annelida phylum of segmented worms. He graduated with honors from the Classical Gymnasium of Simbirsk in 1883 and later attended Saint Petersburg Imperial University, where he majored in Natural Sciences and earned a degree in zoology. While at university, he participated in illegal meetings and demonstrations, often handing out pamphlets and making speeches to students and workers.

In January 1886, Ulyanov's father Ilya died; his mother did not send word of his father's death right away, as she was worried the news would distract Aleksandr from a chemistry exam. Trotsky interpreted that Vladimir and Aleksandr had developed a sibling rivalry during this period of their lives, with Vladimir exhibiting an "organic need to dominate."

== Revolutionary Activity ==
In 1886 Ulyanov became a member of the "terrorist faction", which was part of the Narodnaya Volya ('People's Will') party. He was one of the authors of the party's program. Acknowledging the working class as the "nucleus of the Socialist Party", the program affirmed the revolutionary's initiative of fighting autocracy through terrorism.

=== Attempted assassination of Alexander III ===
Ulyanov and his comrades conspired to assassinate Alexander III of Russia. On 1 March 1887 (Julian calendar), the day of the sixth anniversary of Alexander II's murder, three party members were arrested in the Nevsky Prospekt carrying handmade bombs filled with dynamite and lead pellets poisoned with strychnine. Police suspected that when Alexander III visited church on the anniversary of his father's assassination, the plotters would throw bombs into the Emperor's carriage. The attempt is known as "The Second First of March".

Ulyanov, who served as both the main ideologist of the group as well as the bomb-maker, was later arrested. In court, Ulyanov gave a political speech. The conspirators were initially sentenced to death; all but five were then pardoned by Alexander III. Ulyanov was not among those pardoned. On 8 May, he and his four comrades – Pakhomy Andreyushkin, Vasily Generalov, Vasili Osipanov, and Petr Shevyrev – were hanged at Shlisselburg.

== Influence on Lenin ==
Aleksandr's execution drove his younger brother Vladimir Ilyich Ulyanov (later known as Vladimir Lenin) into fervent political activity. Before Aleksandr's arrest, Lenin and the family had not known of Aleksander's activism and were comfortably middle class and essentially apolitical, holding no strong feelings for or against the Russian monarchy. Historian James D. White reported that Lenin's introduction to radical politics came only after Aleksandr's death in an attempt to understand the events: "The actions of Lenin and Olga in the period following Sasha’s [Aleksandr's nickname] execution suggest that they had resolved that their brother’s death would not be in vain and that they would serve the cause for which he had sacrificed himself – just as soon as they could discover what that cause had been."

Later in life, Lenin recalled thinking, "No, my brother won't make a revolutionary, I thought at the time. A revolutionary can't give so much time to the study of worms." Lenin also remembered how his family were shunned by liberal circles in Simbirsk following his brother's arrest. Vladimir acknowledged that his brother's death set himself on the revolutionary path, determined to succeed where Aleksandr failed, stating that, "the trail has been blazed for me by my older brother."

== Legacy ==
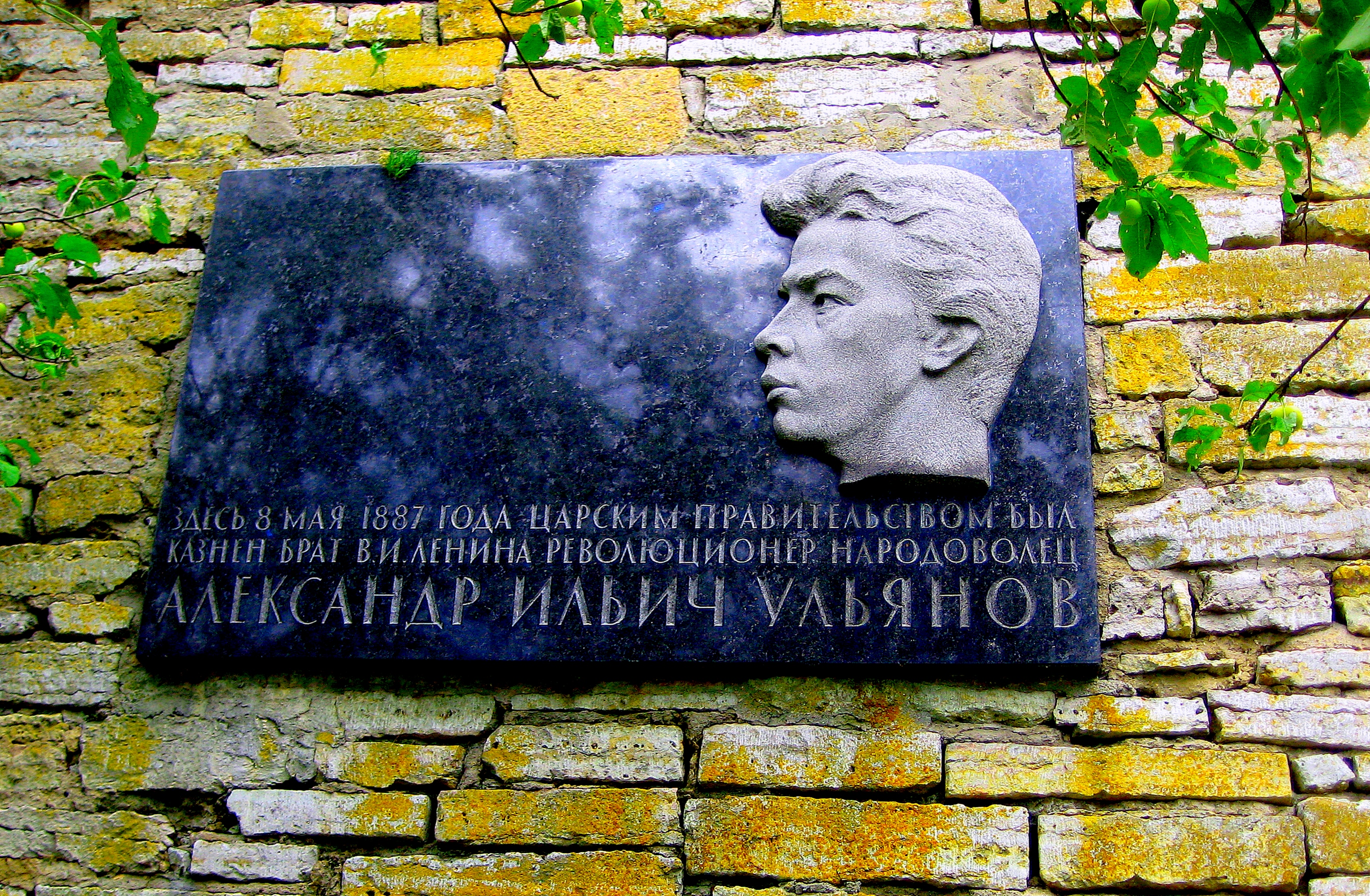
Memorial plaque to Aleksandr Ulyanov in the citadel: Oreshek fortress. Shlisselburg, Kirovsky district, Leningrad region

The life and execution of Aleksandr Ulyanov inspired a variety of media, including plays. During the 1950s-1960s, Soviet filmmakers created films about Aleksandr Ulyanov and his family:

- The Ulyanov Family (Семья Ульяновых; 1957), directed by V. Nevzorov
- Executed at Dawn (Казнены на рассвете...; 1964), directed by Yevgeny Andrikanis
- A Mother's Heart (Сердце матери; 1965), directed by Mark Donskoy.

A minor planet, 2112 Ulyanov, was discovered in 1972 by Soviet astronomer Tamara Mikhailovna Smirnova and named after him.

In 2010, Philip Pomper published the book Lenin's Brother: The Origins of the October Revolution, wherein he argued that it is impossible to understand Vladimir Lenin's evolution as a revolutionary and Bolshevik leader without comprehending the relationship between Lenin and Aleksandr.
