= Ilya Ulyanov =

Russian teacher, father of Vladimir Lenin (1831–1886)

- Илья Ульянов
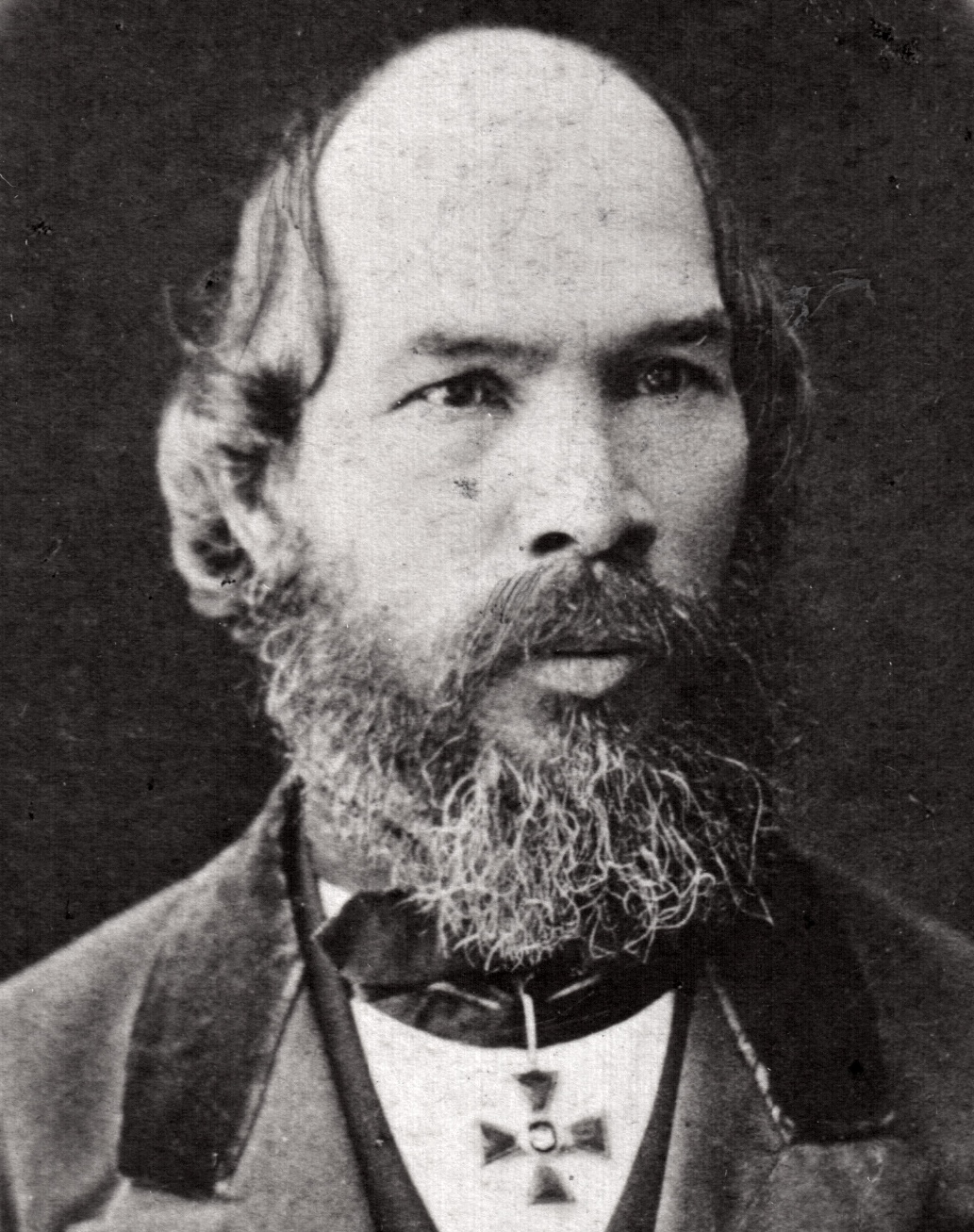
- Ilya Ulyanov, sometime after 1882
- Born: Ilya Nikolayevich Ulyanov; 31 July 1831; Astrakhan, Russian Empire
- Died: 24 January 1886 (aged 54); Simbirsk, Russian Empire
- Occupations: Teacher, public education administrator
- Known for: Father of Vladimir Lenin
- Spouse: Maria Blank (m. 1863)
- Children: 8, including Anna, Aleksandr, Vladimir, Olga, Dmitri and Maria
- Parents: Nikolai Vasilyevich Ulyanov (father); Anna Alexeyevna Ulyanova (mother)

Ilya Nikolayevich Ulyanov OSV (Russian: Илья Николаевич Ульянов; 31 July [O.S. 19 July] 1831 – 24 January [O.S. 12 January] 1886) was a Russian public figure in the field of public education. He was the father of revolutionary Vladimir Lenin, who became a Bolshevik leader and founder of the Soviet Union, and Aleksandr Ulyanov, who was executed for his attempt to assassinate Tsar Alexander III in 1887.

== Life ==
Ilya Nikolayevich Ulyanov was born in Astrakhan. His father was Nikolai Vasilyevich Ulyanov (or Ulyanin; 1765–1838), a tailor and a former serf of possible Chuvash, Mordvinian, Russian, or Kalmyk descent, who came from Sergachsky District, Nizhny Novgorod Governorate – an area with a prominent Russified Mordvin population. Nikolai Vasilyevich Ulyanin received his freedom from a landowner, Stepan Mikhailovich Brekhov, in 1791.

Ilya's mother, Anna Alexeyevna Smirnova (1793–1871), was half-Kalmyk, half-Russian and the daughter of city-dweller Alexei Lukyanovich Smirnov, a son of Lukyan Smirnov. Nikolai married 30-year-old Anna in 1823, however, a recent study believes the Smirnov family to be of Ukrainian, or 'Little Russian' origin. Ilya had three sisters and a brother.

Ilya Nikolayevich Ulyanov graduated from Kazan University's Department of Physics and Mathematics in 1854. In the 1850s and 1860s, he taught mathematics and physics at Penza Institute for the Dvoryane, and later at a gymnasium and at a school for women in Nizhny Novgorod. Around that time, he married Maria Alexandrovna Blank. While at Penza, Ulyanov conducted meteorological observations, on the basis of which he would write several scientific works.

In 1869, Ulyanov was appointed inspector of public schools in the Simbirsk guberniya (in 1874–1886 he was their director). In 1882, Ulyanov was promoted to the rank of Active State Councillor (which gave him the privilege of hereditary nobility) and awarded the Order of Saint Vladimir, 3rd Class.

Ulyanov was a well-educated man with excellent organizational and teaching skills. Some Soviet historians believed that his pedagogical views formed under the influence of the revolutionary ideas of Nikolai Chernyshevsky (1828-1889) and of Nikolai Dobrolyubov (1836-1861). Ulyanov contributed immensely to the elaboration of the theory and practice of elementary education. He advocated equal rights for education regardless of gender, nationality and social status. Other commentators, such as Tony Cliff, dispute this image, regarding it as a posthumous Stalinist attempt to improve the reputation of Lenin's family. Cliff wrote in his biography of Lenin: 'Nikolaevich's standing in the Ministry of Education, and his steady rise up the hierarchical ladder, somehow do not fit the image of a revolutionary, or even a radical.' In 1871, Ulyanov opened the first Chuvash school in Simbirsk, (Note: Compare: Dowler, Wayne (2001). Classroom and Empire: The Politics of Schooling Russia's Eastern Nationalities, 1860-1917. Montreal: McGill-Queen's University Press. p. 103. ISBN 9780773520998. "In 1868, I.Ia. Iakovlev, who became inspector of Chuvash schools in 1871, established the Simbirsk Chuvash School as a private institution.") which would later be transformed into Chuvash teacher's seminar. He also established national schools for Mordvins and Tatars. Furthermore, Ulyanov organized and presided over many teachers' congresses and other similar events.

In 1886, Ulyanov died of a brain haemorrhage while in Simbirsk (subsequently, in 1924, renamed Ulyanovsk in honor of his son).

== Family ==
- Maria Alexandrovna Ulyanova (1835–1916), married in 1863, and had eight children:
  - Anna (1864–1935)
  - Aleksandr (1866–1887)
  - Olga (1868–1869)
  - Vladimir (1870–1924)
  - Olga (1871–1891)
  - Nikolai (1873–1873)
  - Dmitri (1874–1943)
  - Maria (1878–1937)
