= Dmitry Ilyich Ulyanov =

Younger brother of Vladimir Lenin

Dmitri Ulyanov

Chairman of the Council of People's Commissars of the Crimean Socialist Soviet Republic
- In office 5 May 1919 – 23 June 1919
- Preceded by: Position established Anton Slutsky (as chairman of previous soviet government)
- Succeeded by: Position abolished Béla Kun (as chair of successor soviet government)

Personal details
- Born: 16 August [O.S. 4 August] 1874 Simbirsk, Russian Empire
- Died: 16 July 1943 (aged 68) Gorki Leninskiye, Moscow Oblast, Soviet Union
- Party: Bolsheviks
- Spouse: Antonia Ivanovna Neshcheretova
- Children: 2 (including Olga Ulyanova)
- Parent(s): Ilya Ulyanov; Maria Alexandrovna Ulyanova
- Relatives: Vladimir Lenin (brother); Aleksandr Ulyanov (brother); Olga Ilyinichna Ulyanova (sister); Maria Ilyinichna Ulyanova (sister); Anna Ulyanova (sister)

Dmitri Ilyich Ulyanov (Russian: Дми́трий Ильи́ч Улья́нов; 16 August [O.S. 4 August] 1874 – 16 July 1943) was a Russian and Soviet physician and revolutionary, the younger brother of Aleksandr Ulyanov and Vladimir Lenin. A dedicated Marxist, Ulyanov worked as a correspondent of his brother's newspaper Iskra and applied his training as a doctor to the 1905 Revolution and World War I. Following the October Revolution and during the Russian Civil War, Ulyanov remained in Ukraine to strengthen the party in Crimea, serving as chairman of the Crimean Socialist Soviet Republic. He spent the remainder of his life working for the USSR and collaborating with his sister Maria Ilyinichna Ulyanova in writing reminiscences about their brother, Vladimir Lenin.

== Life ==
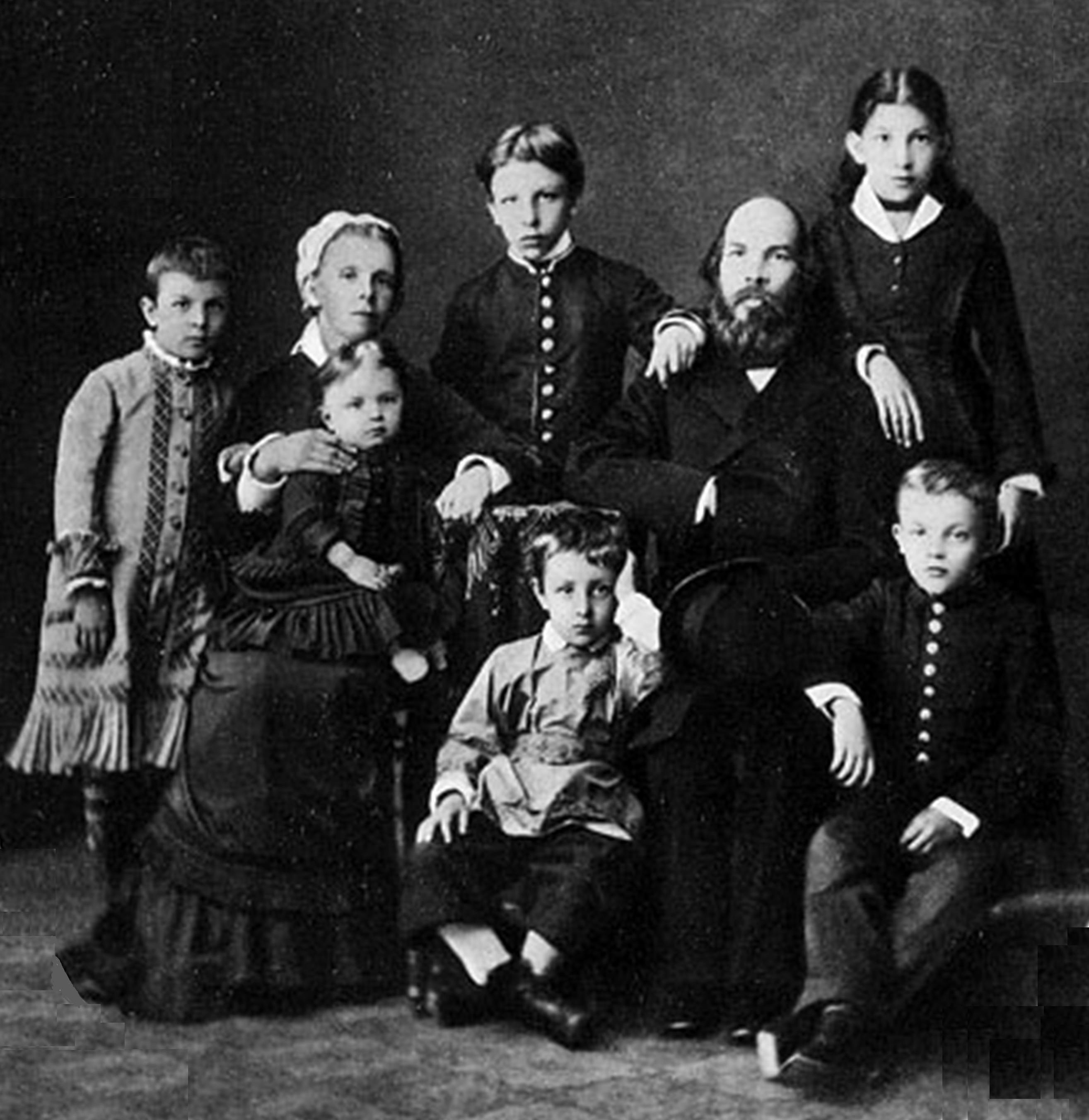
The Ulyanov family, 1879 (Dmitry sitting in the middle, Vladimir to the right).

As a medical student at Lomonosov Moscow State University, he became involved with revolutionary activity and joined the illegal Marxist Rabochiy soyuz ("Workers' Union"). He was first arrested in 1897. The following year he was exiled to Tula, then Podolsk, where he was put under police supervision (equivalent to modern probation). As his brother's renown grew, he endured countless arrests. In 1900 he became a correspondent of Iskra. The following year he graduated from the medical school of the University of Tartu.

As a doctor and a Marxist, Ulyanov sought to apply his medical training to the revolutionary struggle. During the Revolution of 1905 he provided medical aid to strikers in Simbirsk. He became a trusted cadre of the Russian Social Democratic Workers' Party and was a delegate to its 2nd Congress. He served as the representative of the Central Committee in Kiev. His duties carried him throughout Russia and Ukraine, first to Serpukhov, then to Feodosiya and Crimea.

At the beginning of the First World War, Ulyanov was mobilized into the army. He served as a medical officer in Sevastopol, in Odessa, and on the Romanian front, continuing his revolutionary activities on the side. In 1916 he married Antonia Ivanovna Neshcheretova. They had a son, Viktor, and a daughter, Olga.

Ulyanov remained in Ukraine during the aftermath of the October Revolution and the Civil War, working to strengthen the party apparatus in Crimea and was chairman of the short-lived Crimean Socialist Soviet Republic. In 1921 he moved to Moscow, where he worked at Narkomzdrav (People's Commissariat of Public Health), at the Communist University of the Toilers of the East, in the health research department of the Kremlin, and at the V. I. Lenin Central Museum.

During the 1930s, he collaborated with his sister Maria (who was named after their mother) to write reminiscences about their famous brother, Vladimir Lenin, which were published in serial form. He was a delegate to the 16th and 17th Congresses of the Communist Party of the Soviet Union. He died in Gorki Leninskiye and was buried in Moscow. Many streets and localities in the Soviet Union were renamed in his honor.

== See also ==
- Outline of the Russian Revolution and Civil War
- Bibliography of the Russian Revolution and Civil War
- Bibliography of Stalinism and the Soviet Union
- Index of Old Bolsheviks
- Index of articles related to the Russian Revolution and Civil War
