= Maria Ilyinichna Ulyanova =

Russian-Soviet revolutionary, politician and stateswoman

Maria Ulyanova
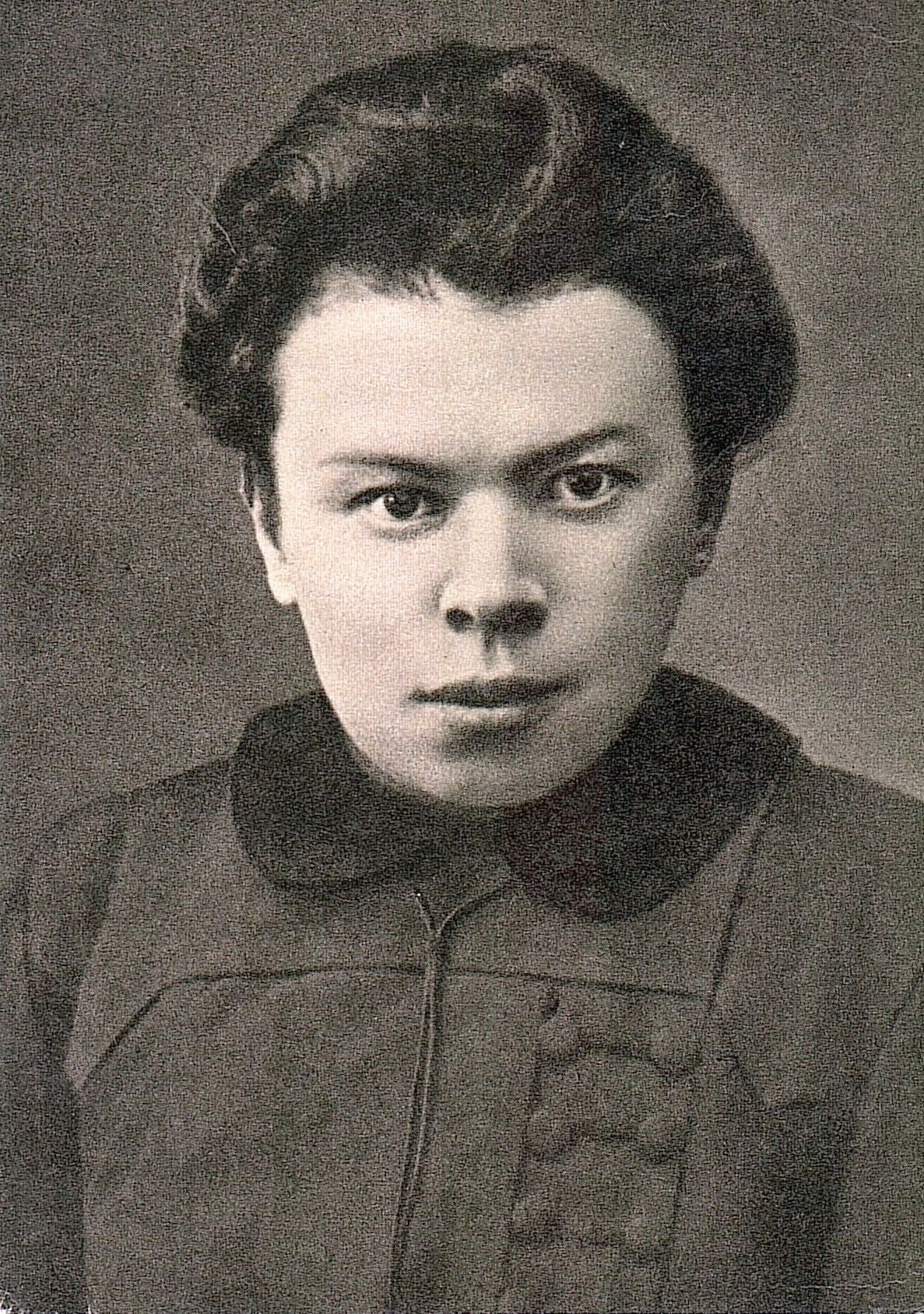
- Born: Maria Ilyinichna Ulyanova; 6 February [O.S. 18 February] 1878; Simbirsk, Russian Empire
- Died: 12 June 1937 (aged 59); Moscow, Russian SFSR, Soviet Union
- Resting place: Kremlin Wall Necropolis, Moscow
- Education: University of Paris
- Political party: RSDLP; CPSU
- Parents: Ilya Nikolayevich Ulyanov; Maria Alexandrovna Blank
- Relatives: Vladimir Lenin (brother); Aleksandr Ulyanov (brother); Dmitry Ilyich Ulyanov (brother); Anna Ulyanova (sister); Olga Ilyinichna Ulyanova (sister)
- Awards: Order of Lenin

Maria Ilyinichna Ulyanova (Russian: Мари́я Ильи́нична Улья́нова; 18 February [O.S. 6 February] 1878 – 12 June 1937) was a Russian Bolshevik revolutionary, politician, and the younger sister of Vladimir Lenin and Anna Ulyanova.

== Early life ==
Maria Ilyinichna Ulyanova was born on 6 February 1878 in Simbirsk and was the youngest child of Ilya Nikolaevich Ulyanov and his wife Maria Alexandrovna. She was given the nickname "Manyasha" by her family. She studied first at the Simbirsk gymnasium, in Simbirsk, graduating in 1893. In 1895, Maria applied to the physicochemical department of the mathematical faculty of the Higher (Bestuzhev) women's courses in Saint Petersburg. However she was not accepted, and she had to enroll in 1896 for a two-year course in Moscow. After her graduation, she received a teaching diploma.

== Revolutionary and Soviet life ==
Since 1898, Maria had been a member of the Russian Social-Democratic Labour Party (RSDLP). She conducted propaganda in workers' circles, delivered illegal literature, and acted as a liaison officer. She was arrested several times. In September 1899, after the arrests of members of the Moscow RSDLP, Maria was sent under police supervision to Nizhny Novgorod. On the night of March 1, 1901, Maria was arrested and placed in solitary confinement in the Taganskaya prison. After seven months she was deported to Samara. The third time she was arrested was in January 1904, and then having been released on bail in June of the same year, Maria left for Switzerland.

In 1905, Maria returned to Saint Petersburg, where she worked as secretary of the Vasileostrovsky District Committee of the RSDLP. On May 2, 1907, Maria was arrested again. Having been released in 1908, she moved to Moscow and worked in the Moscow Party organization. In 1908-1909 Maria lived in Paris and studied at the Sorbonne, where she received a teaching diploma in French. In the summer of 1910, hiding from arrest, Maria worked as a home teacher in the village of Leppenino near the station Terijoki (Grand Duchy of Finland).

Maria was arrested again in May 1912, and was later deported to Vologda. From February to April 1915 in Moscow she studied at the Sisters of Mercy. In the summer of 1915 Maria went to the Western Front (Russian Empire) with a medical-nutrition detachment. Since 1915, Maria was part of the Moscow organization of the RSDLP, corresponding with the Foreign Bureau of the Central Committee. After the February Revolution of 1917, she was co-opted into the Bureau of the Central Committee of the RSDLP.

Maria took an active part in the development of the Social Democratic and then the Communist press in Russia. From 1900 until 1917 she worked for Iskra, in 1917-1929 she was a member of the editorial board of Pravda. Since 1903, she was in the Secretariat of the Central Committee of the RSDLP. She was a member of the Bureau of the Central Committee of the RSDLP from 1917.

=== Later life ===
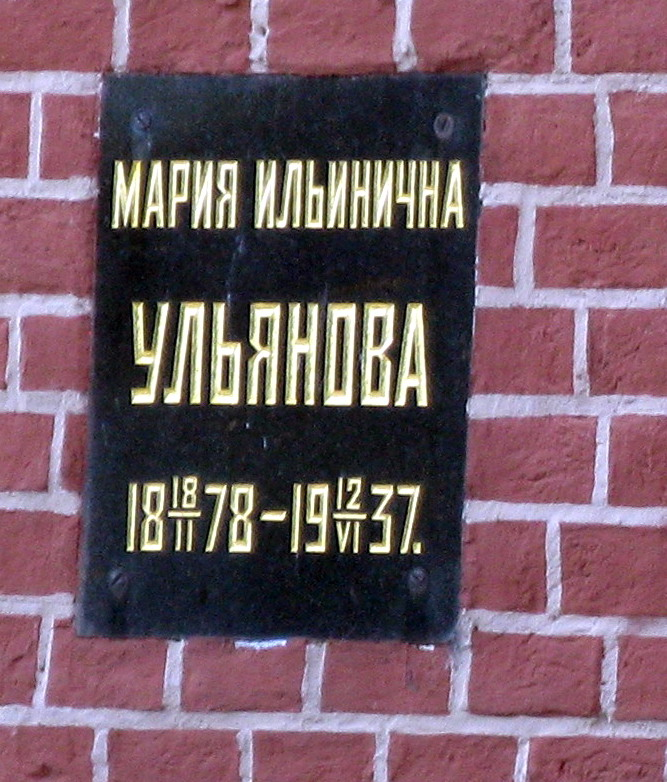
Ulyanova's grave at the Kremlin Wall Necropolis

Maria was a member of the Central Control Commission of the VKP (b) from 1925 to 1934, a member of the Presidium of the CCC of the CPSU (1932–1934), then a member of the Soviet Control Commission under the SNK of the USSR from 1935. In 1935, she was appointed to the Central Executive Committee of the Soviet Union.

Maria Ilinichna Ulyanova died on 12 June 1937, of, as it was reported, heart disease in Moscow. The urn with her ashes in is buried in the Kremlin wall.

== See also ==
- Outline of the Russian Revolution and Civil War
- Bibliography of the Russian Revolution and Civil War
- Bibliography of Stalinism and the Soviet Union
- Index of Old Bolsheviks
- Index of articles related to the Russian Revolution and Civil War
