= Maria Alexandrovna Ulyanova =

Mother of Vladimir Lenin (1835–1916)

Maria Ulyanova
- Мария Ульянова
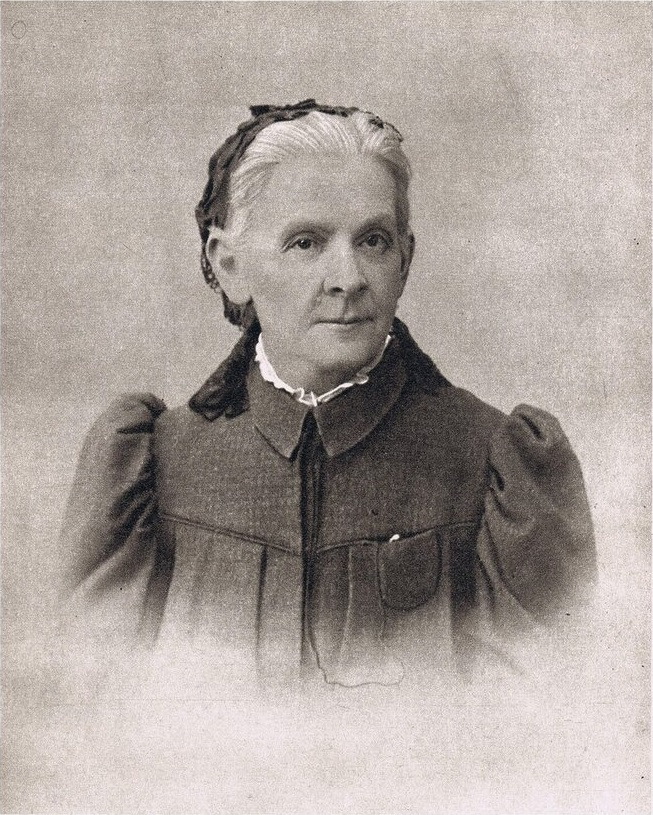
- Maria Ulyanova
- Born: Maria Alexandrovna Blank; 6 March 1835; Saint Petersburg, Russian Empire
- Died: 25 July 1916 (aged 81)
- Known for: Mother of Vladimir Lenin
- Spouse: Ilya Ulyanov (m. 1863; died 1886)
- Children: 8, including Anna, Aleksandr, Vladimir, Olga, Dmitri and Maria
- Father: Alexandr Dmitrievich Blank

Maria Alexandrovna Ulyanova (Russian: Мария Александровна Ульянова; née Blank; 6 March [O.S. 22 February] 1835 – 25 July [O.S. 12 July] 1916) was the mother of the Bolshevik leader Vladimir Lenin, who in 1922 founded the Soviet Union. Well-educated and married to a mathematics-physics teacher, she focused on raising her children.

== Life ==
She was born in Saint Petersburg as Maria Alexandrovna Blank, one of six children. Her father, Alexandr Dmitrievich Blank, was a well-to-do physician. There is evidence that he was a Jewish convert to Christianity and that he was born as Srul Moshevich Blank (also spelled Israil Moiseevich Blank). However, some historians argue this was another man by a similar name.

Her mother, Anna Ivanovna Groschopf, was the daughter of a German father, Johan Groschopf, and a Swedish mother, Anna Östedt. In 1838, Ulyanova's mother died and her father turned to his sister-in-law, Ekaterina von Essen, to help raise the children. Together they bought a country estate near Kazan and moved the family there. Ulyanova was educated at home, studying German, French, and English as well as Russian and Western literature. In 1863, she took an external degree and became an elementary school teacher. However, she would go on to dedicate most of her life to raising her children.

After marrying Ilya Nikolayevich Ulyanov, a teacher of mathematics and physics, the couple lived in moderate prosperity in Penza. Later, they moved to Nizhny Novgorod and then Simbirsk, where Ulyanov was appointed inspector of primary schools.

Ulyanova had to face tragedies in her family: the deaths of her infant children, Olga and Nikolai, in 1869 and 1873, respectively; the death of her husband in 1886; the execution of her son, Aleksandr, in 1887; the death of her daughter, Olga, in 1891; and the multiple arrests and exiles of the rest of her children – Vladimir, Anna, Dmitry and Maria.

She went abroad twice to meet with Vladimir Lenin (to France in the summer of 1902 and Stockholm in the fall of 1910).

== Family ==
She was married to Ilya Ulyanov from 1863 until his death in 1886. They had eight children, two of whom died as infants.

- Anna (1864–1935)
- Aleksandr (1866–1887)
- Olga (1868–1869)
- Vladimir (1870–1924)
- Olga (1871–1891)
- Nikolai (1873–1873)
- Dmitri (1874–1943)
- Maria (1878–1937)
