= Józef Łukaszewicz =

Polish physicist, geologist and mineralogist

Professor Józef Łukaszewicz
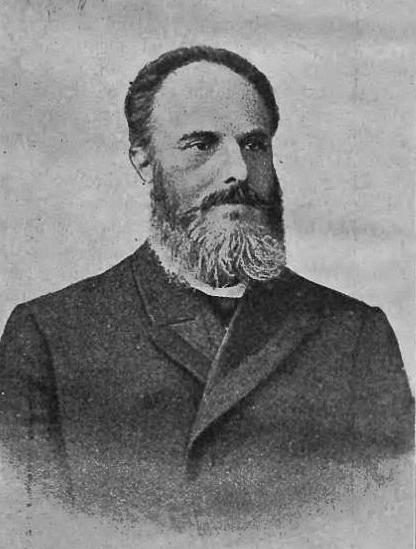
- Born: 1 (13) December 1863; Vilnius, Russian Empire
- Died: 19 October 1928 (aged 64); Vilnius, Second Polish Republic
- Resting place: Rasos Cemetery
- Citizenship: Russian Empire; Second Polish Republic
- Education: Saint Petersburg Mining University
- Scientific career
- Fields: Physicist, geologist, mineralogist
- Workplaces: Vilnius University
- Academic advisors: Karol Bohdanowicz

Józef Łukaszewicz (13 December 1863 – 19 October 1928) was a Polish physicist, geologist and mineralogist, as well as a 19th-century revolutionary. During his life he took part in a failed attempt to assassinate tsar Alexander III of Russia, served a lifetime sentence in Shlisselburg prison, was a professor at numerous universities, headed the Petersburg Institute of Geography and a chair in the Stefan Batory University of Wilno.

== Life ==
Józef Łukaszewicz was born on 13 December 1863 in his family's manor of Bikiškė (Polish: Bykówka) near Vilnius (currently in the Elderate of Medininkai, at the border with Belarus). After graduating from the local gymnasium he joined the Mathematic Division of the University of St. Petersburg. There he became friends with Aleksandr Ulyanov and Petr Shevyrev, two young revolutionaries that were preparing an assassination attempt on the life of Alexander III of Russia. Łukaszewicz became one of the members of the Terrorist Faction of Narodnaya Volya and invited to the circle one of his friends, Bronisław Piłsudski, also a student at the local university. Ulyanov's brother, later to be known as Lenin, became the first leader of the Soviet Union, while Bronisław's brother Józef Piłsudski would later become the leader of Poland.

=== Assassination plans ===
As a skilled chemist, Łukaszewicz was chosen as the person to build three bombs that were to kill the tsar. To make it easier to hide the bomb, he concealed it in a copy of Grunberg's Medical Dictionary. The inside was filled with shrapnel and dynamite, while the fuse was made of a tube filled with mercury fulminate. Two additional bombs were prepared in case the main did not detonate as planned. To make the explosion more lethal, Łukaszewicz decided to fill all three bombs with capsules filled with strychnine.

However, before the attempt was ready, on 1 March 1887 all the revolutionaries were arrested by the police. After a short trial on 8 May, Ulyanov and his comrades Pakhomiy Andreyushkin, Vasili Generalov, Vasili Osipanov and Petr Shevyrev were sentenced to death and hanged at Shlisselburg. Most of the Polish accomplices (including Lukaszewicz, but also the future marshal of Poland Józef Piłsudski and Tytus Paszkowski) were also sentenced to death, but their sentence was later exchanged to that of katorga, or forced resettlement to a prison camp. According to trial records, Łukasiewicz appealed for the tsar's mercy.

=== Life in prison ===
Łukaszewicz was sent to the Peter and Paul Fortress and then, on 17 May 1887, to the Shlisselburg Fortress. There he started working on his first geological maps and studies on mineralogy. According to his long-time friend Vera Figner, for his first sketches Łukaszewicz used the soot of his lamp and a blue paint from the walls of his cell. With time he became a member of an informal circle of natural scientists serving their sentences in the fortress and exchanging knowledge. Finally in early 20th century Łukaszewicz was allowed to receive books and newspapers from the outside, which allowed him to continue his studies.

=== Life after the Revolution of 1905 ===
The Revolution of 1905 and the thaw that ensued resulted in Łukaszewicz's release from the prison and return home. In 1906 he was allowed to return to St. Petersburg and in 1907, at the age of 44, he graduated from the St. Petersburg University. By that time he already started writing his opus magnum, a 3-volume monograph on dynamic geology and geophysics. The work, published five years later, brought him limited fame and fortune and was awarded by the Russian Geographic Society and the Russian Academy of Sciences. In the following years he travelled to Italy, Egypt, Turkey and Greece. He also continued his work as a professor at various universities in the Russian Empire.

During World War I, in 1916, Łukaszewicz became the dean of the Faculty of Geomorphology at the Higher Course of Geography, later to be transformed into the Petersburg Institute of Geography. Following the February Revolution he also joined the Petrograd Soviet and became one of its deputies. Because of that in 1918 he was elected the first rector of the newly created Geographic Institute. However, he was disappointed with the course of the Russian Revolution of 1917 and in 1919 he returned to Lithuania. Initially serving as a supervisor of colleges at the General Commissariat of the Eastern Lands (an agenda of the Ober-Ost), he settled in Vilna and on 1 January 1920 he became a deputy professor in the Chair of Geology of the Stefan Batory University. On 1 July that year he was promoted to the rank of professor and became the head of the Chair of Physical Geology, a post he held until his death. He died on 19 October 1928 and was buried in the Rasos Cemetery in Vilnius. The largest collection of his memorabilia is preserved in the Polish Secondary School of Medininkai.

== Works ==
Łukaszewicz authored a large number of works on geology, most of them published in Russian language. He also authored memoirs on the assassination attempt he took part in, first published in a white émigré journal Byloye and then in a book form in 1920.

== Trivia ==
- Ignacy Łukasiewicz, the inventor of the kerosene lamp, was a distant relative of Józef Łukaszewicz.

== Bibliography ==
- Polskie Towarzystwo Geologiczne (1981). Rocznik Polskiego Towarzystwa Geologicznego (in Polish). Warsaw: Polskie Towarzystwo Geologiczne. pp. 1–32.
- Polish Academy of Sciences, Institute of History of Science, Education and Technology (1970). Bogdan Suchodolski (ed.). Historia nauki polskiej (in Polish). Vol. 4. Wrocław: Ossolineum. pp. 697–700. ISBN 83-04-02287-7.
- Zygmunt Łukawski (1978). Ludność polska w Rosji, 1863-1914 (in Polish). Wrocław: Ossolineum. p. 195. ISBN.
