= Karol Bohdanowicz =

Russian and Polish geologist

Professor Karol Bohdanowicz
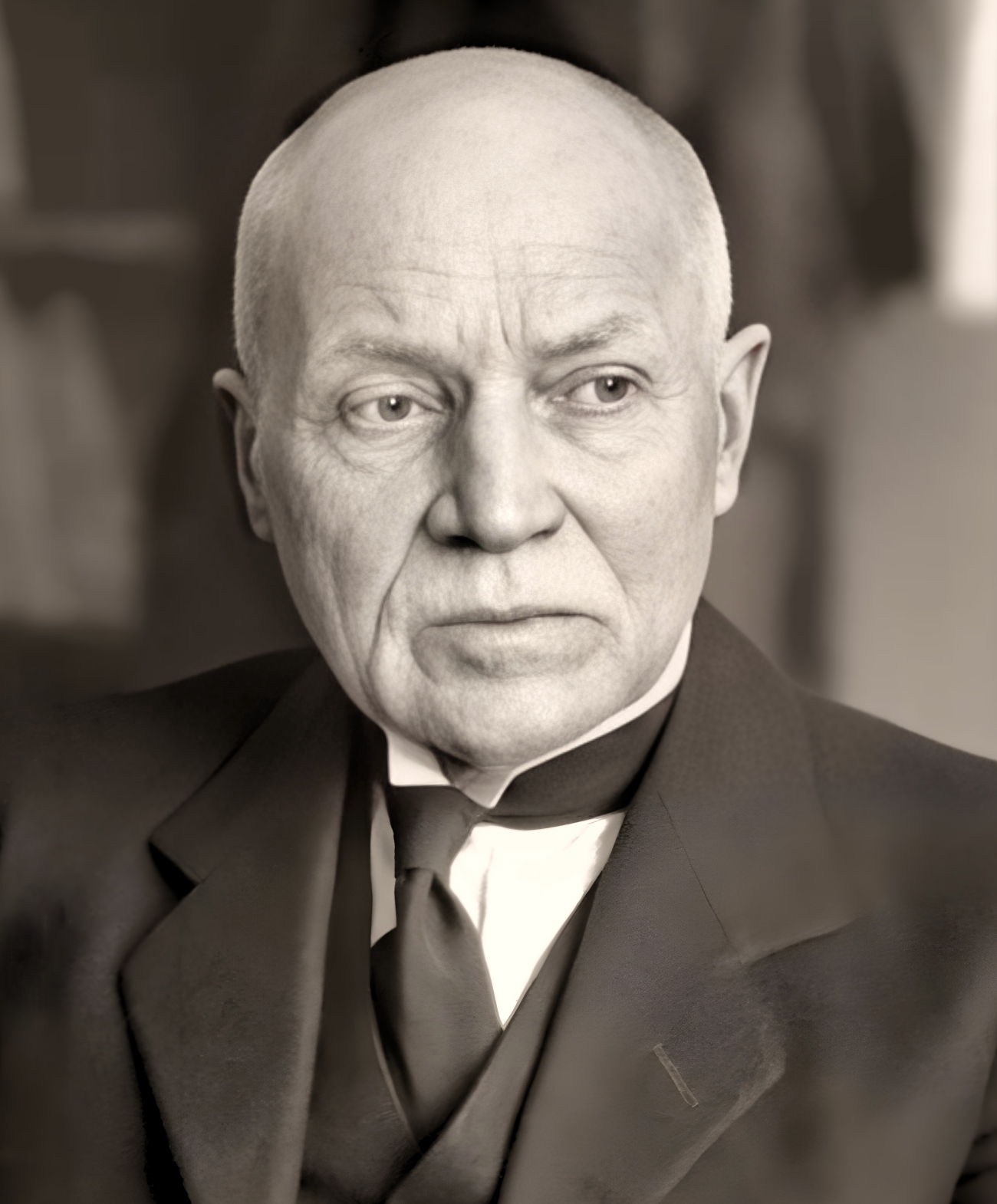
- Born: 17 (29) December 1864; Lutsyn, Lutsyn County, Vitebsk Governorate, Russian Empire
- Died: 5 June 1947 (aged 82); Warsaw, Polish People's Republic
- Citizenship: Russian Empire, Second Polish Republic
- Education: Saint Petersburg Mining University
- Awards: Konstantinovsky medal
- Scientific career
- Fields: geology engineer, geographer, geologist, mining engineer
- Workplaces: Saint Petersburg Mining University Kraków Mining Academy State Geological Institute (Warsaw)
- Academic advisors: Ivan Vasilevich Mushketov

Notes
- Member of the Polish Scientific Society in Lwów

Karol Bohdanowicz (born 29 November 1864 in Lucyn – died 5 June 1947 in Warsaw) was a Polish geologist, an expert in mining geology and physical geography. Bohdanowicz' research contributed to the construction of the Caspian railway line and enabled the estimation of oil deposits in the desert areas of the Caspian Depression. He also discovered substantial gold deposits in Siberia. He was the author of about 200 scientific papers, including a number of textbooks on geology of deposits and two monographs: 'Mineral raw materials of the world' and 'Iron ores'.

== Early life (1864–1886) ==
The son of Jan Paweł Bohdanowicz, a judge, and Zofia Bohdanowicz nee Kononowicz, Karol Bohdanowicz was born in the county town of Lucyn in the Russian Partition of Poland, then administratively part of the Vitebsk Governorate (formerly part of Polish Livonia, now Ludza, Latvia), into a Polish noble Roman Catholic family. His brother was a Russian literary critic, publicist and social activist Angel Bogdanovich. He graduated from the military gymnasium in Nizhny Novgorod in 1881, before going onto study at the Saint-Petersburg State Mining Institute in Saint Petersburg, graduating in June 1886 with the title of mining engineer. During his studies, in 1885, he took part as a collector in a geological expedition to the Ural Mountains organised by the notable Russian geologist, T. Czernyszew.

== Expeditionary and research career (1886–1901) ==
=== Studies in Turkmenistan and Iran (1886–1888) ===
After graduation, he worked as a geologist in the construction of the Zakaspian and Zlatoust railways, as a geologist surveying the geological structure of the ground on which tracks and bridges were to be built, but also explored for geological deposits in the railway construction belt, especially the hard coal necessary for the locomotives. From August 1887 for two years he managed the research on the construction of a section of the military railway line in Samarkand. His research covered the Balkhan and Kopet Dag mountains and their extension into northern Persia (Turkmen-Khorasa Mountains), almost completely unknown at that time. He studied turquoise and copper deposits near Nishapur and in 1888 he studied the mineral waters in the Novgorod Governorate.

=== Expedition to Central Asia (1889–1891) ===
Between 1889 and 1890, he took part as a geologist in the expedition of the Russian Geological Society under the leadership of Colonel M. Piewcow to Tibet and into the mountain area Kunlun and undertook particular study into the gold deposits and nephrite in the area. In the spring of 1889 the expedition set out from the western corner of Lake Issyk Kul and reached south to the village of Aktala; from there it continued west. The expedition crossed the Kashgar ridge (7719 m) south of the Kongur massif (7719 m), before heading north, west and south of the massif Muztagh Ata (7546 m ) where he found a group of glaciers. He returned to Yarkand, where he joined the expedition. At the end of the summer, he started from Kargalik to the south before reaching the Tiznaf Ridge (5360 m), turning west he crossed the Tokhtakorum Ridge (5419 m) before reaching the upper reaches of the river Yarkand and descending to the village of Niya. As a result of his three separate routes, Bogdanovich established the main features of orography of West Kunlun, established the arcuate curve of its ridges, their strong dismemberment, the presence of "diagonal-transverse valleys" and discovered the connection between Kunlun and Pamir. He began compiling the samples collected during the expedition in April 1891 at the Geological Committee in St. Petersburg, and for this work he received the Great Medal of Przewalski from the Russian Geographical Society. In December 1891 he was sent for three months to Austria, Switzerland, Belgium and Germany, for three months in order to study their national geological collections collected in Asia.

=== Research in Southern Siberia (1892–1895) ===
In 1892 he was delegated for three years to a mining expedition preparing the construction of the Trans-Siberian Railway Line as the head of the research group. The works were carried out from West Siberia to the coast of M. Ochocki. During his work near Irkutsk, he was involved in the discovery of large hard coal deposits within the Cheremkhovo basin and several nephrite deposits. From June 1895 he took part in the Okhotsk-Kamchatka Expedition (since 1898 as the head of the entire expedition), seeking gold deposits on the banks of the Sea of Okhotsk, on the west coast of Kamchatka and the Shantar Islands. The works and studies carried out by the expedition provided the basis for geological knowledge about this part of Asia that had been difficult to access. In June 1900 he was delegated for eight months to the Chukchi Peninsula and to its surroundings. In 1901 he conducted research in the eastern part Caucasus, and then he took geological photos of oil deposits in the Kuban region.

=== Expedition to the Far East and Kamchatka (1895–1898) ===
In 1895, on behalf of the Ministry of Agriculture and State Property, Bogdanovic led an expedition to study the geological structure of the Coast of Okhotsk and Kamchatka, which lasted three years. The navigator Nikolai Nikolaevich Lelyakin was assigned to the expedition as a topographer. At the end of November 1896 they set out from Nikolayevsk-on-Amur, crossed the lake Eagle and in January 1897 reached the mouth of the river Uda. In April, the two ascended a lower left tributary of the Uda and explored the southernmost parts of the Dzhugdzhur Mountains for more than 100 km. In June and July, the expedition ascended Uda and discovered Maya Ridge (secondary, 2020 m, between the rivers Uda and Maya). At the end of July, from the mouth of the Uda, the detachment set out northeast along the coast, resulting in several deposits of gold being discovered. Between the Uda River and the settlement Ayan, Bogdanovich and Lelyakin discovered the 225 km long Coastal Ridge (1662 m). From Ayan they were transferred to Okhotsk, where they separated. From there, in January 1898, Bogdanovic returned to Ayan, exploring the entire coast and southeastern slopes of Dzhugdzhur for 550 km. Lelyakin from Okhotsk heads east to Taui Bay, describing and accurately mapping its eastern part - Odyan Bay and the peninsula enclosing it from the south Horses. Further east, Lelyakin describes and maps the bay Zabiyak and the peninsula Pyagin. From Ajan, Bogdanovich was transferred to the mouth of the river Tigil on the west bank of the Kamchatka peninsula. Climbing the Tigil to its springs, where he found pendulum-type glaciers, he headed southwest along the ridge of Central Ridge (3621 m) and reach the springs of the river Oblukovina . Along the way, he discovered the extinct volcano Hangar (2000 m). It crossed the Central Ridge twice (at about 57º 30` N) and descended to the Pacific Ocean along the river Kamchatka (758 km) in August 1898. Based on materials collected from the 1901 expedition, the two drew a map of the coast of the Sea of Okhotsk from the mouth of the Amur to Okhotsk. In the autumn of 1898, Bogdanovich conducted geological research in the southern part of the peninsula Liaodong.

In 1895, in recognition of his merits in the field of geographical discoveries, he was appointed an honorary member of the Dutch Geographical Society, in 1900 he received a gold medal at the Universal Exhibition in Paris for topographic and geological maps of the shores of the Sea of Okhotsk, and in 1902 he received the Gold Medal Konstantinowski from the Russian Geographical Society.

=== Expedition to Chukotka (1900) and research in the Caucasus (1901) ===
In 1900, again as a geologist, he took part in the expedition of the retired Guards Colonel Vladimir Mikhailovich Vonlyarlyarsky to Chukotka to search for gold deposits and by order of the Committee of Geology in 1901 he conducted geological research in East Caucasus and twice crossed the Main Ridge.

In June 1901 he was accepted to the position of geologist at the Geological Committee in St. Petersburg, the main geological office of the country, and from January 1903, after taking 'habilitation', additionally as an associate professor at the Department of Geology at the Mining Institute, also lecturing geology at the Institute of Communication Engineers. In October 1907 he was promoted to the position of senior geologist in the Geology Committee.

In August 1908 he went for one month to Caucasus, for the study of mineral waters (source 'Narzan'). In February 1909 he stayed a month in Italy, studying the problems caused by earthquakes. From June 1909, he studied the kuban oil region for four months. He spent the next four months there in the summer 1910. In the same year he was involved in oil exploration in Austria and Romania.

In May 1911 he was appointed a full professor at the Department of Geology at the St Petersberg Mining Institute, while still working as a senior geologist at the Geological Committee. He supported Polish scientists and students, including Józef Łukaszewicz. Bohdanowicz's students included Dmitri Iwanowitsch Muschketow, Alexander Nikolajewitsch Sawarizki, Iwan Michailowitsch Gubkin and Dmitri Wassiljewitsch Naliwkin.

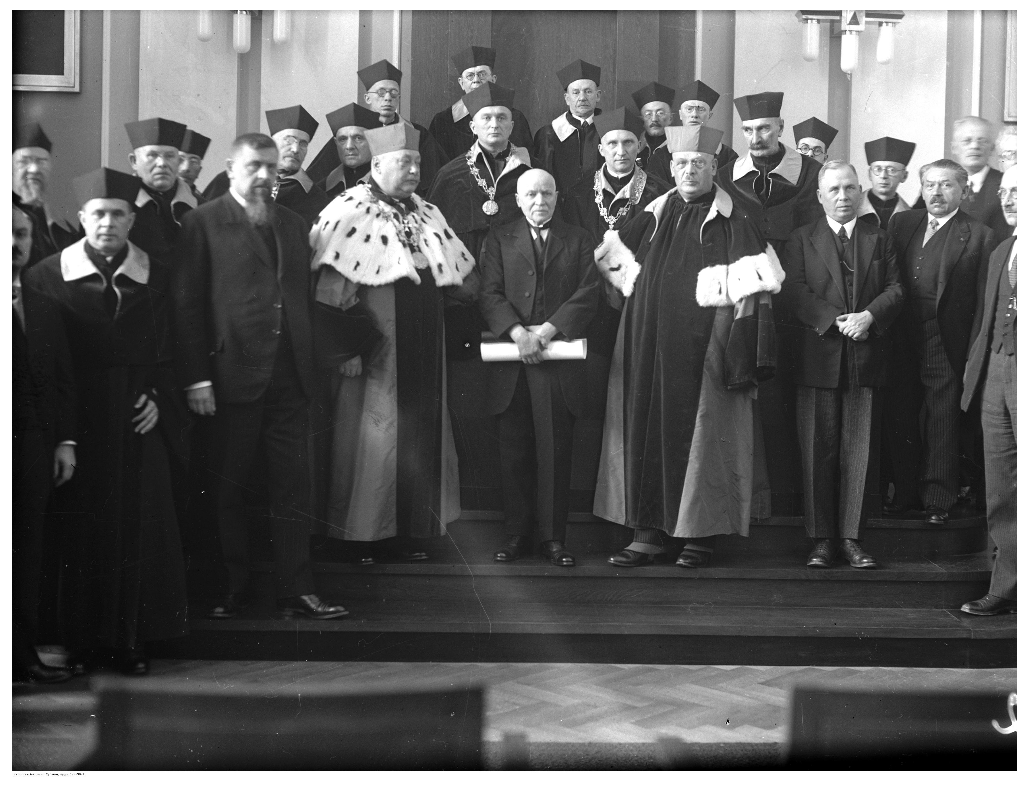
Photo from the celebration of 50 years of scientific activity of Prof. Bohdanovich, Academy of Mining and Metallurgy in Kraków, 1935

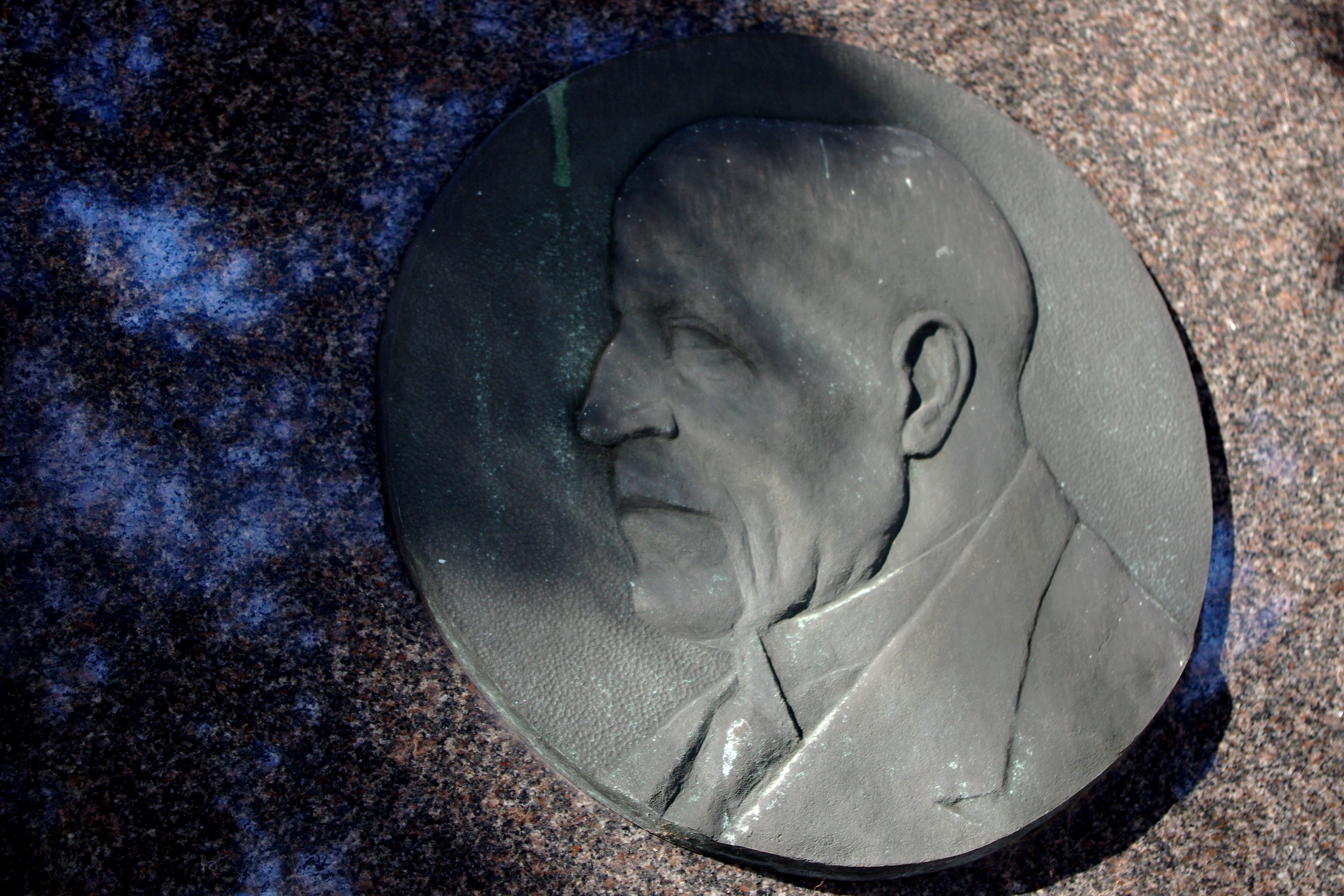
The grave of geologist Karol Bohdanowicz in Aleja Zasłużonych at the Powązki Cemetery in Warsaw

For four months during the summer of 1911, he explored areas affected by the 1911 Kebin earthquake in Turkestan ( Tien Shan ). He left a trace himself in the local toponymics in the name of the Bohdanowicz Glacier, which was received by the glacier closest to Almaty. For the next four months, he conducted research in Kuban. He continued this research for two months in the summer 1912, in order to aid the exploration and production of crude oil around Baku and in Kazakhstan.

Due to his interests, he went on short-term trips to the island of Java and to California to learn about modern equipment and methods of oil extraction. Later, based on his mining experience from the Caucasus, he worked as an expert in exploring oil deposits in many countries of the world.

On 12 January 1913 he was appointed deputy director of the Geological Committee, and on 24 February 1914, after the death of T. Czernyszew, he became the director of this institution (the nomination was signed by Tsar Nicholas II on 28 January 1915). In 1914 he became director of Geolkom as the successor to Feodossi Nikolajewitsch Tschernyschows. In 1916 he was delegated by the Russian government to Spain and Portugal to examine the local deposits tungsten and platinum. In May 1918, the Council of the Mining Institute appointed him for two years as the dean of the Faculty of Geology and Exploration. The same Council later dismissed him from the composition of the professor at the Mining Institute on 1 October 1919.

=== Life in Poland (1919–) ===
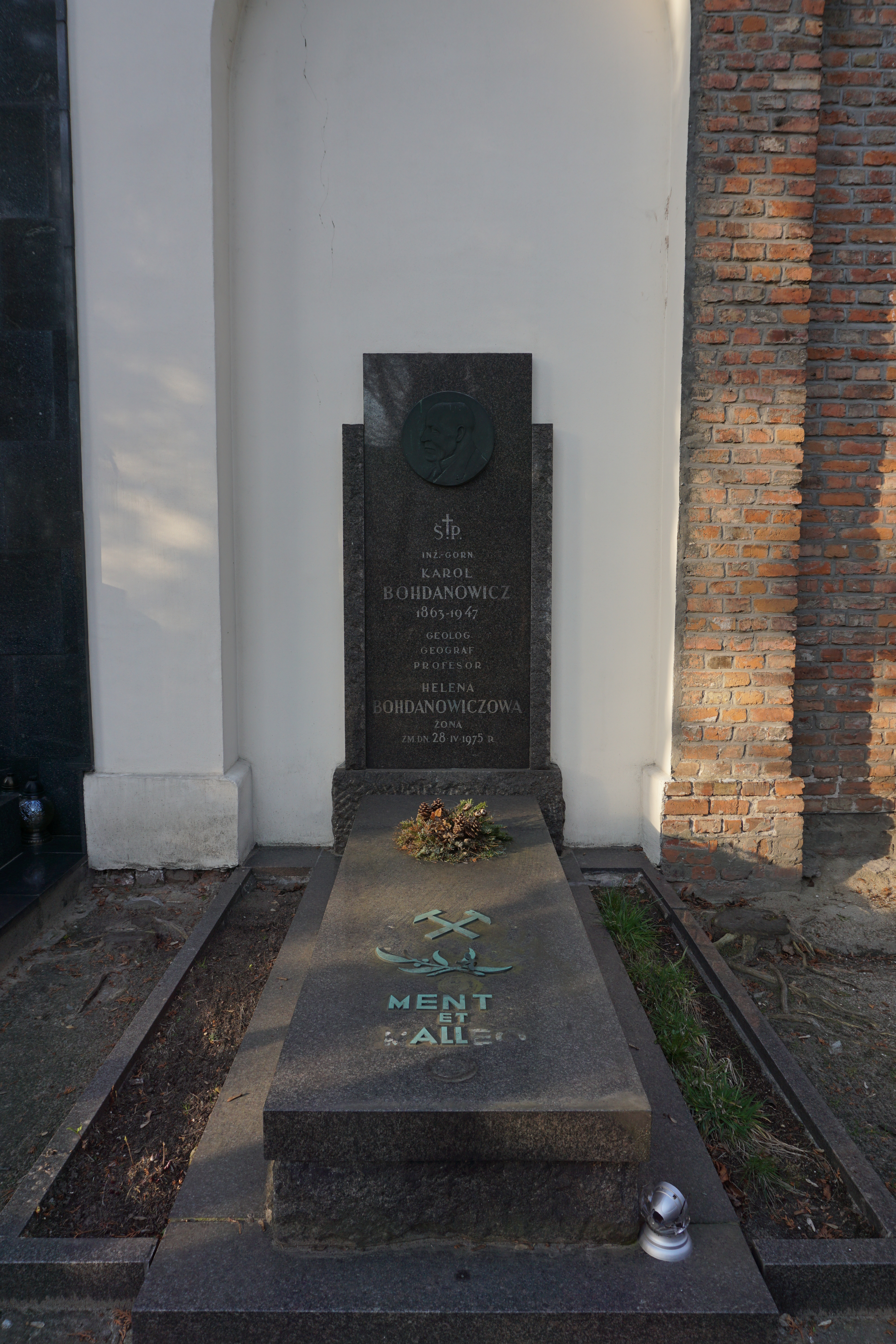
The grave of Karol Bohdanowicz at the Powązki Cemetery

Bohdanowicz came back to the Russian Partition of Poland for the first time in 1905 as a manager of a geological works in the Dąbrowa Basin. His purpose was to be an expert opinion on the occurrence of hard coal and metal ores in the area dolomitic limestone units. In 1917 he made contact with Polish Economic Council in Saint Petersburg. In October 1917 he presented his dissertation Mineral deposits of Polish lands. His other works related to Poland also appeared at that time.

After World War I he moved to his now liberated homeland of Poland in July 1919. In Warsaw, he became the head of the representative office of the oil company 'Bracia Nobel' ('Standard Nobel') in Poland. He worked in this capacity until 1938. From 1919 he explored the oil fields in Poland (Bitków, Borysław). In addition to the study of crude oil deposits in the Carpathians, he published important studies on the ore deposits zinc in and lead from Olkusz.

At the same time, in July 1921, the Chief of State appointed Bohdanowicz a full professor of applied geology and from autumn this year Bohdanowicz lectured in the Department of Applied Geology at the University of Mining and Metallurgy (now AGH University of Science and Technology Stanisław Staszic in Krakow | University of Mining]] in Krakow. He travelled abroad many times as an expert. among others in 1920 he explored oil fields in France, in 1922 in Latvia, and in 1923 again in France and Algeria. During the 16th International Geological Congress in 1933 he became acquainted with the conditions of occurrence of mineral deposits in North America. In 1935 he retired and was appointed honorary professor of the Mining Academy.

He was the (first) chairman of the Polish Geological Society and the Polish Geographical Society. He was vice president of Societé Géologique de France, an ordinary member Polish Academy of Arts and Sciences, Academy of Technical Sciences, and the Warsaw Scientific Society .

On 14 April 1938 he was appointed the director of the Polish Geological Institute and remained until his death on 5 June 1947. He married Helena Bohdanowicz.

He is buried at Old Powązki Cemetery in Warsaw (Aleja Zasłużłużego, row 1, m. 28).

== Decorations ==
- Awarded the title of Active State Councillor by Emperor's decree (29 March 1909).
- Order of Saint Vladimir Third class, 1913.
- Order of Saint Stanislaus First class, 1915.
- Commander's Cross with the Star of the Order of Polonia Restituta (29 January 1946),
- Commander's Cross of the Order of Polonia Restituta (19 March 1936).

== Awards ==
- 1900 - Gold Medal of the Universal Exhibition in Paris for maps of his authorship,
- 1901 - Konstantinovsky Medal from Imperial Russian Geographical Society
- 1902 - great medal Przewalski Russian Geographical Society and Konstantinowski gold medal,
- 1905 - Helmersen prize of the Russian Academy of Sciences for geological works.

== Essays and papers ==
Author and editor of more than 270 scientific papers, among them:

- „To the geology of Central Asia. Description of some sedimentary formations of the Transcaspian region and part of northern Persia "" ("Zap. Min. Obshch.", Vol. XXVI, 1889);
- 'Geological research in East Turkestan "' '(" Proceedings of the Tibetan Expedition 1889 - 90 under the leadership of MV Pevtsov ", Part II, 1892);
- „From a trip to the central. Asia ” (Gorn. Zhurn., 1892, № 4 - 5, pp. 84 – 157);
- 'North-West Tibet, Quen-Lun and Kashgaria' '(Izv. Geogr. Society., Vol. XXVII, 1892, pp. 480 – 504);
- „Geological research along the Siberian Railway. d. in 1893 ” (Gorn. Zhurn., 1894, № 9 and 10);
- 'Materials on the geology and minerals of the Irkutsk province.' (Gorn. Zhurn., 1895, № 10, 11, 12);
- „Geological research and exploration works along the Siberian Railway. d. “ (issue 2, 1896, pp. 1 - 294);
- "Essay on the activities of the Okhotsk-Kamchatka mountain expedition 1895 - 98" "(Izv. Geogr. Obshch.", XXXV, 1899, issue, VI);
- 'Geological description of the Kwantung region and its gold deposits (Materials on the Geology of Russia, vol. XX, 1900, pp. 1 - 237);
- 'Two intersections of the Main Caucasian ridge' '("Proceedings of the Geological Committee", vol. XIX, 1902, pp. 1 – 209).
