= Nikolay Pogrebov =

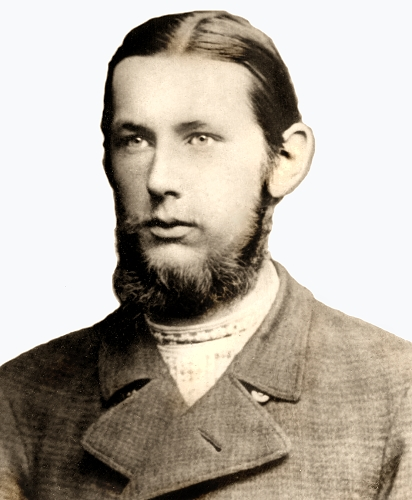
- Born: 17 November 1860; Saint Petersburg, Russian Empire
- Died: 10 January 1942 (aged 81); Leningrad, Soviet Union
- Resting place: Smolensky Cemetery
- Citizenship: Russian/Soviet Union
- Education: Saint Petersburg Mining Institute
- Known for: Studies of the Baltic Oil Shale Basin
- Awards: Honored Scientist of the RSFSR (1940)
- Scientific career
- Fields: Hydrogeology
- Workplaces: Saint Petersburg Geology Committee; Leningrad Mining Institute

Nikolay Pogrebov, (Russian: Николай Фёдорович Погребов; 17 November [O.S. 5 November] 1860 – 10 January 1942) was a Russian and Soviet hydrogeologist and an engineering geologist. In 1884–1887, he studied in and was graduated from the Saint Petersburg Mining Institute. In 1897–1919 he worked as the librarian and archivist of the Saint Petersburg Geology Committee. He was a professor at Leningrad Mining Institute from 1931 to 1936.

In 1902, he studied the Baltic Oil Shale Basin. In 1916, the Geology Committee asked Pogrebov to search information about oil shale in Estonia. In April 1916, the Petrograd Main Committee for Fuels sent him to Estonia to study oil shale. From July to November 1916, the geological survey of the resource was performed under his guidance. He oversaw the construction of the first experimental oil shale open-pit in Estonia. In 1916–1923, he published a series papers on this subject.

In 1921, during the Tagantsev conspiracy trial he was sentenced for two years custody in the forced labour camp. He was released in 1922.

In 1930 he organized the Crimea Landslide Monitoring Station. He was Chairman of the 1st all-Union Congress of Hydrogeologists in 1931 and the 1st all-Union Meeting of Landslide in 1934. In 1940, he was given the honorary title of Honored Scientist of the RSFSR.
