= Saint Petersburg Mining University =

Technical college in St. Petersburg, Russia

Coordinates: 59.92923°N 30.26945°E

Saint Petersburg Mining University of Empress Catherine II
- Санкт-Петербургский горный университет императрицы Екатерины II
- Former names: Leningrad Mining Institute; National Mineral Resources University
- Motto: Усердие к услуге Отечества и к пользе оного любовь
- Motto in English: Diligence in conducting the affairs of the Fatherland and love for the good thereof
- Type: Public
- Established: 1773; 253 years ago
- Rector: Vladimir Litvinenko
- Academic staff: 5,000
- Students: 16,500
- Location: Saint Petersburg, Russia
- Website: en.spmi.ru
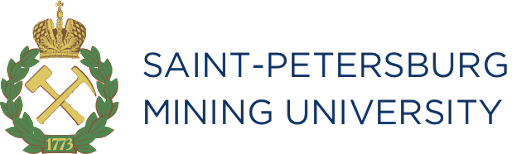

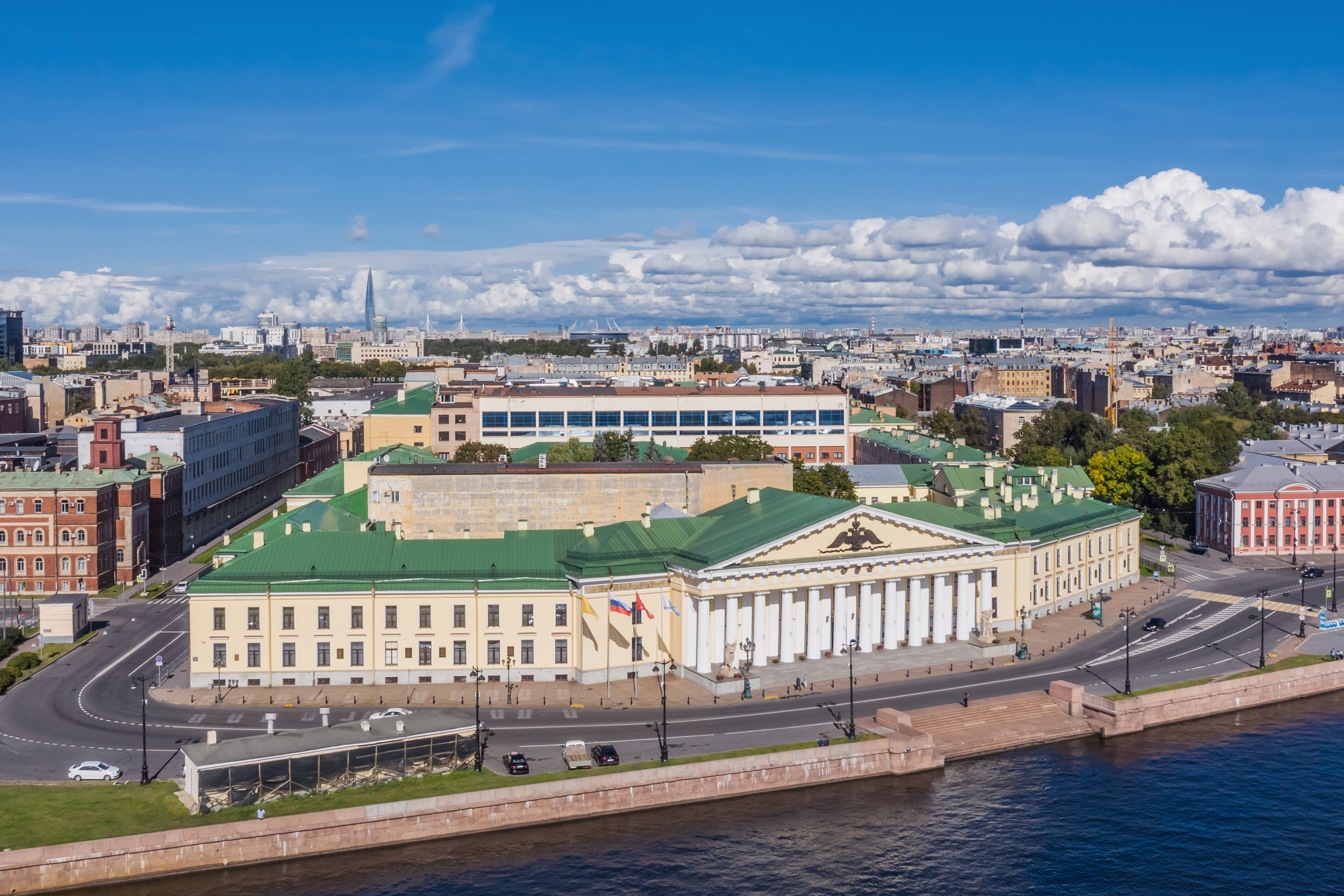
- The building of the Mining Academy (1811) is a Neoclassical work by Andrey Voronikhin.

General information
- Estimated completion: 1811

University rankings

Regional – Overall
- QS Emerging Europe and Central Asia: 168 (2022)

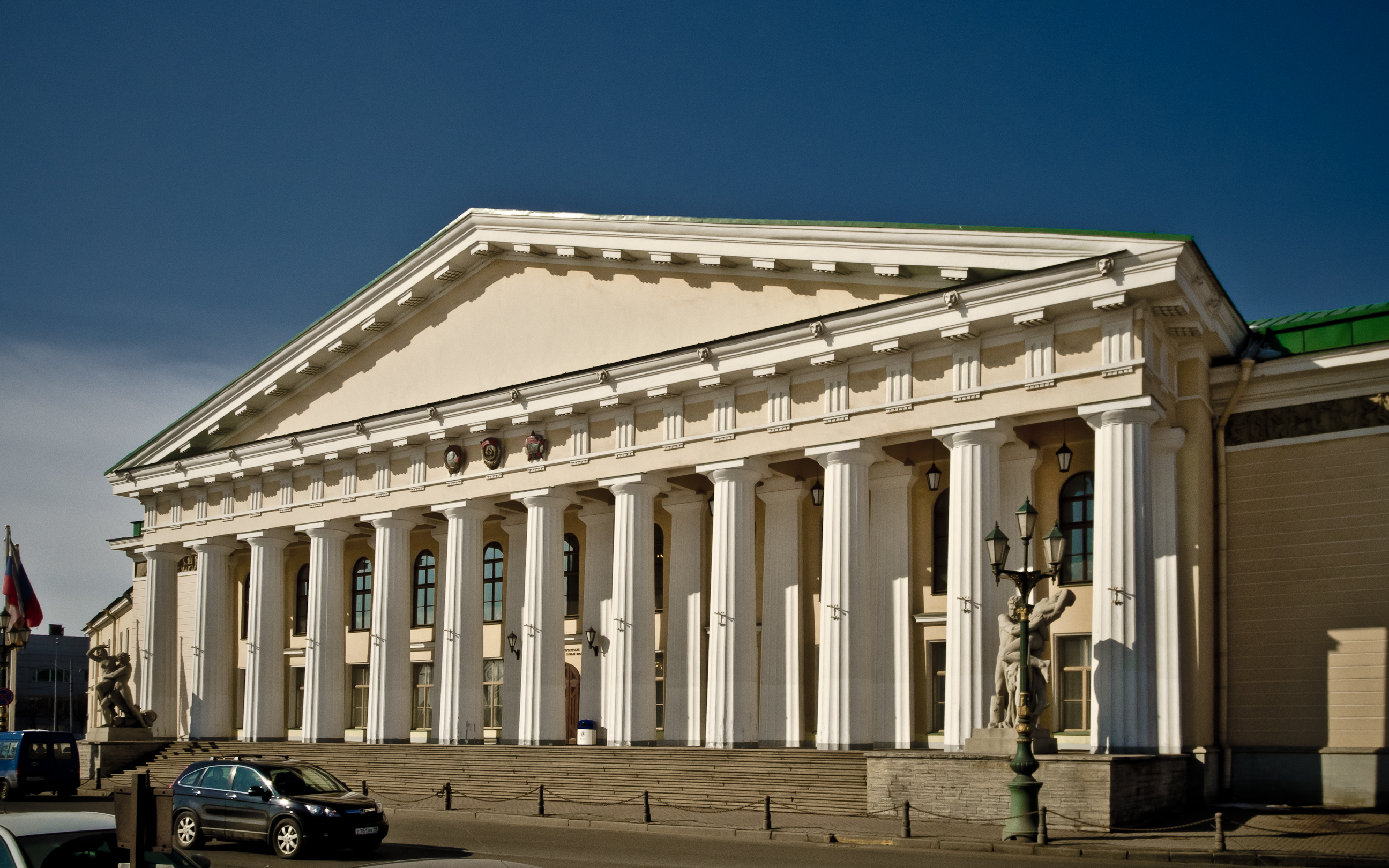
Colonnade of the Mining Institute building

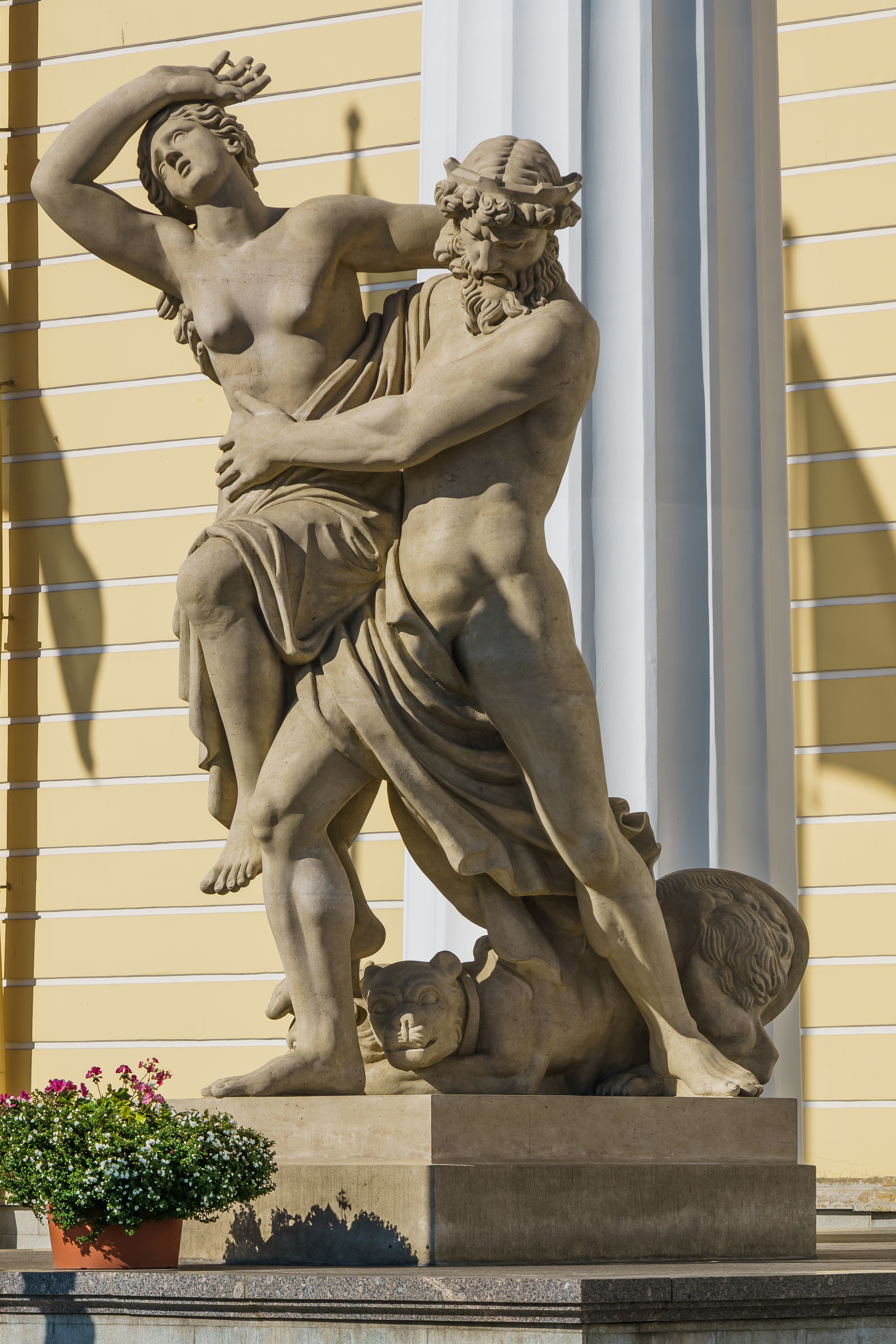
The Rape of Proserpina statue

Saint Petersburg Mining University of Empress Catherine II (Russian: Санкт-Петербургский горный университет императрицы Екатерины II) is the oldest technical university of Russia and one of the oldest technical universities in Europe.

The university was founded on October 21, 1773, by Empress Catherine the Great, who realised an idea proposed by Peter the Great and Mikhail Lomonosov for training engineers for mining and metal industries. Having a strong engineering profession was seen by many Russian rulers as a vital means of maintaining Russia's status as a great power. As historian Alfred J. Rieber wrote, "The marriage of technology and central state power had a natural attraction for Peter the Great and his successors, particularly Paul I, Alexander I, and Nicholas I". All three had had a military education and had seen the achievements of the engineers of revolutionary and imperial France, who had reconstructed the great highways, unified the waterways and erected buildings throughout Europe in a more lasting tribute to the French than all of Napoleon's victories.

Though located in St. Petersburg, the university is on a federal rather than local level and has partnerships with global oil, gas, and mining companies, as well as governments. Its museum is home to one of the world's finest collections of gems and mineral samples, and the university building is a Neoclassical masterpiece designed by Andrey Voronikhin.

== History ==
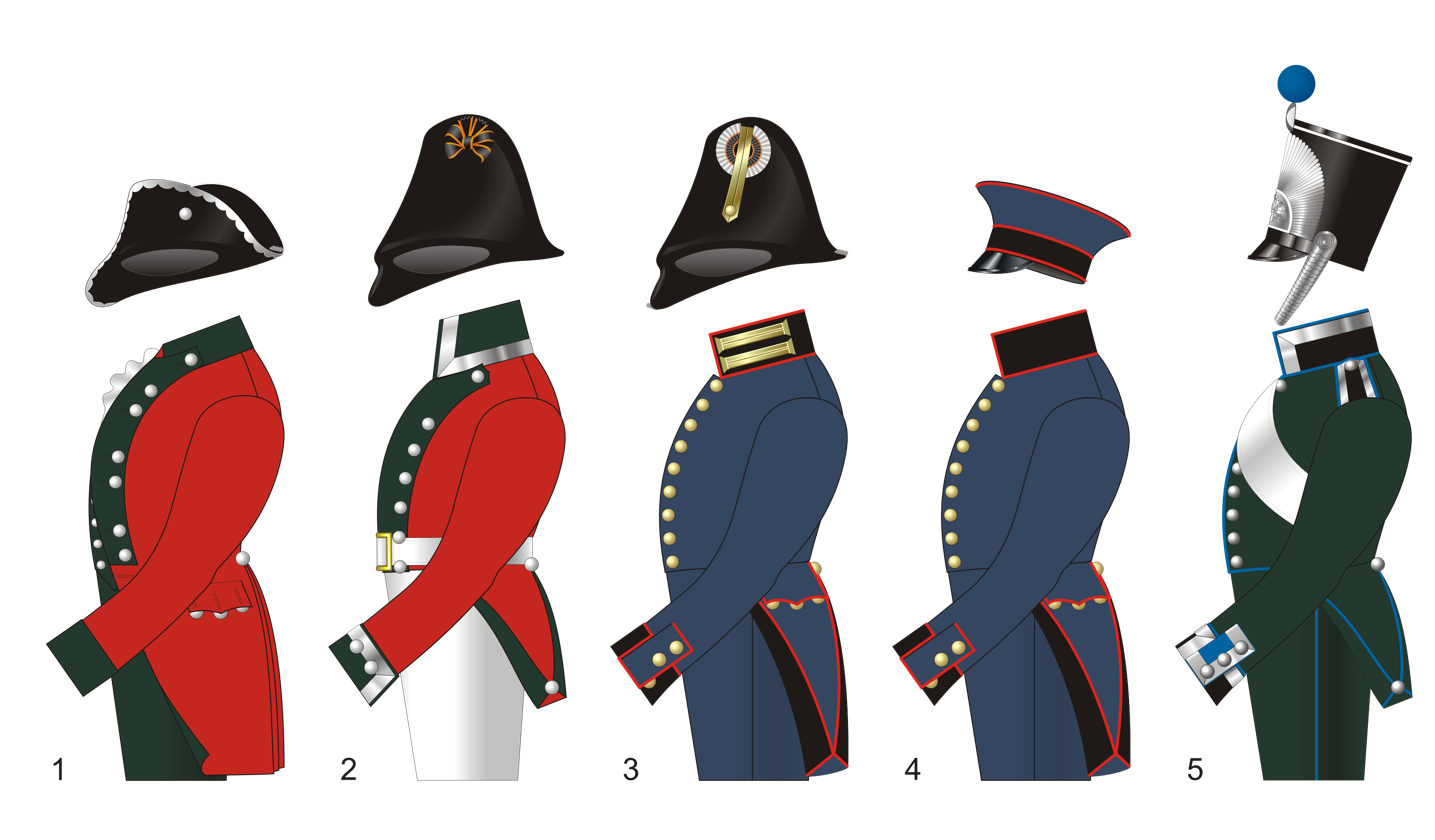
Uniforms of the Mining Institute, late 18th–mid 19th century: 1. Lecturer of the Mining School, 1794; 2. Cadet (Unteroffizier) of the Mining Cadet Corps, 1804; 3. Student (senior pupil) of the Mining Institute, 1833–1834; 4. Junior pupil of the Mining Institute, 1833–1834; 5. Cadet (Unteroffizier) of the Institute of the Corps of Mining Engineers, 1834–1848

The university was first known as the Mining School (Горное училище) until 1804, when it became the Mining Cadet Corps (Горный кадетский корпус); in 1833, it became the Institute of the Corps of Mining Engineers (Институт корпуса горных инженеров). Since 1866, it has been known as the Mining Institute (Горный институт). It is still widely known in Russia as Gorny, or 'Mining', referring to its previous name. During the Soviet period, it was renamed after Georgi Plekhanov, who attended the institute in the 1870s, becoming known as the G. V. Plekhanov Leningrad State Mining Institute and Technical University. Between 1958 and 1960, a branch of the institute was opened in Vorkuta, along with night schools in Slantsy, Monchegorsk, and Kirovsk. Since 1869 the institute has also been the headquarters of the Russian Mineralogical Society.

During the Siege of Leningrad, the building was used as a manufacturing base for producing explosives and grenades.

The university also houses a church, dedicated to St. Macarius of Egypt, which first opened its doors in 1805. It was closed, along with other churches, by the Soviet government in 1918, and was used first as a cinema and then as a gym, which resulted in damage to the interior. However, in 1996 it was recognized once more as a church and restored fully and is now functional.

The university was renamed Saint Petersburg State Mining University in 2011, and, after merging with the North-West Open Technical University in 2012, it was known as the National Mineral Resources University. The university was renamed Saint Petersburg Mining University in 2016.

== Building ==
The university is housed in a grand neoclassicist building with a 12-column portico on the banks of the Neva River on the south shore of Vasilievsky Island. It is the first building that can be seen from ships travelling into the city from the Gulf of Finland, and is a prime example of the monumental neoclassicist style favoured in Imperial Russia in the early 1800s. Russian scholars call this architecture classicist, while in the west it is known as neoclassicist, because trends in architecture came to Russia later than in the West.

Architect Andrey Voronikhin completed the building in 1806–11. He also designed the Kazan Cathedral – inspired by St. Peter's Basilica in Rome – at Nevsky Prospect, as well as buildings at Paul I's estate at Pavlovsk Palace south of the city. He also remodelled the interiors of the baroque Stroganov Palace in neoclassical style. The design of the university building reflects the idea that mining is a harsh and difficult pursuit – as well as symbolising the entry into the underground world of Pluto through the portico, decorated with 12 columns of the Doric order.

On the left-hand side of the steps at the entrance to the university is a sculpture by Vasily Demut-Malinovsky, who designed decorations and sculptures for many of the city’s churches, palaces, and monuments. The Abduction of Proserpina depicts how the Roman goddess Proserpina is seized and taken to the underworld by Pluto and is after the original The Rape of Proserpina by Italian artist Gian Lorenzo Bernini (1621–22), which provided the inspiration for many artists. Its powerful forms and heavy proportions are determined by their position and function as a decoration of the huge portico, and the sculpture together with the portico are typical of Russian town planning in the beginning of the 19th century.

On the right-hand-side of the entrance to the university is the Hercules and Antaeus sculpture by Stepan Pimenov, one of the leading Russian sculptors of the early 19th century, who also created sculptural decorations for the Kazan Cathedral, the Admiralty, and many other palaces and monuments in St Petersburg, and who had worked closely with Demut-Malinovsky since 1802. The statue shows Hercules winning in a struggle with Antaeus, who had defeated most of his previous opponents up to that point.

In 1830 Pimenov fell out of favour with Tsar Nicholas I, seemingly over his sculptures to decorate the Narva Triumphal Arch, built in 1814 to mark the Russian victory over Napoleon, but most probably because of his portraits of the Tsar, which Nicholas did not take a liking to.

Pimenov was dismissed by the Tsar and died three years later, at the age of 49.

The two sculptures symbolise the earth, its power and wealth – Antaeus’ strength lay in his contact with Mother Earth, and Demut-Malinovsky’s Rape of Proserpina also shows a struggle – and the dynamism of each sculpture contrasts with the solidity of the large portico.

== Traditions ==
Unusually for a non-military establishment, the university has a uniform worn by all staff and students. When it was first opened in the 1700s, students wore a double-breasted red uniform with a white collar and gold trimmings. The uniform was dropped for a number of years before being reintroduced in 2000 with the aim of reviving the traditions of Russia's first technical college. The Russian railways is another non-military organisation where staff still wear a uniform. In 2013, Russia began issuing new sets of stamps showing uniforms, such as those of communications and post office workers, from the 1600s to the present. Russian mining engineers in general wore uniforms, seemingly as part of efforts to bring the profession closer to the military.

== Science ==
One of the key achievements of the university's scientists has been the invention of techniques to drill through several miles of Antarctic ice to reach the sub-glacial Lake Vostok. Professor Nikolai Vasiliev, head of the drilling department at the university, has led the drilling efforts, while scientific research into the layers of ice that cover the lake, the possibility of new forms of microbial life existing in the lake, and a host of other areas of research connected to the lake are based at the Arctic and Antarctic Research Institute, the Petersburg Nuclear Physics Institute, the All-Russian Research Institute of Geology and Mineral Resources of the World Ocean (VNIIOkeangeologia), the Institute of Geography in Moscow, the Limnological Institute in Irkutsk and the Laboratory for Glaciology and Environmental Geophysics in Grenoble, France. Lake Vostok is one of the world's most closely watched scientific projects, and the expertise of the Russian drillers, directed by Professor Vasiliev, is recognised.

== Controversies ==
Vladimir Litvinenko has been rector since 1994 and has close links to Vladimir Putin, who defended his doctoral thesis at the institute in 1996. Litvinenko oversaw Putin's work, which is alleged to include significant amounts of plagiarism and is speculated perhaps to have not even been written by Putin (i.e. that he paid somebody to write it for him). Litvinenko has been criticised for not spotting plagiarism.

== Notable alumni ==
=== Alumni ===
The list of University alumni includes specialists, who discovered open fields and projected productions. Such are geologists Alexander Karpinsky, Vladimir Obruchev, the founder of the oil doctrine Ivan Gubkin, and many others.

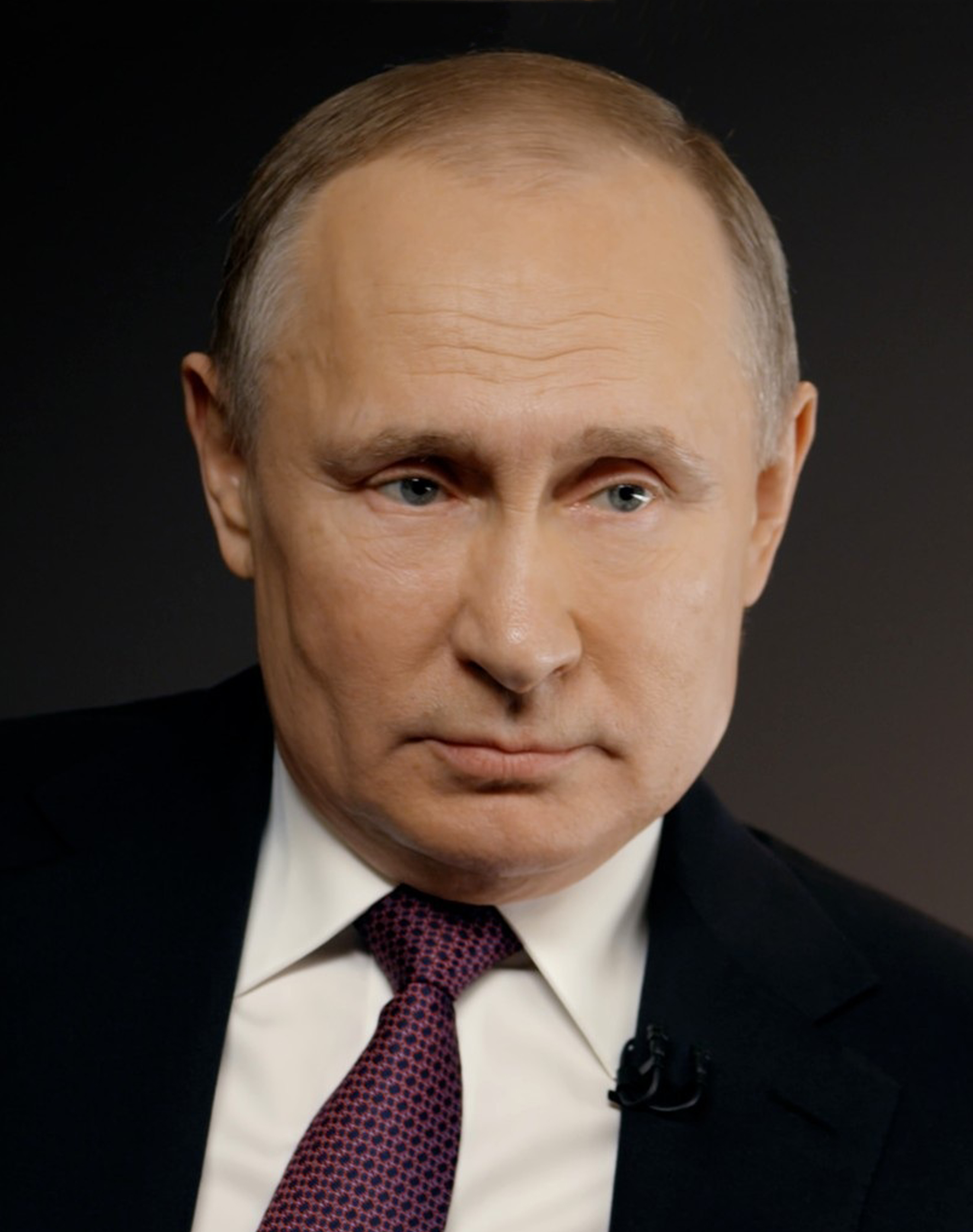
Vladimir Putin, is a Russian politician and former intelligence officer who is serving as the current President of Russia.

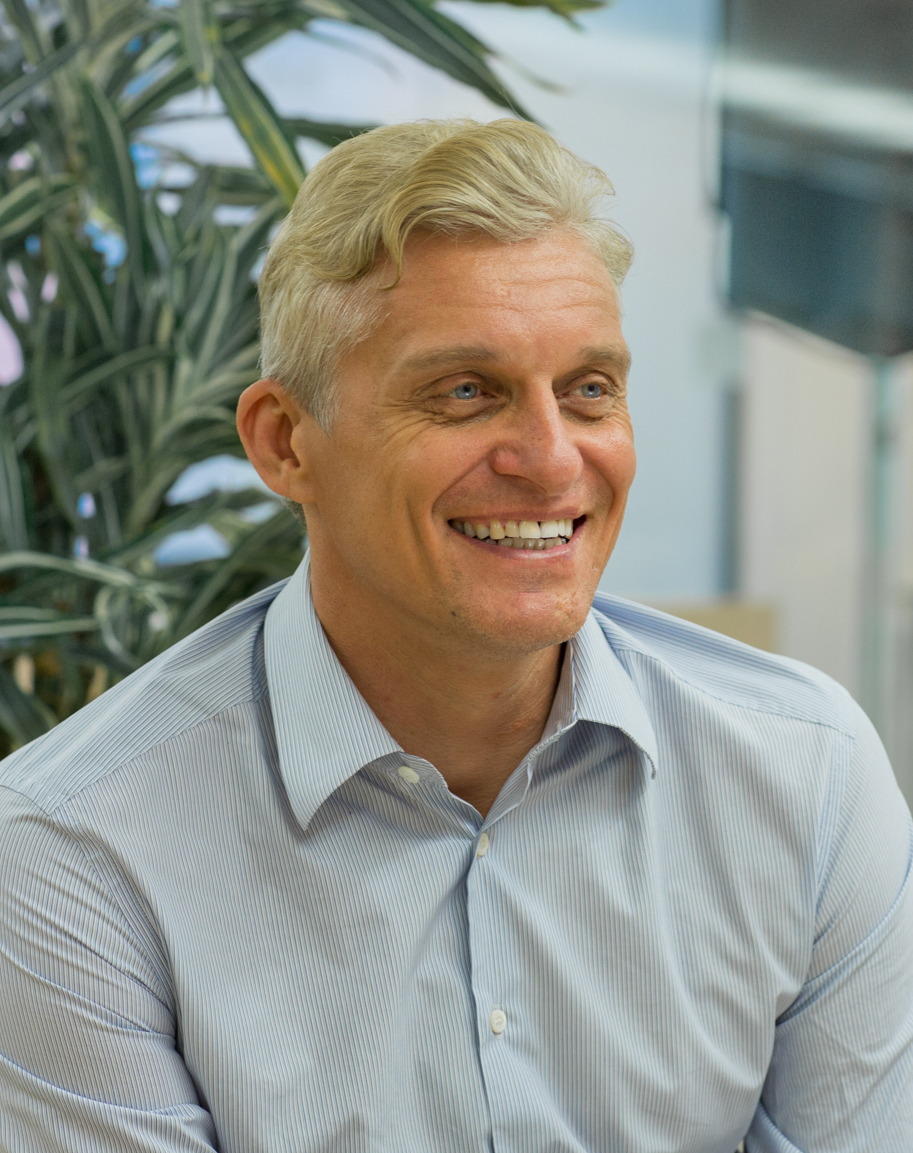
Oleg Tinkov, is a Russian entrepreneur and businessman.

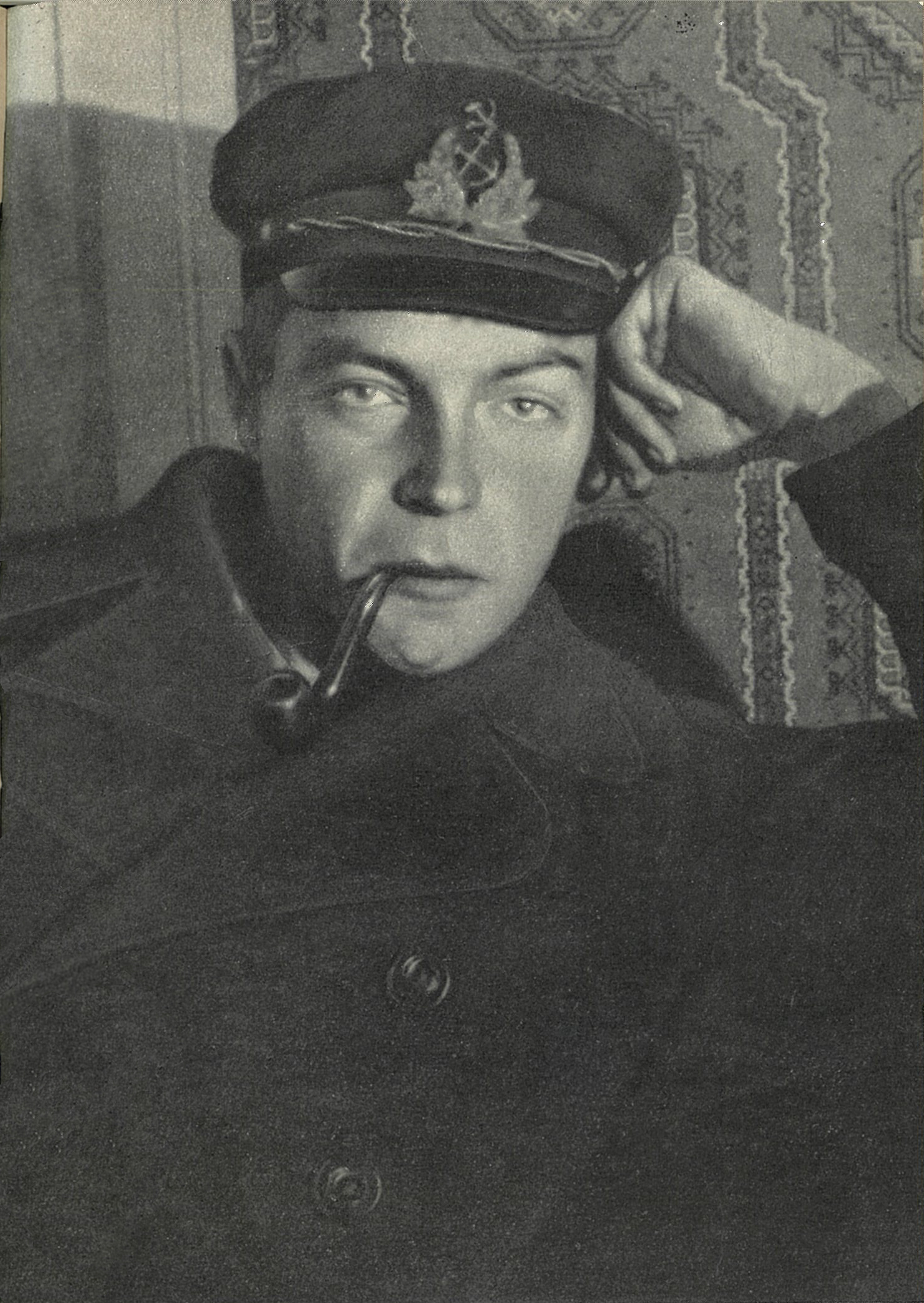
Ivan Yefremov, was a Soviet paleontologist. Founder of taphonomy, the study of fossilization patterns.

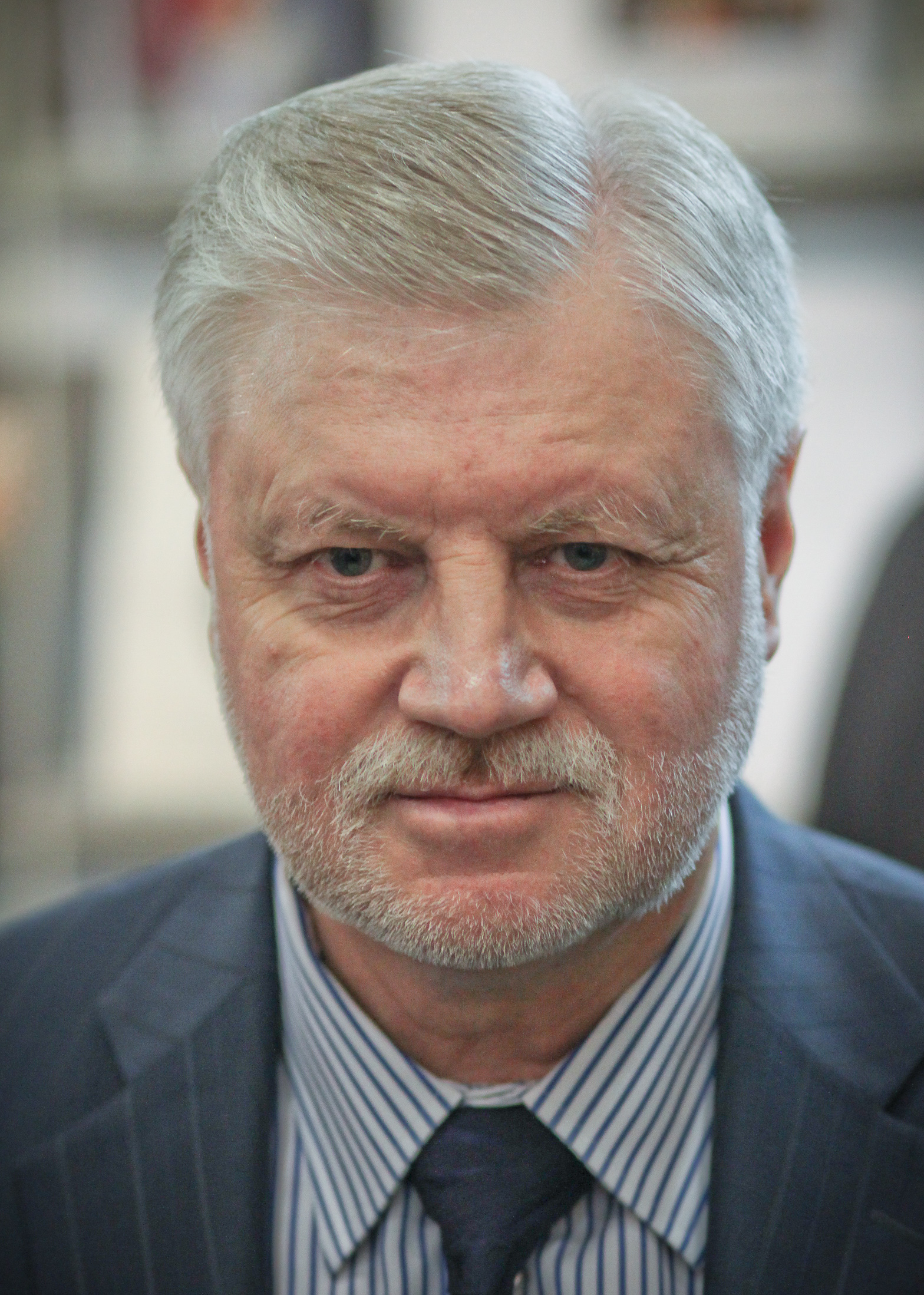
Sergey Mironov, is a Russian politician. He was Chairman of the Federation Council, the upper house of the Russian parliament, from 2001 to 2011.

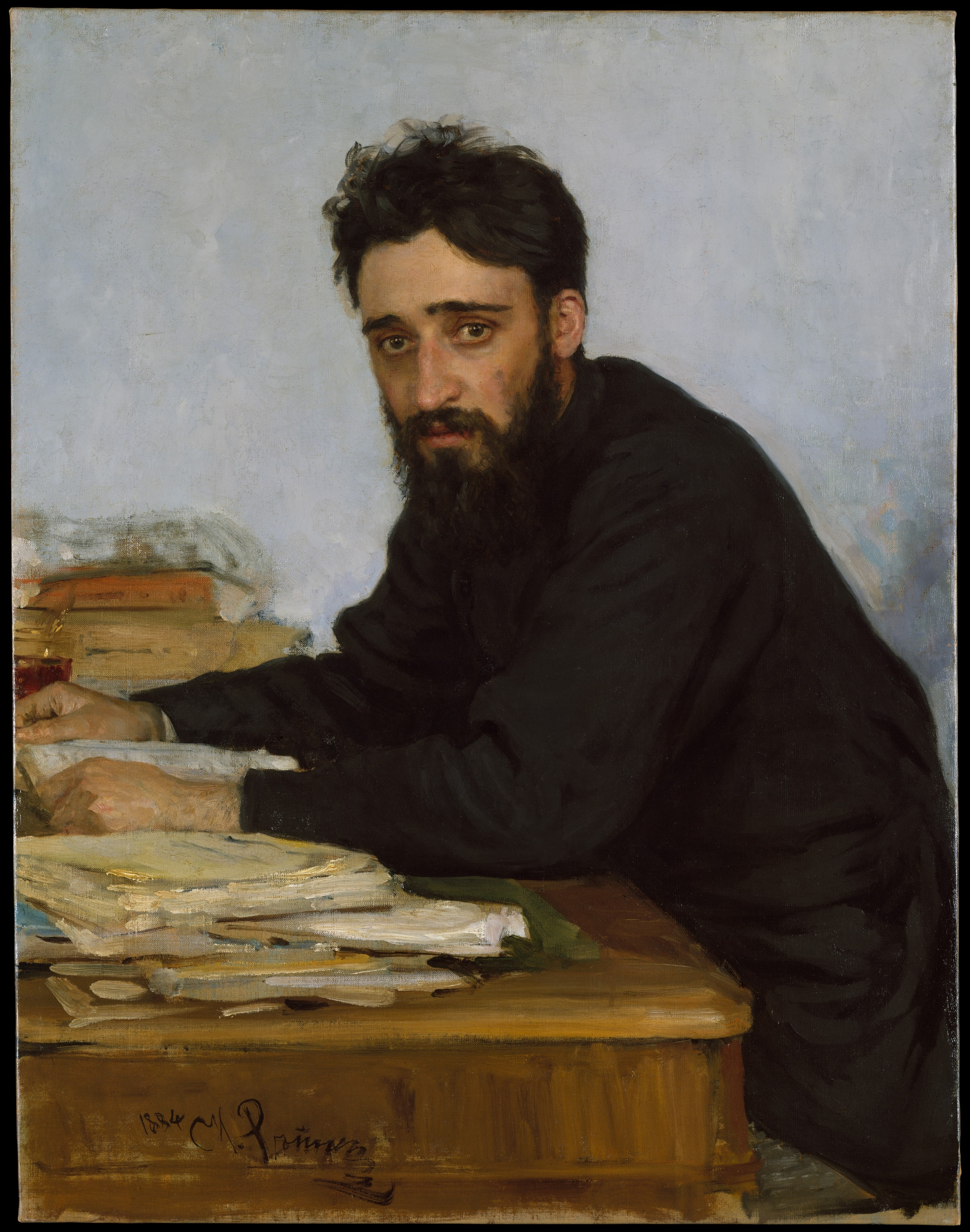
Vsevolod Garshin, was a Russian author of short stories.

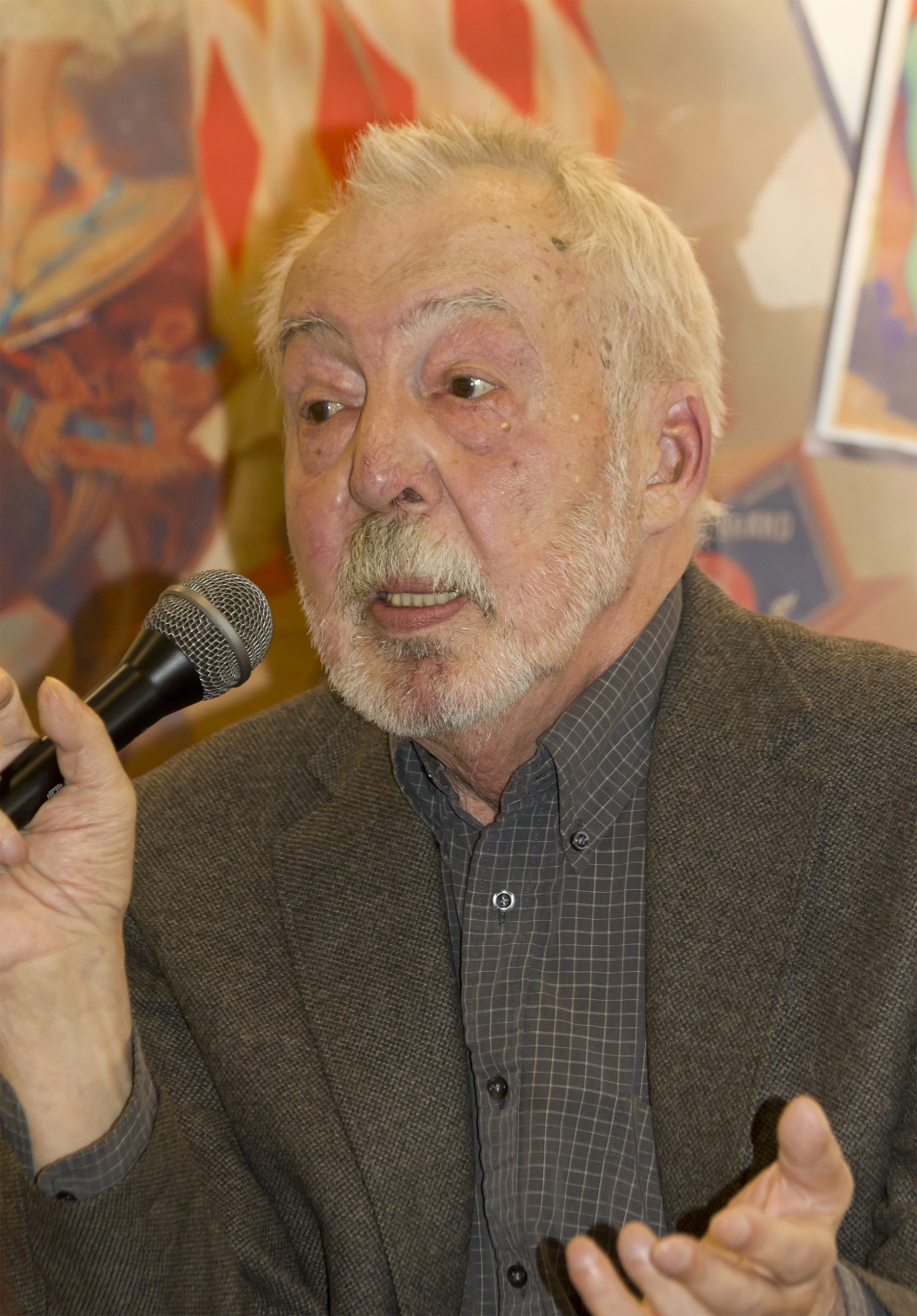
Andrei Bitov, was a prominent Russian writer of Circassian ancestry.

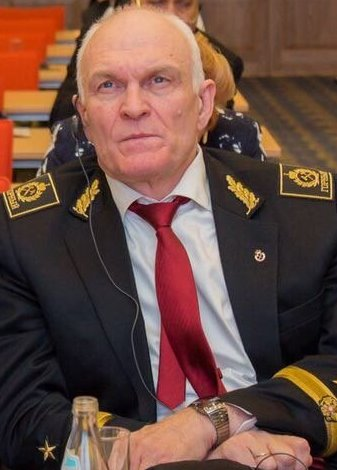
Vladimir Litvinenko, is a Russian academic, billionaire, businessman and Vladimir Putin's campaign manager.

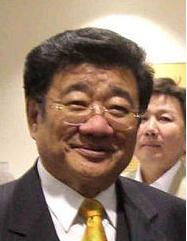
Punsalmaagiin Ochirbat, Mongolian political figure. He served as a president of Mongolia from 1990 to 1997

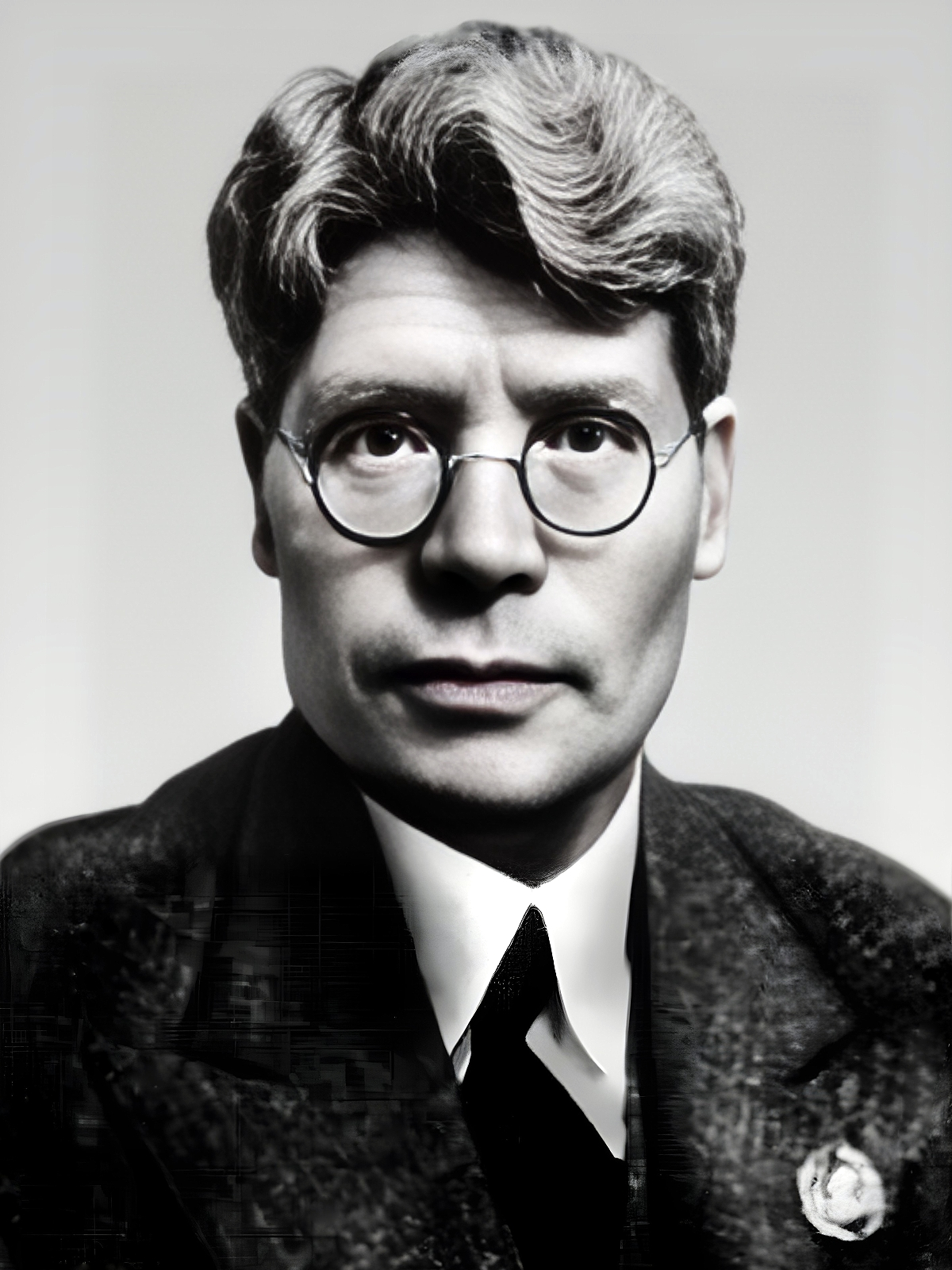
Ivan Gubkin, petroleum geologist particularly interested the region between the Volga and the Urals.

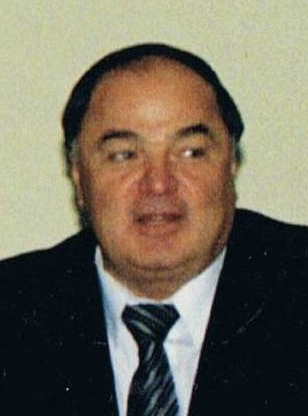
Hazret Sovmen, the second president of the Republic of Adygea, Russia, having succeeded Aslan Dzharimov at the post.

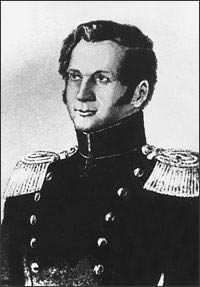
Pavel Anosov, Russian mining engineer, a metallurgical scientist, governor of Tomsk and a General-Major.

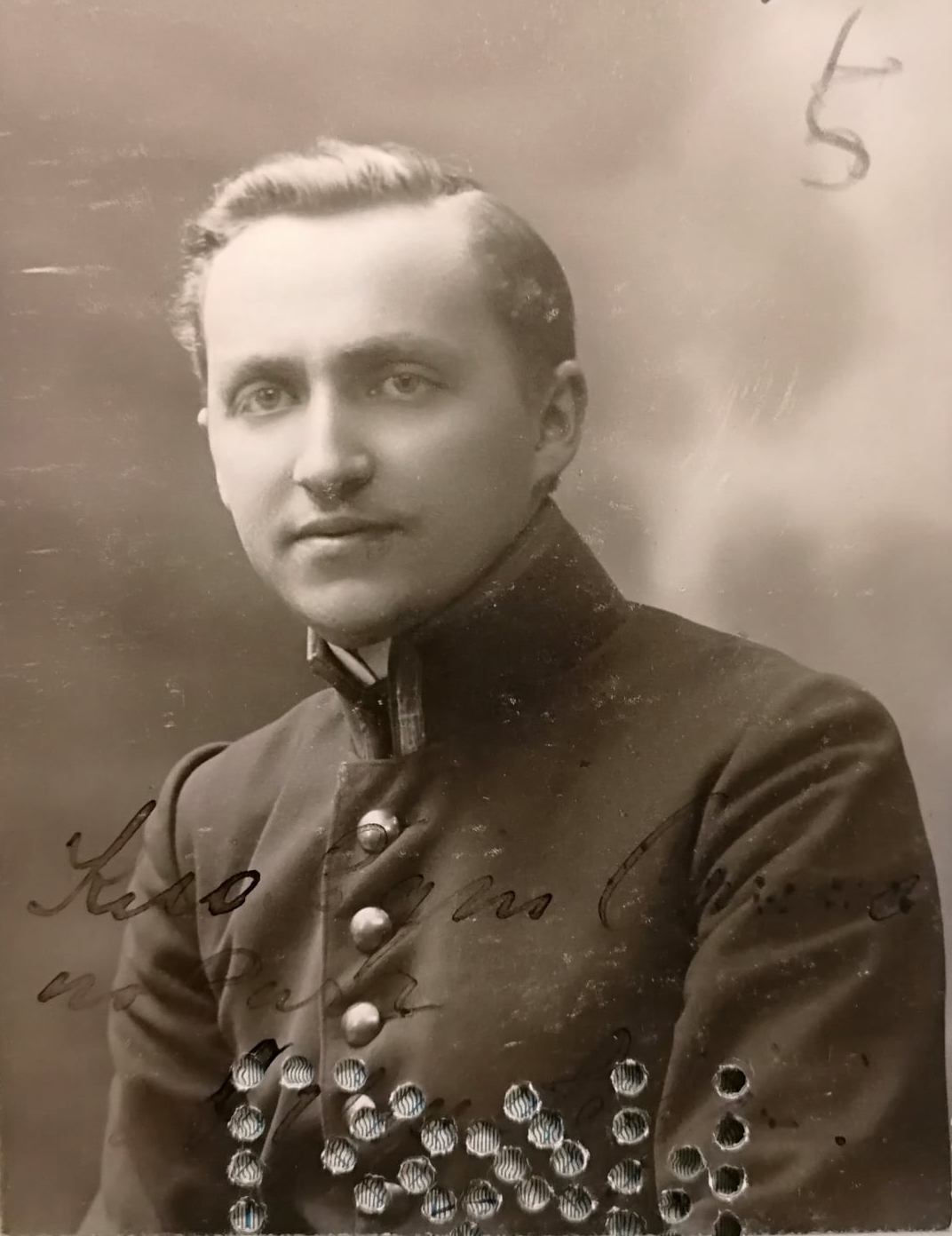
Klaudzi Duzh-Dusheuski, Belarusian civil engineer, architect, diplomat and journalist.

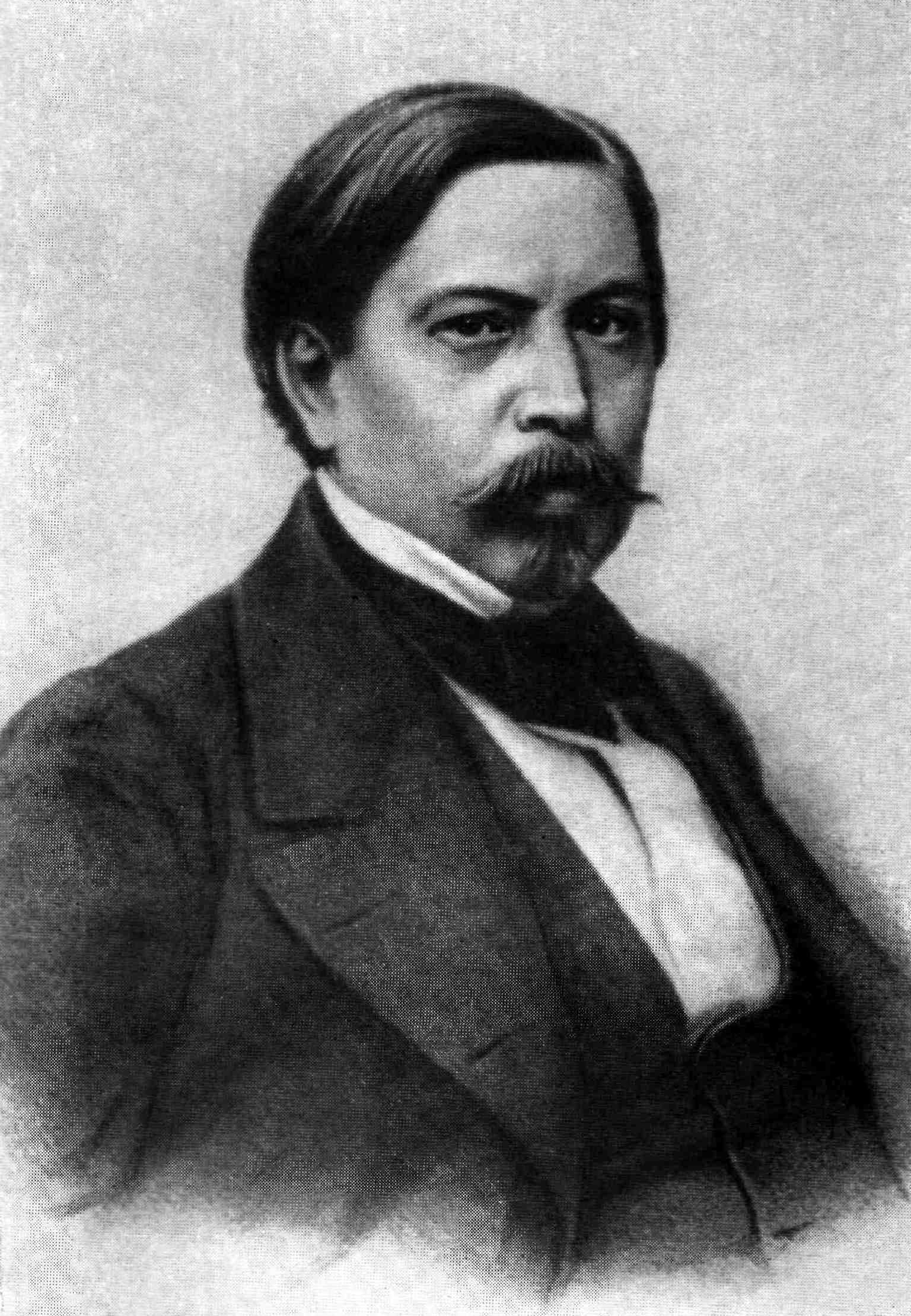
Pavel Annenkov, significant Russian Empire literary critic and memoirist.

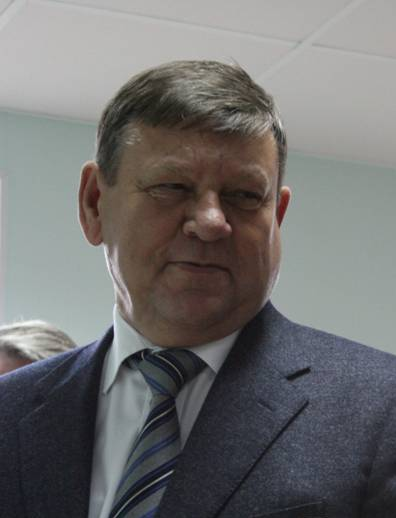
Valery Serdyukov, Russian politician who served as governor of Leningrad Oblast in Russia (1998–2012).

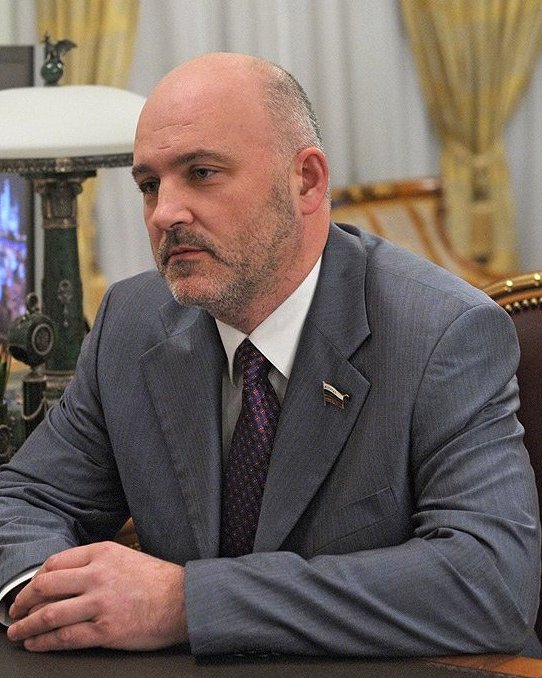
Konstantin Ilkovsky, Russian politician and Governor of Zabaykalsky Krai between 2013 and 17 February 2016.

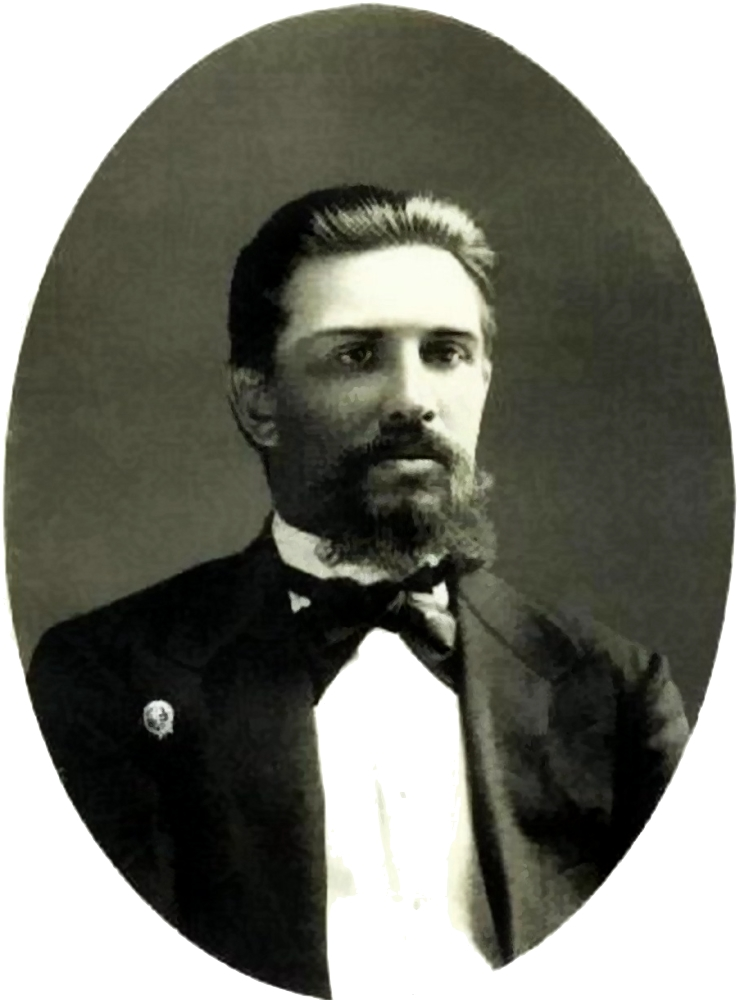
Ivan Mushketov, Russian geologist, tectonist, explorer, and geographer.

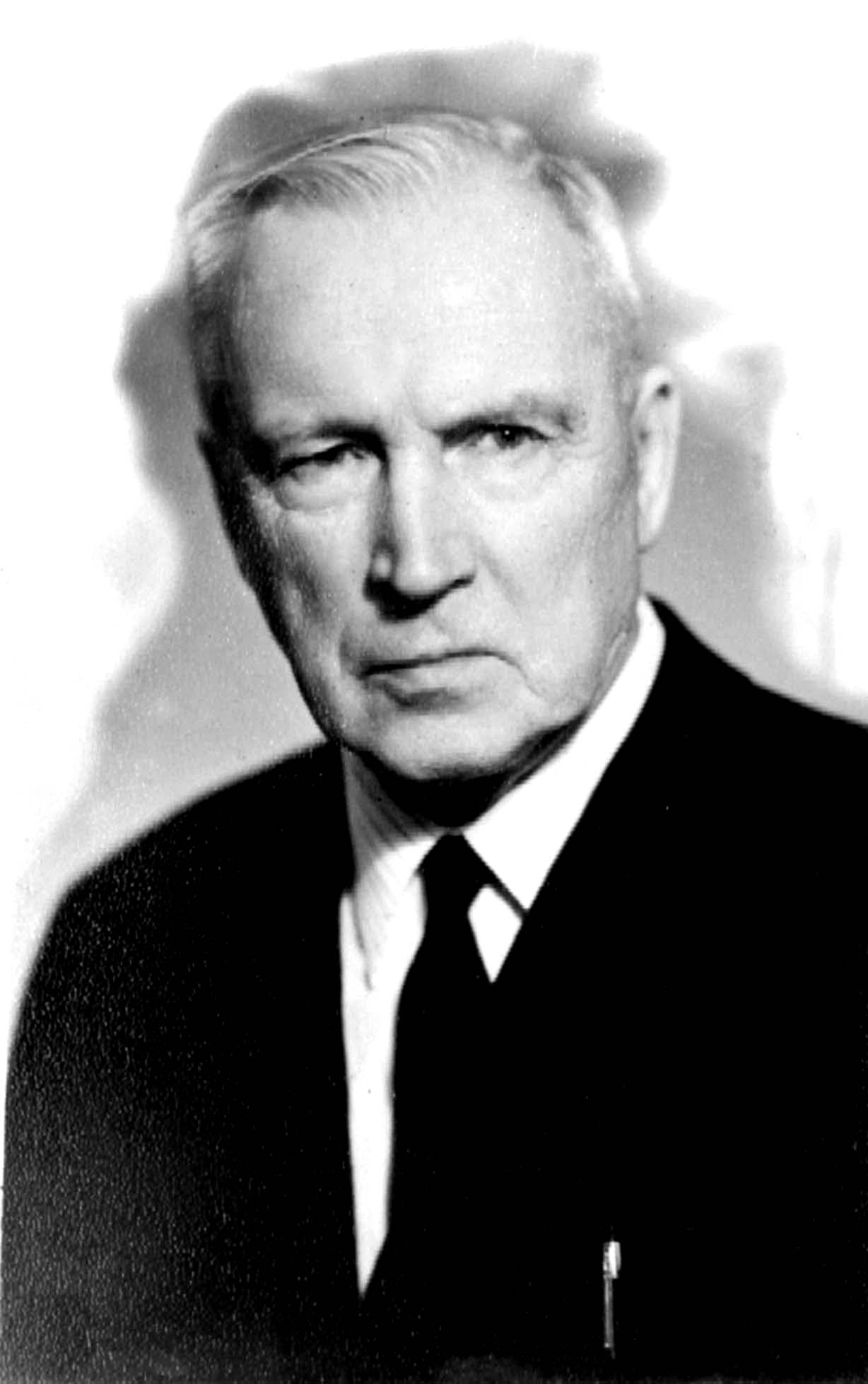
Nikolai Kudryavtsev, Soviet Russian petroleum geologist. Founding father of modern abiogenic theory for origin of petroleum.

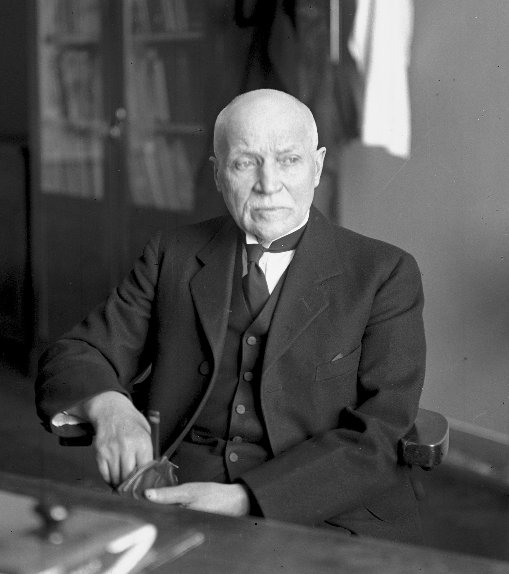
Karol Bohdanowicz, Polish geologist, an expert in mining geology and physical geography.

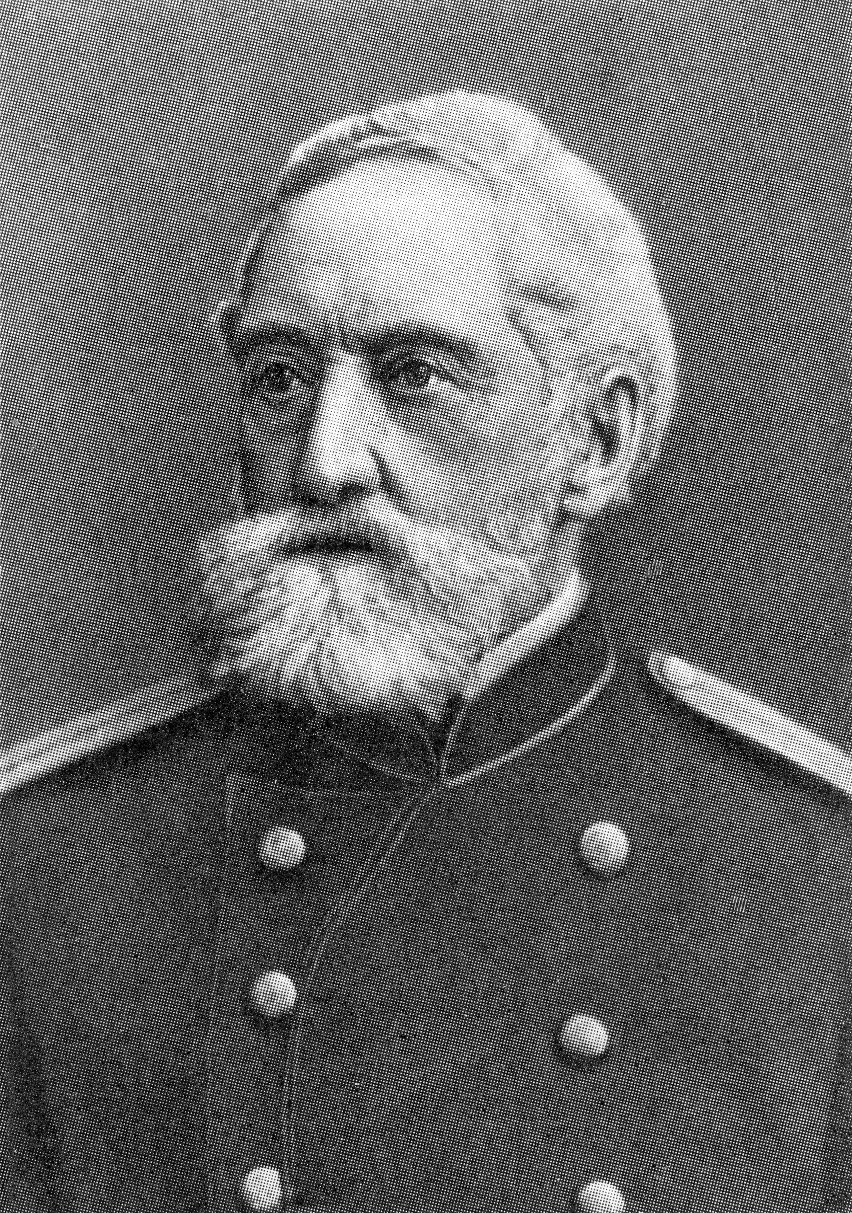
Gregor von Helmersen, Baltic German geologist.

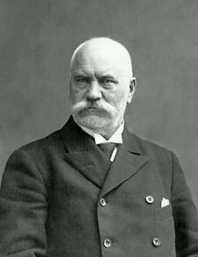
Ivan Pokrovsky, podporuchik of Imperial Russian Army, provincial secretary, entrepreneur, a deputy of Chelyabinsk City Duma.

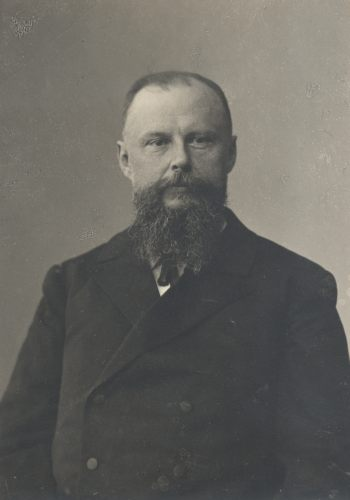
Grigori Levitski, Russian astronomer.

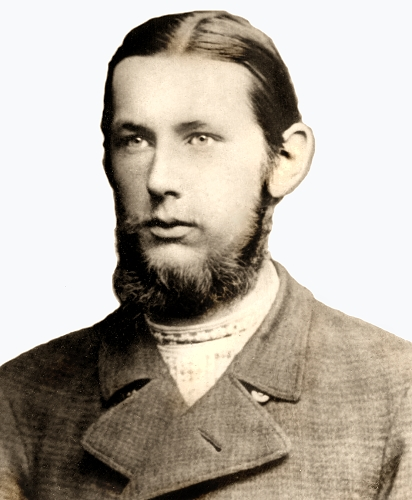
Nikolay Pogrebov, Russian and Soviet hydrogeologist and an engineering geologist.

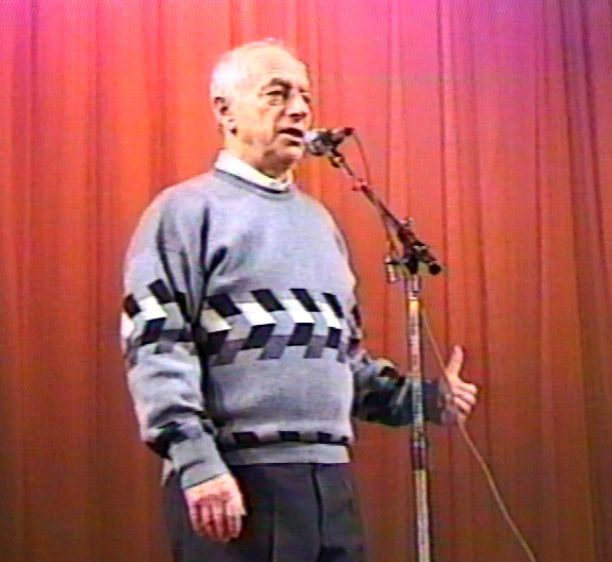
Alexander Gorodnitsky, Soviet and Russian Jewish bard and poet.
