= Ivan Pokrovsky =

Politician

Ivan Pokrovsky Russian: Иван Покровский
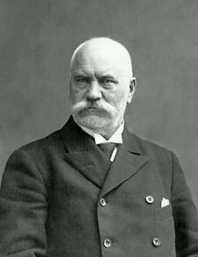
- in 1913

Deputy of the Third Imperial Duma
- In office 1 November 1907 – 9 June 1912
- Monarch: Nicholas II

Personal details
- Born: Ivan Kornil'yevich Pokrovsky; 1845 Chelyabinsk, Russian Empire
- Died: after 1912
- Party: Constitutional Democratic Party

Ivan Kornil'yevich Pokrovsky (known in the Duma as Pokrovsky 1st; Russian: Иван Корнильевич Покровский; 1845, Chelyabinsk — after 1912) was a podporuchik of Imperial Russian Army, provincial secretary, entrepreneur, a deputy of Chelyabinsk City Duma, a party "agent" of the Constitutional Democratic Party in Chelyabinsk and a deputy of the Third Imperial Duma from 1907 to 1912. He also lived and worked in Belgium; soon after, he owned gold mines in the Urals and was a co-owner of a distillery and a sugar factory. His brother, Vladimir (Russian: Владимир), was the mayor of Chelyabinsk.

== Literature ==
- Покровский Иван Корнильевич (in Russian) // Государственная дума Российской империи: 1906—1917 / Б. Ю. Иванов, А. А. Комзолова, И. С. Ряховская. — Москва: РОССПЭН, 2008. — P. 466. — 735 p. — ISBN 978-5-8243-1031-3.
- Покровскій (in Russian) // Члены Государственной Думы (портреты и биографии). Третий созыв. 1907—1912 гг. / Сост. М. М. Боиович. — М., 1913. — P. 209. — 526 p. (in Russian)
- Боже В. С. Покровский Иван Корнильевич (in Russian) // Челябинск: Энциклопедия / Составители: В. С. Боже, В. А. Черноземцев. — Изд. испр. и доп. — Челябинск: Каменный пояс, 2001. — P. 635. — 1112 p. — ISBN 5-88771-026-8.
