= Petr Shevyrev =

Petr Yakovlevich Shevyrev
- Пётр Яковлевич Шевырёв
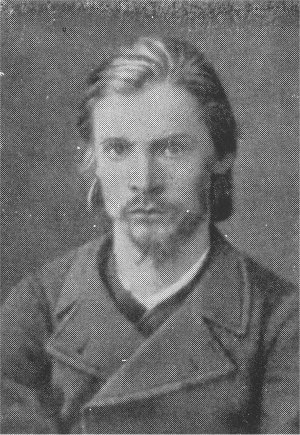
- Born: June 23/July 5, 1863; Kharkov, Russian Empire
- Died: May 8/May 20, 1887 (aged 23); Shlisselburg, Russian Empire
- Occupation: Revolutionary

Pyotr Yakovlevich Shevyryov (Russian: Пётр Я́ковлевич Шевырёв; June 23 [July 5], 1863 – May 8 [May 20], 1887) was a Russian revolutionary, member of Narodnaya Volya.

In 1883, Shevyrev enrolled in the University of Kharkiv and later transferred to St.Petersburg University. In the winter of 1885—1886, he organized an illegal club called "Student Union" (Союз землячеств, or Soyuz zemlyachestv). In the late 1886, Shevyrev and Aleksandr Ulyanov created the "Terrorist Faction" of Narodnaya Volya, which would be responsible for devising the attempted assassination of Alexander III on March 1, 1887. In February 1887, Shevyrev left for the Crimea due to his tuberculosis.

Shevyrev was arrested in Yalta on March 7. On April 19, at St. Petersburg, he was sentenced to death by hanging during the Pervomartovtsi trial. He was executed at the fortress of Shlisselburg some two weeks later.
