= Index of articles related to the Russian Revolution and Civil War =

An index of articles related to the Russian Revolution and the Russian Civil War period (1905–1922). It covers articles on topics, events, and persons related to the revolutionary era, from the 1905 Russian Revolution until the end of the Russian Civil War. The See also section includes other lists related to Revolutionary Russia and the Soviet Union, including Bibliography of the Russian Revolution and Civil War and Outline of the Red Terror (Russia).

== 0–9 ==
- 1917 Russian Constituent Assembly election
- 1905 Russian Revolution
- 26 Baku Commissars

Return to Table of Contents

== A ==
- Abdication of Nicholas II
- Alexandrovich, Michael
- Allied intervention in the Russian Civil War
- All-Russian Central Executive Committee of the Soviets of Workers' and Soldiers' Deputies
- All-Russian Congress of Soviets
- All-Russian Congress of Soviets of Workers' and Soldiers' Deputies
  - All-Russian Central Executive Committee of the Soviets of Workers' and Soldiers' Deputies
  - First All-Russian Congress of Soviets of Workers' and Soldiers' Deputies
  - Second All-Russian Congress of Soviets of Workers' and Soldiers' Deputies
  - Third All-Russian Congress of Workers', Soldiers' and Peasants Deputies' Soviets
- All-Russian Executive Committee of the Union of Railwaymen
- All-Russian Council for Workers' Control
- All-Russian Democratic Conference
- American Expeditionary Force, North Russia
- American Expeditionary Force, Siberia
- Andreyeva, Maria Fyodorovna
- April Crisis
- April Theses
- Armand, Inessa
- Armed Forces of South Russia
- Armenian Soviet Socialist Republic
- Avksentiev, Nikolai
- Axelrod, Pavel
- Azef, Yevno
- Azerbaijan Soviet Socialist Republic

Return to Table of Contents

== B ==
- Basmachi movement
- Battle for the Donbass (1919)
- Battle of Tsaritsyn
- Bloody Sunday (1905)
- Blumkin, Yakov
- Bogdanov, Alexander
- Bolsheviks
- Bolshevization of the Soviets
- Bourgeoisie
- Bukharin, Nikolai
- Bulygin, Alexander
- Bureau of the Central Committee of the Russian Communist Party (bolsheviks)
- Byelorussian Soviet Socialist Republic

Return to Table of Contents

== C ==
- Canadian Siberian Expeditionary Force
- Central Committee of the Baltic Fleet
- Central Executive Committee of the Navy
- Centrocaspian Dictatorship
- Cheka
- Chernov, Viktor
- Chernyshevsky, Nikolay
- Committee for the Salvation of the Homeland and Revolution
- Constitutional Democratic Party (Note: Party members were called Kadets or Cadets from the abbreviation K-D.)
- Congress of the Communist Party of the Soviet Union
  - 6th Congress of the Russian Social Democratic Labour Party (Bolsheviks) (1917)
  - 7th Congress of the Russian Communist Party (Bolsheviks) (1918)
  - 8th Congress of the Russian Communist Party (Bolsheviks) (1919)
  - 9th Congress of the Russian Communist Party (Bolsheviks) (1920)
  - 10th Congress of the Russian Communist Party (Bolsheviks) (1921)
  - 11th Congress of the Russian Communist Party (Bolsheviks) (1922)
- Committee of Members of the Constituent Assembly
- Communist International
  - Second International
- Communist Manifesto, The
- Communist party
- Communist symbolism
- Council of Labor and Defense
- Council of People's Commissars
- Culture of the Soviet Union
- Czechoslovak Legion

Return to Table of Contents

== D ==
- Declaration of the Rights of the Peoples of Russia
- Decree on Land
- Decree on Peace
- Democratic centralism
- Denikin, Anton
- Dictatorship of the proletariat
- Directorate (Russia)
- Dual power
- Duma
- Dzerzhinsky, Felix

Return to Table of Contents

== E ==
- Early life of Vladimir Lenin
- Eastern Front of the Russian Civil War
- Eisenstein, Sergei
- Engels, Friedrich
- Evacuation of Novorossiysk (1920)
- Evacuation of the Crimea (1920)
- Execution of the Romanov family
- Executive Committee of the Petrograd Soviet (Note: Also known as Ispolkom.)

Return to Table of Contents

== F ==
- Far Eastern Front in the Russian Civil War
- February Revolution

Return to Table of Contents

== G ==
- General Jewish Labour Bund
- Gapon, Georgy
- Georgian Soviet Socialist Republic
- Golitsyn, Nikolai
- Goremykin, Ivan
- Gorky, Maxim
- Green armies
- Guchkov, Alexander

Return to Table of Contents

== H ==
- Hammer and sickle
- Harbin Soviet
- House of Romanov

Return to Table of Contents

== I ==
- Ice March
- Imperialism, the Highest Stage of Capitalism
- Internationale
- International Workingmen's Association
- Ispolkom (Note: Also known as The Executive Committee of the Petrograd Soviet.)

Return to Table of Contents]

== J ==
- Jailbirds of Kerensky
- Japanese intervention in Siberia
- Joseph Stalin in the Russian Revolution, Russian Civil War, and Polish–Soviet War
- July Days
- Junker mutiny

Return to Table of Contents

== K ==
- Kaledin, Alexey
- Kalinin, Mikhail
- Kamenev, Lev
- Kerensky, Alexander
- Kerensky–Krasnov uprising
- Khabalov, Sergey Semyonovich
- Kyiv or Kiev
- Kiev Arsenal January Uprising
- Kiev Bolshevik Uprising
- Kiev Offensive (1920)
- Kokovtsov, Vladimir
- Kolchak, Alexander
- Kornilov affair
- Kornilov, Lavr
- Krestinsky, Nikolay
- Kronstadt
- Kronstadt mutinies
- Kronstadt rebellion
- Krupskaya, Nadezhda
- Kuban Offensive
- Kulak

Return to Table of Contents

== L ==
- Latvian Riflemen
- League of Struggle for the Emancipation of the Working Class
- Left Socialist-Revolutionaries
- Left SR uprising
- Left-wing uprisings against the Bolsheviks
- Lenin, Vladimir
  - Early life of Vladimir Lenin
  - Government of Vladimir Lenin
  - Revolutionary activity of Vladimir Lenin
- Leningrad
- Leninism
- Lenin's Hanging Order
- Lessons of October
- Liber, Mikhail
- Lunacharsky, Anatoly
- Lvov, Georgy

Return to Table of Contents

== M ==
- Makhno, Nestor
- Malinovsky, Roman
- Martov, Julius
- Marxism
- Marxism–Leninism
- Masanchi, Magaza
- Materialism and Empirio-criticism
- Mayakovsky, Vladimir
- Mensheviks
- Military Revolutionary Committee
- Milyukov, Pavel
- Mossovet (Moscow Soviet of People's Deputies)
- Moscow
- Moscow Bolshevik Uprising
- Moscow State Conference
- Muromtsev, Sergey

Return to Table of Contents

== N ==
- Narodnaya Volya (Note: Commonly known as the "People's Will")
- Nicholas II of Russia
- Nikolaevich, Alexei
- Nikolaevich, Nicholas
- Nogin, Viktor
- North Russia intervention

Return to Table of Contents

== O ==
- October Manifesto
- Octoberists
- October Revolution
- Okhrana
- Orgburo (Note: Also known as the Organisational Bureau.)

Return to Table of Contents

== P ==
- Parvus, Alexander
- People's Will
- Pepelyayev, Anatoly
- Permanent revolution
- Petrograd
- Petrograd Military Revolutionary Committee
- Petrograd Soviet
- Plehve, Vyacheslav
- Plekhanov, Georgi
- Pogroms of the Russian Civil War
- Polish–Soviet War
- Politburo of the Communist Party of the Soviet Union
- Political Centre (Russia)
- Popular Socialists (Russia)
- Pravda
- Progressive Bloc (Russia)
- Pro-independence movements in the Russian Civil War
- Proletarian revolution
- Proletariat
- Provisional All-Russian Government
- Provisional Committee of the State Duma
- Provisional Priamurye Government
- Provisional Siberian Government (Vladivostok)
- Purishkevich, Vladimir
- Pyatakov, Georgy

Return to Table of Contents

== R ==
- Rada
- Rasputin, Grigori
- Red Army
- Red Guards
- Red Terror
- Reed, John
- Revolt of the Czechoslovak Legion
- Revolutionary Insurrectionary Army of Ukraine (Note: Also known as the "Black Army" or "Makhnovshchyna".)
- Revolutions of 1917–1923
- Revolutionary activity of Vladimir Lenin
- Revolutionary socialism
- Revolutionary tribunal (Russia)
- Romanian military intervention in Bessarabia
- Romanov, Michael Alexandrovich
- Romanov, Nikolai Alexandrovich
- Russian Civil War
- Russian Constituent Assembly
- Russian famine of 1921–22
- Russian Provisional Government (Note: Government in power from the February Revolution until the October Revolution.)
- Russian Revolution
- Russian Social Democratic Labour Party
- Russian Social Democratic Labour Party (of Internationalists)
- Russian Soviet Federative Socialist Republic
- Ruzsky, Nikolai

Return to Table of Contents

== S ==
- Saint Petersburg (Note: Later Petrograd, then Leningrad.)
- Saint Petersburg Soviet
- St. Petersburg Workers' Organisation
- Second International
- Secretariat of the Communist Party of the Soviet Union
- Semyonov, Grigory Mikhaylovich
- Siberian intervention
- Shulgin, Vasily
- Socialist Revolutionary Party
- Sokolnikov, Grigori
- Southern Front of the Russian Civil War
- Soviet
- Soviet calendar
- Soviet Union
- Soviet westward offensive of 1918–19
- Sovnarkom
- SR Combat Organization
- Starving March
- Stasova, Elena
- State and Revolution, The
- State Duma (Russian Empire)
  - April 1906 Russian legislative election
  - January 1907 Russian legislative election
  - October 1907 Russian legislative election
  - November 1912 Russian legislative election
- Stolypin, Pyotr
- Stürmer, Boris
- Sverdlov, Yakov
- Sviatopolk-Mirsky, Pyotr

Return to Table of Contents

== T ==
- Ten Days That Shook the World
- Treaty of Brest-Litovsk
- Treaty on the Creation of the USSR
- Trepov, Alexander
- Trepov, Dmitri Feodorovich
- Trial of the Socialist Revolutionaries
- Trotsky, Leon
- Trotskyism
- Trubetskoy, Sergei Petrovich
- Trudoviks
- Tsaritsyn (Note: Now known as Volgograd (1961–present), formerly known as Stalingrad (1925-1961).)
- Tsereteli, Irakli
- Tsvetaeva, Marina
- Turkestan Front
- Two Tactics of Social Democracy in the Democratic Revolution

Return to Table of Contents

== U ==
- Ukrainian People's Republic
- Ukrainian Socialist-Revolutionary Party
- Ukrainian Soviet Socialist Republic
- Ulyanov, Aleksandr
- Union of October 17 (Note: Also known as the Octoberists.)
- Union of Socialists-Revolutionaries Maximalists
- Ural Army

Return to Table of Contents

== V ==
- Vanguardism
- Vikzhel
- Volunteer Army
- Vyborg Manifesto

Return to Table of Contents

== W ==
- War communism
- What Is to Be Done?
- White Army
- White émigré
- White movement
- White Terror
- Witte, Sergei
- Women in the Russian Revolution
- World revolution
- World War I
- Wrangel's fleet
- Wrangel, Pyotr

Return to Table of Contents

== Y ==
- Yakut revolt
- Yudenich, Nikolai

Return to Table of Contents

== Z ==
- Zemstvo
- Zenzinov, Vladimir
- Zinoviev, Grigory
- Zhordania, Noe

Return to Table of Contents

== See also ==
- Bibliography of the Russian Revolution and Civil War
- Timeline of Russian history
- Timeline of the Russian Civil War

Return to Table of Contents
