= Revolutionary activity of Vladimir Lenin =

Vladimir Lenin
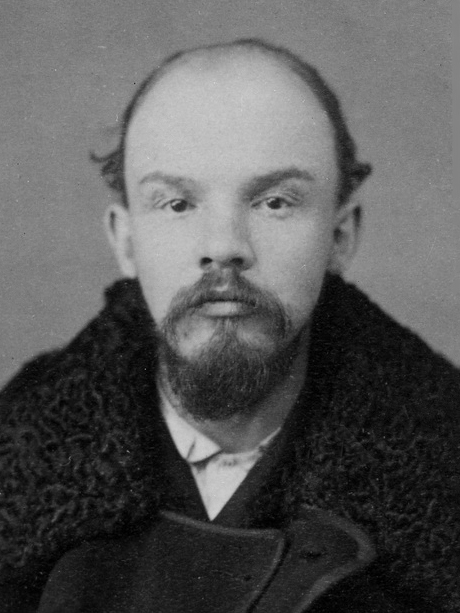
- Lenin in a police photograph from December 1895
- Born: Vladimir Ilyich Ulyanov (Владимир Ильич Ульянов); 22 April 1870; Simbirsk, Russian Empire
- Died: 21 January 1924 (aged 53); Gorki, Russian SFSR, Soviet Union
- Resting place: Lenin's Mausoleum, Moscow, Russian Federation
- Occupations: Communist revolutionary; politician; socio-political theorist

The Russian communist revolutionary and politician Vladimir Lenin began his active revolutionary activity in 1893, and continued till assuming power in the Russian Revolution of 1917. Following on from his early life, during which he had become devoted to the cause of revolution against the Tsarist regime in the Russian Empire and converted to Marxism, Lenin moved to St. Petersburg. There he joined a revolutionary cell, and became a vocal advocate for Marxism within the revolutionary socialist movement. Entering a relationship with fellow Marxist Nadezhda Krupskaya, he toured Western Europe to build ties with other Russian revolutionary emigres and learn more about the international Marxist movement. Upon returning to Russia, he was arrested for sedition in 1895 and exiled to Shushenskoye in the Minusinsky District of eastern Siberia for three years. There, he devoted his time to translating and writing revolutionary texts, marrying Krupskaya in July 1898.

His exile over, in 1900 he moved to Western Europe, where he joined the editorial board of Iskra, the publication of the Marxist Russian Social Democratic Labour Party (RSDLP). Iskra's base was moved from Munich to London and then to Geneva, each time accompanied by Lenin. At the party's second congress, held in London in 1903, a major schism erupted between Lenin and his supporters (the Bolsheviks) and Julius Martov and his supporters (the Mensheviks); Lenin emphasised a strongly centralised party controlled largely by the leadership, whereas Martov accepted a wider party with more independence of thought. Lenin returned to Russia briefly during the Revolution of 1905, but fled again when the Tsarist authorities defeated the revolutionary forces and cracked down on dissent.

Living in Paris and then Kraków, he focused on internal conflict within the Marxist movement, opposing the ideas of the Mensheviks and Alexander Bogdanov; he penned Materialism and Empirio-criticism to counter his critics. During the First World War, he relocated to Switzerland, where he argued that socialists should work toward converting that "imperialist war" into a continent-wide "civil war" in which the proletariat could overthrow the bourgeoisie. He summarised his thought in the book Imperialism, the Highest Stage of Capitalism and also re-interpreted Marxism on the basis of reading Hegelian philosophy. When the February Revolution of 1917 led to the abdication of the Tsar and the development of the Russian Provisional Government, Lenin returned to St. Petersburg, now called Petrograd. There, he urged the Bolsheviks to oppose the new government, and support proletariat revolution.

== Saint Petersburg and foreign visits: 1893–1895 ==
In autumn 1893, Vladimir moved to Saint Petersburg, taking up residence in a Sergievsky Street flat in the Liteiny district, before moving to 7 Kazachy Alley, near the Haymarket. Employed as a lawyer's assistant, he joined a revolutionary cell run by S.I. Radchenko, whose members were primarily students from the city's Technological Institute. Like Vladimir, they were Marxists, and called themselves the "Social Democrats" after the Marxist Social Democratic Party of Germany. Impressed by his extensive knowledge, they welcomed him and he soon became a senior member of the group. Championing Marxist thought among the revolutionary socialist movement, in January 1894 he publicly debated with Marxist Theorist Vasily Vorontsov at a clandestine meeting, attracting the attention of police spies. Intent on building Marxism in Russia, Vladimir contacted Petr Berngardovich Struve, a wealthy sympathizer whom he hoped could aid in the publication of literature, encouraged the foundation of revolutionary cells in Russia's industrial centres, and befriended Russian Jewish Marxist Julius Martov.

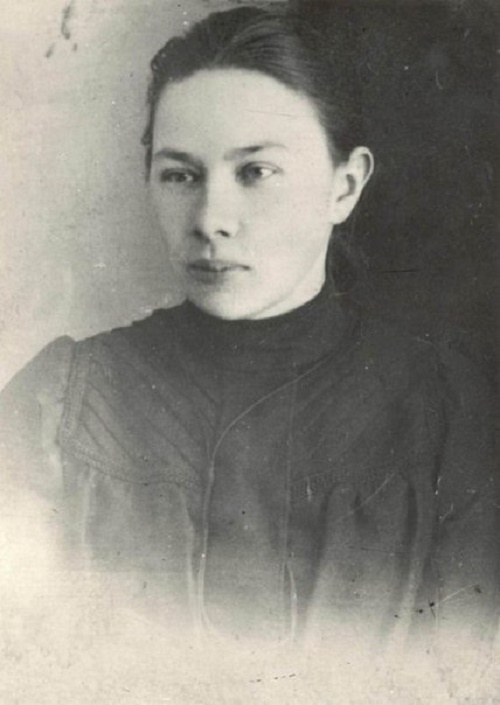
Lenin's lover Nadya

Vladimir entered into a relationship with fellow Marxist and schoolteacher Nadezhda "Nadya" Krupskaya, who introduced him to socialist proletariat. By autumn 1894, Vladimir was leading a workers' circle who met for two hours on a Sunday; known by the pseudonym Nikolai Petrovich, they affectionately referred to him as starik (old man). He was meticulous in covering his tracks, knowing that police spies were trying to infiltrate the revolutionary movement. He wrote his first political tract, What the "Friends of the People" Are and How They Fight the Social-Democrats; based largely on his experiences in Samara, around 200 copies were illegally printed.

Although Lenin was influenced by agrarian-socialist Pëtr Tkachëvi, he and the Social-Democrats clashed with the Socialist–Revolutionary Party (SR), who were inspired by the defunct People's Freedom Party. Advocating a Narodnik agrarian-socialist platform, the SR emphasised the revolutionary role of the peasant, who in 1881 numbered 75 million, in contrast to the 1 million urban proletariat in Russia. In contrast, the Marxists believed that the peasant class' primary motivation was to own their land, and that they were capitalists; instead, they saw the proletariat as the revolutionary force to advance socialism.

He hoped that connections could be cemented between his Social-Democrats and the Emancipation of Labour group; an organisation founded in Geneva, Switzerland by Georgi Plekhanov and other Russian Marxist emigres in 1883. Vladimir and E.I. Sponti were selected to travel to Switzerland to meet with Plekhanov, who was generally supportive but criticised the Social-Democrats for ignoring the bourgeoisie's role in the anti-Tsarist revolution. Traveling to Zurich, Vladimir befriended Pavel Axelrod, another member of Emancipation of Labour. Proceeding to Paris, France, Vladimir met Paul Lafargue and researched the Paris Commune of 1871, which he saw as an early prototype for a proletarian government. Financed by his mother, he stayed in a Swiss health spa before traveling to Berlin, Germany, where he studied for six weeks at the Staatsbibliothek and met Wilhelm Liebknecht. Returning to Russia with a stash of illegal revolutionary literature, he traveled to various cities, aware that he was being monitored by the police, and distributed literature to striking workers in Saint Petersburg. Involved in producing a news sheet, The Workers' Cause, he was among 40 activists arrested on the night before the first issue's publication and charged with sedition.

== Siberian exile: 1895–1900 ==
Imprisoned at the House of Preliminary Detention in Shpalernaya Street, Vladimir was refused legal representation, so denied all charges. His family helped him, but he was refused bail, remaining imprisoned for a year before sentencing. Fellow revolutionaries smuggled messages to him, while he devised a code for playing chess with the neighbouring inmate. Spending much time writing, he focused on the revolutionary potential of the working-class; believing that the rise of industrial capitalism had led large numbers of peasants to move to the cities, he argued that they became proletariat and gained class consciousness, which would lead them to violently overthrow the aristocracy and bourgeoisie. By July 1896 he had finished Draft and Explanation of A Programme for the Social Democratic Party and had commenced work on his book The Development of Capitalism in Russia.

Vladimir was sentenced without trial to 3 years exile in eastern Siberia. Given a few days in Saint Petersburg in February 1897 to put his affairs in order, he met with fellow revolutionaries; the Social-Democrats had been renamed the League of Struggle for the Emancipation of the Working Class, and with many of its leading intelligentsia imprisoned, workers had taken over many senior positions, a move that caused rifts but which gained Vladimir's cautious support. In 1896–97, strikes hit Saint Petersburg, aided by the Marxists; believing his predictions to be coming true, Vladimir was unhappy at having to abandon the movement. The Russian government made use of a large network of prison camps and areas of exile on the verges of its empire to deal with dissidents and criminals; by 1897 there were 300,000 Russian citizens in this system, and Vladimir was now one of them. Permitted to make his own way there, the journey took 11 weeks, for much of which he was accompanied by his mother and sisters. Considered a minor threat, Vladimir was exiled to Shushenskoye in the Minusinsky District, a settlement that Vladimir described as "not a bad place". Renting a room in a peasant's hut, he remained under police surveillance, but corresponded with other subversives, many of whom visited him, and also went on trips to hunt duck and snipe and to swim in the Yenisei River.

In May 1898, Nadya joined him in exile, having been arrested in August 1896 for organizing a strike. Although initially posted to Ufa, she convinced the authorities to move her to Shushenskoye, claiming that she and Vladimir were engaged; they married in a church on 10 July 1898. Settling into a family life with Nadya's mother Elizaveta Vasilyevna, the couple translated Sidney and Beatrice Webb's The History of Trade Unionism (1894) into Russian, a job obtained for them by Struve. Keen to keep abreast of the developments in German Marxism – where there had been an ideological split, with revisionists like Eduard Bernstein advocating a peaceful, electoral path to socialism – Vladimir remained devoted to violent revolution, attacking revisionist arguments in A Protest by Russian Social-Democrats. He was also critical of the "Economists", members of the Social-Democratic movement who campaigned for economic reforms to improve workers' conditions rather than fighting for socio-political revolution. Vladimir also finished The Development of Capitalism in Russia (1899), his longest book to date, which offered a well-researched and polemical attack on the Social-Revolutionaries and promoting a Marxist analysis of Russian economic development. Published under the pseudonym of "Vladimir Ilin", it would be described by biographer Robert Service as "a tour de force", but received predominantly poor reviews upon publication.

== Munich, London and Geneva: 1900–1905 ==
His exile over, Vladimir was banned from Saint Petersburg, instead settling in Pskov, a small town two hours' train ride from the capital, in February 1900. His wife, who had not served the entirety of her sentence, remained in exile in Ufa, where she fell ill. Intent on founding a newspaper, Vladimir and Struve raised money for the publication of Iskra (The Spark), a new organ of the Russian Marxist movement, now calling itself the Russian Social Democratic Labour Party (RSDLP). After visiting his wife, on 29 July 1900, Vladimir left Russia for Western Europe. In Switzerland and Germany, he met with Axelrod, Plekhanov and Potresov, and lectured on the Russian situation. On 24 August 1900, a conference of Russian Marxists was held in the Swiss town of Corsier to discuss Iskra, but both Vladimir and Potresov were shocked at Plekhanov's controlling nature and antisemitism. It was agreed that the paper would be produced in Munich, where Vladimir moved in September 1900. The first issue was printed on Christmas Eve, and contained an article written by Vladimir decrying European intervention in the Boxer Rebellion. A second RSDLP publication, Zarya, appeared in March 1901, and would run for four issues, but Iskra was far more successful, being smuggled into Russia illegally, becoming the most successful Russian underground publication for 50 years. It contained contributions from such figures as the Polish Rosa Luxemburg, the Czech-German Karl Kautsky, and a young Ukrainian Marxist, Leon Trotsky, who became a regular contributor from the autumn of 1902.

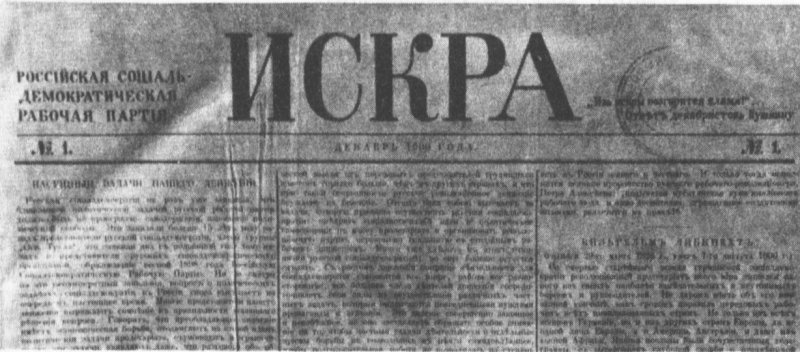
The first issue of Iskra ("Spark"), official organ of the Russian Social Democratic Labour Party. Edited by Lenin from his base in Geneva, Switzerland, copies would be smuggled into Russia, where it would prove successful in winning support for the Marxist revolutionary cause.

Vladimir adopted the nom de guerre of "Lenin" in December 1901, possibly taking the River Lena as a basis, thereby imitating the manner in which Plekhanov had adopted the pseudonym of "Volgin" after the River Volga. In 1902, he published a political pamphlet entitled What Is to Be Done? – named after Chernychevsky's novel – under this pseudonym. His most influential publication to date, it dealt with Lenin's thoughts on the need for a vanguard party to lead the working-class to revolution; it expressed criticism of those in the party who wanted to follow along in the wave of the revolution. When his wife finished her sentence, she joined him in Munich; she became his personal secretary, aiding the production of Iskra. Together, they continued their political agitation, with Lenin writing further articles for Iskra and drafting the program for the RSDLP, attacking ideological dissenters and external critics, particularly the SR. Despite remaining an orthodox Marxist, he had begun to accept the Social Revolutionary Party's views on the revolutionary power of the Russian peasantry, penning a pamphlet in 1903 entitled To the Village Poor.

Realising that they were being monitored by the Bavarian police, Lenin and the newspaper's other editors agreed to relocate Iskra to London, Britain, with Lenin and his wife arriving in the city in April 1902, there renting a flat in St. Pancras. Although despising English cuisine, Lenin liked London, spending much time in the Reading Room of the British Museum. He lived in close proximity to the other editors, but disliked their communal mode of living, instead becoming good friends with Trotsky, who had arrived in the city. While in London, Lenin fell ill with erysipelas and was unable to take such a leading role on the Iskra editorial board; in his absence the board approved a measure that he disagreed with, that of moving back to Switzerland. Before relocating, Lenin holidayed in Brittany, France with his mother and sister.

In March 1902, the Organisational Committee for Congress had been set up, devoted to planning the 2nd RSDLP Congress, which was to be held in Brussels, Belgium in July. However, as the date neared, it was clear that Belgian police were monitoring it, and so the venue was changed to the Brotherhood Church in London. At the conference, a schism emerged between Lenin's supporters and those of Martov. In putting together a draft party platform, Martov argued that party members should be able to express themselves independently of the party leadership; Lenin disagreed, emphasising the need for a strong leadership with complete control. The matter was put to a vote, and Martov won by 28 to 22 votes. Arguments continued, and many of those who had supported Martov's position walked out in protest. This left Lenin's supporters in the majority, and Lenin termed them the "majoritarians" (bol'sheviki in Russian; thus Bolsheviks), and in response, Martov termed his followers the minoritarians (men'sheviki in Russian; thus Mensheviks). The Congress resulted in the adoption of a fixed party programme and rule, but had also resulted in a major schism.

With Lenin now based in Geneva, the arguments between Bolsheviks and Mensheviks continued after the conference. The Bolsheviks accused their rivals of being opportunists and reformists who lacked any discipline, while the Mensheviks accused Lenin of being a despot and autocrat, comparing him to Maximilien de Robespierre. When Plekhanov sided with Martov, Lenin flew into a rage and resigned from both the Iskra editorial board and the Party Council. In May 1904, he published One Step Forward, Two Steps Back, a booklet claiming that Martov's supporters had tricked him into this. The stress added to an illness, which at the time was probably diagnosed as neurasthenia, and to relive this, he went on a climbing holiday in the countryside in June. Some party members attempted to reunite the feuding factions, but this failed, and by the spring, all eight members of the Central Committee were Bolsheviks. In December, they founded a Bolshevik newspaper, Vperëd (Forward).

== Revolution and aftermath: 1905–1914 ==
"The uprising has begun. Force against Force. Street fighting is raging, barricades are being thrown up, rifles are cracking, guns are booming. Rivers of blood are flowing, the civil war for freedom is blazing up. Moscow and the South, the Caucasus and Poland are ready to join the proletariat of St. Petersburg. The slogan of the workers has become: Death or Freedom!"

— Lenin, 1905

In January 1905, the massacre of protesters that came to be known as Bloody Sunday took place in St. Petersburg, sparking the civil unrest known as the Revolution of 1905. In response to these events, Lenin urged Bolsheviks in the Empire to take a greater role in the unrest, encouraging violent insurrection against the Tsarist establishment, including police and the Black Hundreds. He also insisted that the Bolsheviks split completely with the Mensheviks, although many Bolsheviks, among them close colleagues like Gusev and Zemlyachka, disagreed with him. Thus, both groups were invited to the 3rd RSDLP Congress, held in London in April 1905; nevertheless, few Mensheviks attended, and Lenin used the Congress to reassert his dominance within the party. He also oversaw the formation of a new Bolshevik newspaper, Proletari (The Worker).

Lenin presented many of his ideas in the pamphlet Two Tactics of Social Democracy in the Democratic Revolution, published in August 1905. Here, he predicted that the liberal bourgeoisie would be sated by a constitutional monarchy and thus betray the revolution; instead he argued that the proletariat would have to build an alliance with the peasantry to overthrow the Tsarist regime and establish a republic which he called the "provisional revolutionary democratic dictatorship of the proletariat and the peasantry". He began to use a number of slogans – "armed insurrection", "mass terror", and "the expropriation of gentry land" – which were influenced by both the Russian agrarian-socialists and the Jacobins of the French Revolution. This shocked the Mensheviks, who believed that Lenin had departed from orthodox Marxism. From Geneva, Lenin continued to monitor the revolutionary situation in Russia, and met with the exiled Father Georgy Gapon, who had led the protest that was crushed in Bloody Sunday.

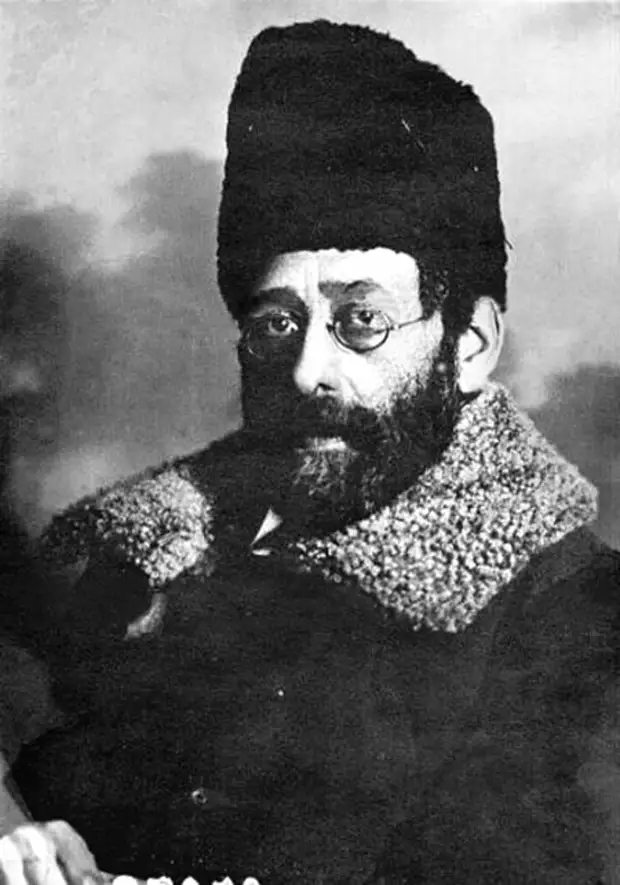
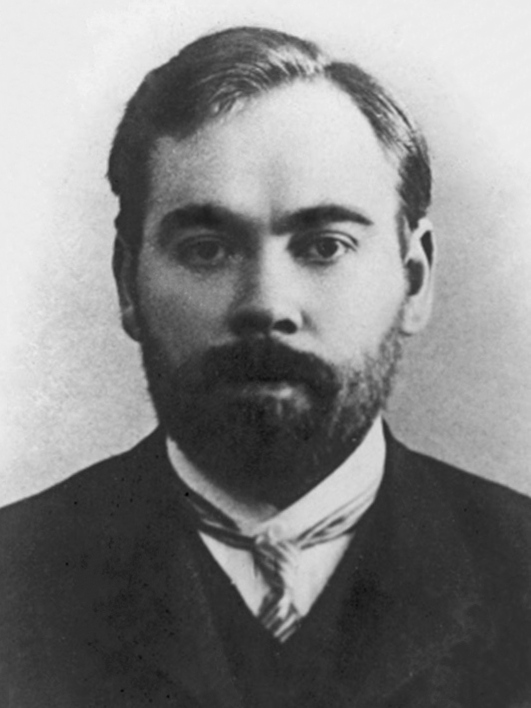
Lenin's factionalism led him to split with Julius Martov (left) and the Mensheviks, and then Alexander Bogdanov (right) within the Bolshevik faction

Lenin had not wanted to return to the Russian Empire, fearing arrest. He changed his opinion when Tsar Nicholas II accepted a series of liberal reforms in his October Manifesto, with Lenin believing that these would protect him from the Okhrana. Thus, Lenin and his wife returned to Russia incognito via Sweden and Finland, moving between different safe houses in St. Petersburg, from which he monitored events and wrote up many of his ideas on the progress of the revolution. He was invited to join the editorial board of Novaya Zhizn (New Life), a radical legal newspaper run by Maxim Gorky's wife M.F. Andreyeva, and used this as a vehicle to discuss issues facing the RSDLP. He encouraged the party to seek out a much wider membership, and also advocated the continual escalation of violent confrontation, believing both to be necessary for the revolution to succeed. However, after the armed Moscow Uprising failed, Lenin began to urge the party to stand in elections for the Duma, believing that this would raise the party's public profile. At a Bolshevik Congress in Tampere, Finland, Lenin first met young Bolshevik Joseph Stalin. He also changed his mind on the issue of the Mensheviks, and began calling for reconciliation between the party's two factions. Members of both groups met at the 4th Party Congress in Stockholm, Sweden in April 1906 where the Mensheviks condemned Lenin for supporting bank robberies and encouraging violence. The Congress resulted in the election of a new Central Committee comprising 7 Mensheviks and 3 Bolsheviks.

A Bolshevik Centre was set up in Kuokkala, Grand Duchy of Finland, which was then a semi-autonomous part of the Empire, before the 5th RSDLP Congress was held in London in May 1907, where the Bolsheviks regained dominance within the party. However, as the Tsarist government disbanded the Second Duma and the Okhrana cracked down on revolutionaries, Lenin decided to flee Finland for Sweden, undertaking much of the journey by foot. From there, he made it to Switzerland. Alexander Bogdanov and other prominent Bolsheviks decided to relocate the Bolshevik Centre to Paris, France; although Lenin disagreed, he moved to the city in December 1908. Lenin disliked Paris, lambasting it as "a foul hole", and sued a motorist who knocked him off his bike while there.

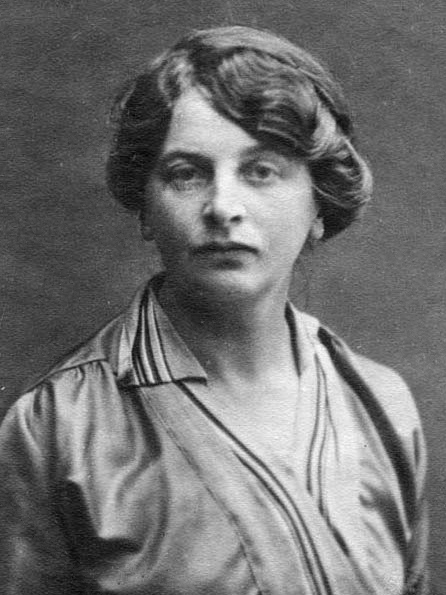
Inessa Armand, who may have had a relationship with Lenin

Here, Lenin revived his polemics against the Mensheviks, who objected to his advocacy of violent expropriations and thefts such as the 1907 Tiflis bank robbery, which the Bolsheviks were using to fund their activities. Lenin also became heavily critical of Bogdanov and his supporters; Bogdanov believed that a socialist-oriented culture had to be developed among Russia's proletariat for them to become a successful revolutionary vehicle, whereas Lenin favoured a vanguard of socialist intelligentsia who could lead the working-classes in revolution. Furthermore, Bogdanov – influenced by Ernest Mach – believed that all concepts of the world were relative, whereas Lenin stuck to the orthodox Marxist view that there was an objective reality to the world, independent of human observation. Although Bogdanov and Lenin went on a holiday together to Gorky's villa in Capri, Italy, in April 1908, on returning to Paris, Lenin encouraged a split within the Bolshevik faction between his and Bogdanov's followers, accusing the latter of deviating from Marxism.

He lived briefly in London in May 1908, where he used the British Museum library to write Materialism and Empirio-criticism, an attack on Bogdanov's relativist perspective, which he lambasted as a "bourgeois-reactionary falsehood". Increasing numbers of Bolsheviks, including close Lenin supporters Alexei Rykov and Lev Kamenev, were becoming angry with Lenin's factionalism. The Okhrana recognised Lenin's factionalist attitude and deemed it damaging to the RSDLP, thereby sending a spy, Roman Malinovsky, to become a vocal supporter and ally of Lenin within the party. It is possible that Lenin was aware of Malinowsky's allegiance, and used him to feed false information to the Okhrana, and many Bolsheviks had expressed their suspicions that he was a spy to Lenin. However, he informed Gorky many years later that "I never saw through that scoundrel Malinowsky."

In August 1910 Lenin attended the 8th Congress of the Second International in Copenhagen, where he represented the RSDLP on the International Bureau, before going to Stockholm, where he holidayed with his mother; the last time that he would see her alive. Lenin moved with his wife and sisters to Bombon in Seine-et-Marne, although 5 weeks later moved back to Paris, settling in the Rue Marie-Rose. In France, Lenin became friends with the French Bolshevik Inessa Armand; they remained close from 1910 through to 1912, and some biographers believe that they had an extra-marital affair, although this remains unproven. He also set up a RSDLP school at Longjumeau where he lectured Russian recruits on a variety of topics in May 1911. Meanwhile, at a Paris meeting in June 1911 the RSDLP Central Committee decided to draw the focus of operations from Paris and back to Russia; they ordered the closure of the Bolshevik Centre and its newspaper, Proletari. Seeking to rebuild his influence in the party, Lenin arranged for a party conference to be held in Prague in January 1912, aided by his supporter Sergo Ordzhonikidze. 16 of the 18 attendants were Bolsheviks, but they heavily criticised Lenin for his factionalism, and lost much personal authority.

Desiring to be closer to Russia as the emigrant community were becoming decreasingly influential, Lenin moved to Kraków in the Kingdom of Galicia and Lodomeria, a culturally Polish part of the Austro-Hungarian Empire. He liked the city, and used the library at Jagellonian University to conduct his ongoing research. From here, he was able to stay in close contact with the RSDLP operating in the Russian Empire, with members often visiting him, and he convinced the Bolshevik members of the Duma to split from their alliance with Menshevik members. In January 1913, Stalin – whom Lenin referred to as the "wonderful Georgian" – came to visit, with the pair discussing the future of non-Russian ethnic groups in the Empire. Due to the ailing health of both Lenin and his wife, they moved to the rural area of Biały Dunajec. Nadya required surgery on her goiter, with Lenin taking her to Bern, Switzerland, to have it undertaken by the expensive specialist Theodor Kocher.

== First World War: 1914–1917 ==
"The [First World] war is being waged for the division of colonies and the robbery of foreign territory; thieves have fallen out–and to refer to the defeats at a given moment of one of the thieves in order to identify the interests of all thieves with the interests of the nation or the fatherland is an unconscionable bourgeois lie."

— Lenin

Lenin was back in Galicia when the First World War broke out, an international situation that he had paid little attention to. The war pitted the Russian Empire against the Austro-Hungarian Empire, and due to his Russian citizenship, Lenin was deemed a spy by the Austro-Hungarian authorities. In August, they arrested him and imprisoned him in Nowy Targ, although they released him once his anti-tsarist credentials were explained. To escape the violence of the eastern front, Lenin and his wife moved to neutral Switzerland, settling in Bern, although in February 1916 they moved to Zurich, which was cheaper. Lenin was angry that the German Social-Democratic Party had supported the German war effort, thereby contravening the Stuttgart resolution of the Second International that all socialist parties would oppose the international conflict. As a result, Lenin saw the Second International as defunct. In particular, he denounced German Marxist Karl Kautsky for supporting the German Social-Democratic Party.

Lenin was heavily involved in the socialist response to the conflict, attending the leftist anti-war Zimmerwald Conference in September 1915, and a second Kiental conference in April 1916, although neither were well attended. Lenin urged socialists across the continent to convert the "imperialist war" into a continent-wide "civil war" with the proletariat against the bourgeoisie and aristocracy. To achieve this, he encouraged the fraternisation of troops on opposing sides of the conflict, revolutionary strikes, the development of new revolutionary socialist organisations, and the criticism of nationalism. He also lambasted the Russian army and praised German advances against Russia, believing that it would weaken the Tsarist authorities. He justified this by asserting that Tsarism was "1000 times worse than [German] Kaiserism", and that the Tsarist authority was so reactionary that its removal was necessary for the proletariat revolution to succeed.

Influenced by the events of the First World War, Lenin wrote the book Imperialism, the Highest Stage of Capitalism. He argued that imperialism was a product of monopoly capitalism, as capitalists sought to increase their profits by extending into new territories where wages were lower and raw materials cheaper. He also criticised Kautsky's view that the imperialist powers would unite to form a peaceful, "ultra-imperialism", denouncing this view as "ultra-nonsense". Instead, Lenin believed that competition and conflict would increase and that war between the imperialist powers would continue until they were overthrown by proletarian revolution and socialism was established. Initial attempts to publish the work were stalled, and it would not see publication until September 1917.

Using Bern public library, Lenin devoted much time to reading the works of Georg Wilhelm Friedrich Hegel, Ludwig Feuerbach, and Aristotle, all of whom had been key influences on Marx's thought. In doing so he came to reject his earlier interpretations of Marxism; whereas he had once believed that policies could be developed on the basis of predetermined scientific principles, he now believed that the only test of whether a practice was right or not was through practice. Although still perceiving himself as an orthodox Marxist, he began to divert from some of Marx's predictions regarding societal development; whereas Marx, as Robert Service maintains, had believed that a bourgeois-democratic revolution of the middle-classes had to take place before a socialist revolution of the proletariat, Lenin believed that in Russia, the proletariat could overthrow the Tsarist regime without the intermediate revolution. In Switzerland, Lenin revived the Bolshevik magazine Social-Democrat with Grigory Zinoviev in November 1914. Contact with the Bolsheviks in Russia was sparse due to the war, while the Okhrana had intensified their suppression of Bolsheviks in the Empire. In July 1916, Lenin's mother died, although he was unable to attend her funeral in St. Petersburg due to the war. Her death deeply affected him, and he became depressed, fearing that he would not live long enough to witness the socialist revolution to which he had devoted his life.

== The February Revolution and the July Days: 1917 ==
Map of Lenin's Train Journey to Russia

In February 1917, the February Revolution broke out in Petrograd as industrial workers went on strike over food shortages and deteriorating factory conditions. The unrest spread to other parts of Russia, and fearing that he would be violently overthrown, Tsar Nicholas II abdicated. The State Duma took over control of the country, establishing a Provisional Government. When Lenin learned of this from his base in Switzerland, he celebrated with other dissidents, and immediately sent advice to the Bolsheviks in Russia. He decided to return to Russia to take charge of the Bolsheviks there, but found that most passages into the country were blocked due to the ongoing First World War, which the Provisional Government had decided to continue with. He organised a plan with other dissidents to negotiate a passage for them through Germany, with whom Russia was then at war. Recognising that these dissidents could cause problems for their Russian enemies, the German government agreed to permit 32 Russian citizens to travel in a train carriage through their territory, among them Lenin and his wife. The group then traveled by sealed train from Zurich to Singen, and then via Frankfurt and Berlin to Sassnitz, followed by a ferry to Trelleborg in Sweden. They took a train to Malmö, where they were welcomed by the mayor, and then on to Haparanda on the Swedish-Finnish border. From there, they went by sleigh to Tornio in Russian-controlled Finland, and then by train to Helsinki, before taking the final train to Petrograd.

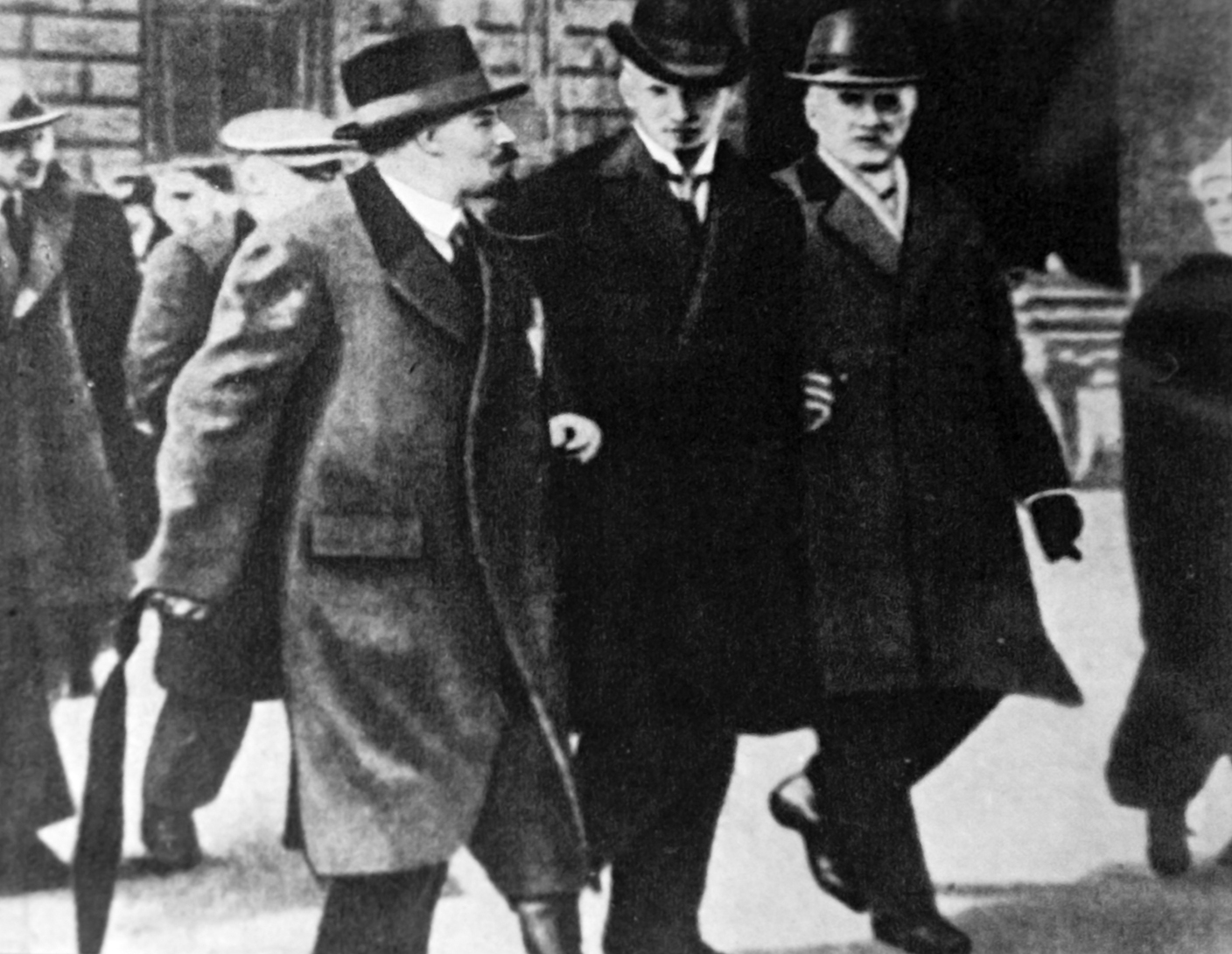
Lenin with Swedish socialists Ture Nerman and Carl Lindhagen in Stockholm, March 1917. Photo by Axel Malmström.

On arriving at Petrograd's Finland Station, Lenin was greeted by a crowd of Bolsheviks. There, he gave a speech condemning the Provisional Government, whom he believed to be bourgeoise and too similar to the former Tsarist administration, and again called for a Europe-wide proletariat revolution. Staying with his sister in the city, Anna Ilinichna, the following day he visited the graves of his deceased mother and sister Olga at Volkovo Cemetery. Over the following days he spoke at Bolshevik meetings; at a meeting in the Tauride Palace he lambasted those who wanted reconciliation with the Mensheviks and revealed his April Theses, an outline of his plans for the Bolsheviks which he had written on the journey from Switzerland. He also attended meetings of Marxists from different political factions, there arguing with the Mensheviks over various policies, particularly their support for the Provisional Government. In turn, they accused him of trying to plunge Russia into civil war. The Mensheviks and Social Revolutionaries who dominated the Petrograd Soviet believed that Russia was insufficiently developed to transition to socialism, and thus supported the Provisional Government; Lenin disagreed, deeming them traitors to the socialist cause. Considering the government to be as equally imperialist as the Tsarist regime, he advocated immediate peace with Germany, rule by soviets, the nationalisation of industry and banks, and the state expropriation of land, all with the intention of pushing toward a socialist society. Over the coming months he campaigned for these policies, attending the meetings of the Bolshevik Central Committee, prolifically writing for Pravda, and giving public speeches in Petrograd aimed at converting workers, soldiers, sailors, and peasants to his cause.

Sensing that there was growing frustration among Bolshevik supporters, who were agitating for armed insurrection, Lenin suggested an armed political demonstration in Petrograd to test the government's response. However, Lenin's health had deteriorated as he experienced headaches and insomnia and possibly began to experience the miniature heart attacks which would later afflict him. Nadezhda helped care for him, but was in poor health herself. He left Petrograd for the Finnish village of Neivola, where he visited his friend Vladimir Bonch-Bruevich to recuperate. The Bolsheviks' armed demonstration – the July Days – took place while Lenin was away, but upon learning that it had turned violent and clashed with government forces he returned to Petrograd. He met with the Bolshevik Central Committee at Kseshinskaya Mansion, and from the mansion's balcony called for calm to the assembled supporting crowds. Responding to the violence, the government accused Lenin of high treason and ordered his arrest alongside that of other prominent Bolsheviks, ultimately making 400 arrests and raiding both the mansion and the offices of Pravda. They also made public their knowledge that Lenin had been permitted passage through Germany and thus press claimed him to be a German agent provocateur. While many others were arrested, Lenin escaped and hid in a series of Petrograd safe houses.

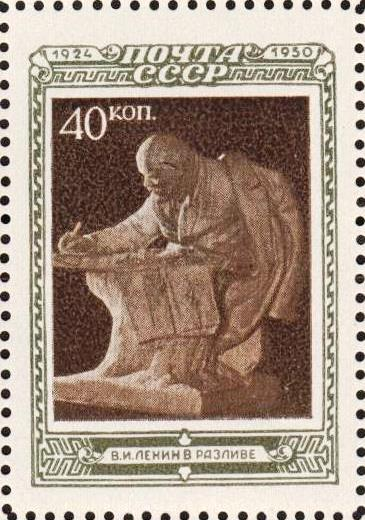
"Lenin in Razliv," depicted on a 1950 postage stamp

Fearing that he would be killed, Lenin and fellow senior Bolshevik Grigory Zinoviev then escaped Petrograd in disguise, relocating to a house in Razliv owned by Bolshevik metalworker Nikolai Yemelyanov. Concerned about being discovered, they soon left the house for a rural thatchet hut, where they were plagued by mosquitos and torrential rain. It was here that Lenin began work on the book that became The State and Revolution, an exposition on how he believed the socialist state would develop following the proletarian revolution, and how from that point on the state would gradually wither away leaving a pure communist society. The book also represented an attack on other Marxist and far left groups which did not share his embrace of violence as the primary means of achieving proletarian revolution, an attitude that he blamed on the influence of Kautsky. At this point he also dramatic altered his approach to the soviets, declaring them to be counter-revolutionary for their support of the Provisional Government, which he now lambasted as a "military dictatorship". He began arguing for a Bolshevik-led armed insurrection to topple the government, although at a clandestine meeting of the party's central committee this idea was rejected. Lenin then headed by train and by foot to Finland, arriving at Helsinki on 10 August, where he hid away in safe houses belonging to Bolshevik sympathisers. Due to this geographical isolation, Lenin was unable to attend the party's sixth congress, held in secret during July and August.

== The October Revolution: 1917 ==
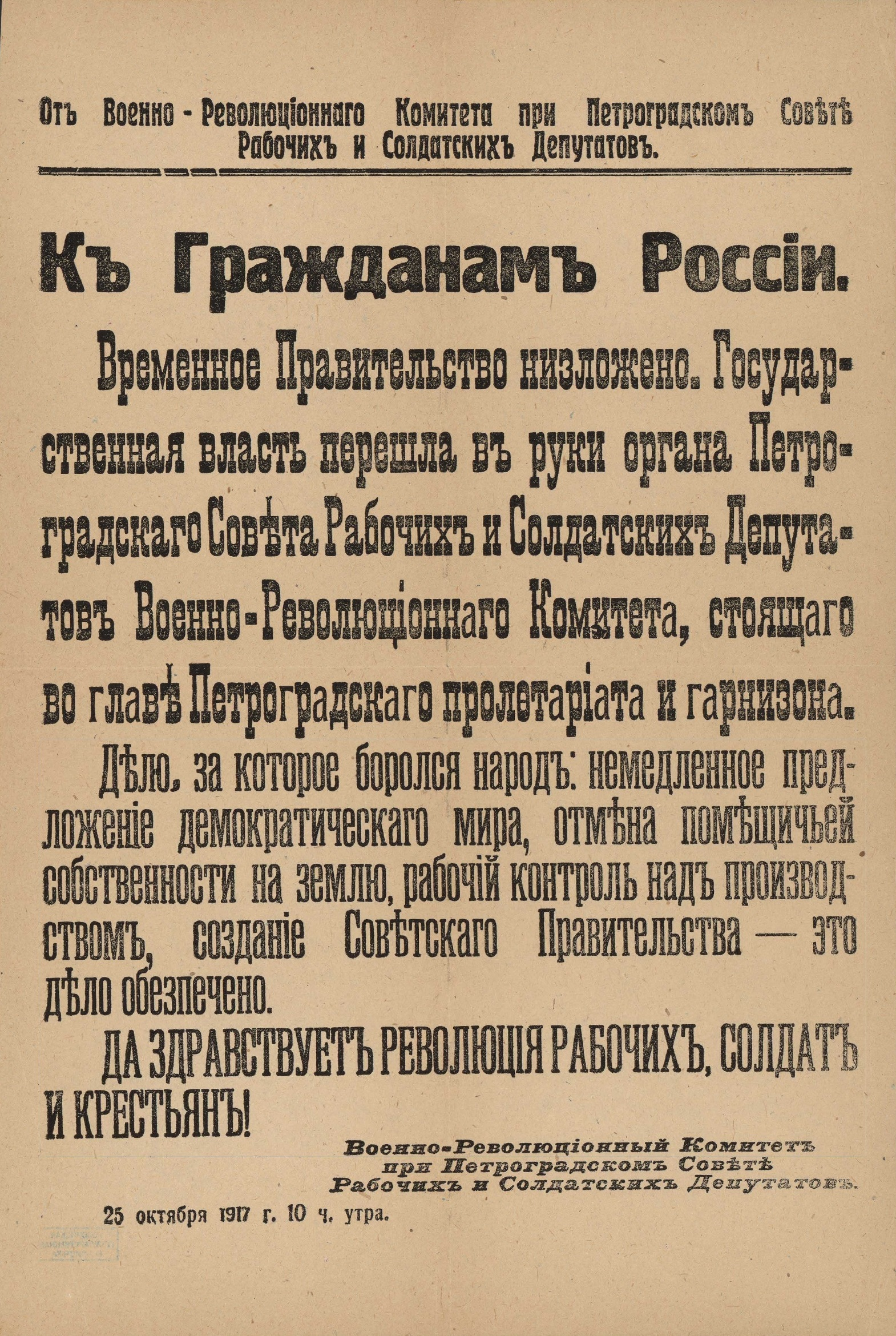
Facsimile of the Petrograd Military Revolutionary Committee proclamation of the disbanding of the Russian Provisional Government

In late August 1917, while Lenin was in hiding in Finland, General Lavr Kornilov, the Commander-in-Chief of the Russian Army, sent troops from the Eastern front to Petrograd in what appeared to be a military coup attempt against the Provisional Government. Premier Alexander Kerensky panicked and turned to the Petrograd Soviet – including its Bolshevik members – for help, allowing the revolutionaries to organise workers as Red Guards to defend Petrograd. The coup petered out before it reached Petrograd thanks to the industrial action of the Petrograd workers and the soldiers' increasing unwillingness to obey their officers, however the events' primary beneficiaries had been the Bolsheviks, whose return to the open political arena it permitted. Fearing a counter-revolution from right-wing forces hostile to socialism, the Mensheviks and Social-Revolutionaries who then dominated the Petrograd Soviet had been instrumental in pressurising the government to normalise relations with the Bolsheviks. However, both the Mensheviks and Social-Revolutionaries had lost much popular support because of their affiliation with the Provisional Government and its unpopular continuation of the war, with the Bolsheviks capitalising on this, and soon the pro-Bolshevik Marxist Trotsky was elected leader of the Petrograd Soviet. In September, the Bolsheviks gained a majority in the workers' sections of both the Moscow and Petrograd Soviets.

Recognising that the situation was safer for him, Lenin returned to Petrograd via Vyborg. There, Lenin attended a meeting of the Bolshevik Central Committee on 10 October, where he again argued his case that the party should lead an armed insurrection of their supporters to topple the Provisional Government. This time, he was successful in his argument, and the motion was ratified with ten votes against two. Those critical of the plan, Zinoviev and Kamenev, expressed the view that Russian workers would not support a violent coup against the existing regime and that there was no clear evidence for Lenin's assertion that all of Europe was on the verge of proletarian revolution. The party began plans to organise the offensive, holding a final meeting at the Smolny Institute on 24 October. This was the base of the Military Revolutionary Committee (MRC), an armed militia that had been established by the Petrograd Soviet with the Provisional Government's support during the Kornilov Affair; the MRC consisted largely of those loyal to the Bolsheviks.

In October, the MRC were given the order to seize control of Petrograd's key transport, communication, printing and utilities hubs, doing so without bloodshed. While the insurrection was taking place, Lenin gave a speech to the Petrograd Soviet announcing that the Provisional Government had been overthrown. However, at this point the government had yet to surrender, instead being under siege from armed Bolsheviks within the Winter Palace; when a Bolshevik ship, the Aurora, sailed along the palace and opened fire on it the government eventually surrendered, with the ministers being imprisoned. The Bolsheviks declared the formation of a new government, the Council of People's Commissars or "Sovnarkom"; although Lenin had initially turned down the leading position of Chairman, suggesting Trotsky for the job, the other Bolsheviks refused to accept this and ultimately Lenin relented. Lenin and other Bolsheviks then attended the Second Congress of Soviets, held over 26 and 27 October and dominated by Bolshevik-controlled urban soviets rather than their rural counterparts. There they announced the creation of the new government, but were condemned by Menshevik attendees, who lambasted the Bolshevik coup as illegitimate and warned that it could lead to civil war. In these early days of the new regime, Lenin avoided talking in explicitly Marxist and socialist phraseology, fearing that in doing so he might alienate much of Russia's population, and instead he focused on talking about the establishment of a new form of government in which the country was controlled by the workers. At this point, Lenin and many other Bolsheviks were expecting proletarian revolution to sweep across Europe, either in the coming days or, at most, in the coming months.
