= The Development of Capitalism in Russia =

Book by Vladimir Lenin

- Author: Vladimir Lenin (as Vladimir Ilyin)
- Original title: Развитие капитализма в России
- Language: Russian
- Genre: Economic history
- Published: 1899
- Publication place: Russian Empire
- Pages: 479 (First edition)

The Development of Capitalism in Russia (Russian: Развитие капитализма в России, romanized: Razvitie kapitalizma v Rossii) was an early economic work by Vladimir Lenin, intitiated shortly after his jailing for revolutionary activity in 1895 and completed during Siberian exile. It was legally published in St. Petersburg in 1899 under the pseudonym "Vladimir Ilyin."

The book was written against Narodnik intellectuals Vasily Vorontsov, Nikolai Danielson, and N.K. Mikhailovsky, who contended that peasant Russia could pass to socialism without first passing through the stage of capitalism. It argues instead that capitalism had already irreversibly established itself in the Russian countryside and that its development would continue inexorably.

Richly sourced and academic in tone, the thick volume helped establish his Lenin's place as a major Marxist theorist. The book has subsequently been criticized by scholars for exaggeration of the place and pace of capitalist development in peasant Russia at the dawn of the 20th century, although it remains a fundamental work for understanding the thinking behind Lenin's revolutionary strategy.

The book has sold multiple millions of copies in no fewer than 29 languages since its original publication.

== History ==
Vladimir Ulianov (Lenin) began the research which ended in publication of his book The Development of Capitalism in Russia while jailed in St. Petersburg after his arrest in connection with the case of the "League of Struggle for the Emancipation of the Working Class." According to the testimony of his wife, Nadia Krupskaya, Lenin placed his book requests in his legal letters. His sister, Anna Ulyanova-Elizarova, also a committed revolutionary, then made her brother's work possible, ferrying "heaps of books from the Free Economic Society library, from the Academy of Sciences, and from other scientific book repositories," as she later recalled in her memoirs.

Lenin joked when he was released from prison for deportation that he was "sorry they have let me out so soon," since "I haven't quite finished the book and it will be difficult to get books in Siberia."

Sentenced to a term of administrative exile, Lenin continued to work on this book on his way to his final destination at the village of Shushenskoye, located near the small town of Minusinsk in southern Siberia, managing to make hasty use of private and public libraries at Krasnoyarsk en route. Hearrived in Shushenskoye in May 1897, joined by his wife and her mother where he was to serve out a three year sentence. While in Shushenskoye, he continued to make use of family members to check out and send various books on his behalf. His younger sister, Maria Ulyanova, also a committed Social Democratic revolutionary, aided his research by compiling handwritten extracts from otherwise unobtainable sources in the Rumiantsev Museum Library in Moscow.

Over the course of the three years spent in research and writing, Lenin thereby managed to examine and harvest information from more than 600 sources, cited in the author's footnotes, including various monographs, articles, and reference works. The draft of The Development of Capitalism in Russia was completed in October 1898 and the production of a clean manuscript for the printer began immediately. The final editing process continued for several months, with the final text finally locked down and sent for publication in January 1899.

The first edition of the book, legally published under pseudonym "Vladimir Ilyin," saw print at the end of March 1899 in a press run of 2400 copies. Although receiving little notice in the press, the book nevertheless sold out quickly to students and other members of the Russian intelligentsia.

In 1908, the second edition of the book was published with minor changes. This revised edition became the basic text of the book, which was massively reprinted in the years following the October Revolution of 1917. One Soviet estimate from 1957, counting copies produced both under separate covers as well as part of the various editions of Lenin's works, indicated that at least 29 languages had appeared, with a total print run of 3,372,000 copies.

== Content ==
The Development of Capitalism in Russia: The Process of Formation of a Home Market for Large-Scale Industry is a weighty book in both the figurative and literal sense, weighing in at 479 pages plus supplemental tables in its Russian first edition, expanding to 489 pages in its second edition of 1908. The book comprises by itself a complete thick volume in the various editions of Lenin's collected works.

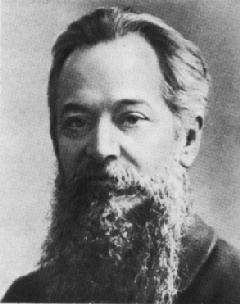
Both Vasily Vorontsov (1847–1918) and Nikolai Danielson (above, 1844–1918) were more than two decades older than Lenin, adding a generational component to his critique.

The book was an answer to Narodnik (Populist) economists Vasily Vorontsov ("V.V.") and Nikolai Danielson ("Nikolai-on"), who had argued that Russian capitalism had little popular support nor an significant internal market among the country's impoverished rural population. Also catching flak was N.K. Mikhailovsky another leading Narodnik publicist.

Vorontsov and Danielson advanced an "underconsumptionist" argument, declaring that capitalism could only maintain itself if manufacturers were able to sell their industrial output to a mass market — a situation impossible in Russia due to its primitive agricultural basis with the peasantry drained of whatever surpluses it could generate through taxation. These and other Narodnik thinkers argued that the continued existence of the peasant commune in the villages, overseeing land use and administering collective tax burdens, provided a basis for an advancement of Russia from its current pre-capitalist state to socialism without passing through the capitalist stage of development.

Lenin argued that, to the contrary, the rural communes had already been wiped out by capitalism and statistics showed the degree to which feudalism was already dying in Russia. Lenin noted the growth of a national market for goods in Russia replacing local markets, the tendency to grow cash crops rather than rely on subsistence agriculture, and a growth of individual rather than communal property ownership.

Lenin also emphasized the growth of class division within the peasantry, with a widening split between a landholding and labor-employing rural bourgeoise versus mostly landless rural agricultural workers, the byproduct of a dwindling middle peasantry. Lenin saw a common set of interests between rural and urban proletariat and the possibility of a worker–peasant alliance against the representatives of capital.

The Development of Capitalism in Russia posited a process of steady, unilinear, irreversible social change, part and parcel of a process of ever-increasing agricultural production through the advancement of farm technology and the consolidation of landholding.

"Big was not only beautiful, it was also cost-effective," summarizes British historian Robert Service, with rich peasants steadily expanding their land holdings by buying out their poorer neighbors, who would subsequently be employed as agricultural laborers. This propertyless rural population was pegged at 10.5 million out of a rural population 125 million by Lenin, with an additional broad swath of "semi-proletarian" poor peasants, virtually indistinguishable from their landless cousins, swelling the total rural working poor to a total of 63 million.

== Commentary ==
Historian and Lenin biographer Robert Service echos an observation made by others the The Development of Capitalism in Russia was an academic work which served to confirm Lenin's place as a "socialist scholar-politician."

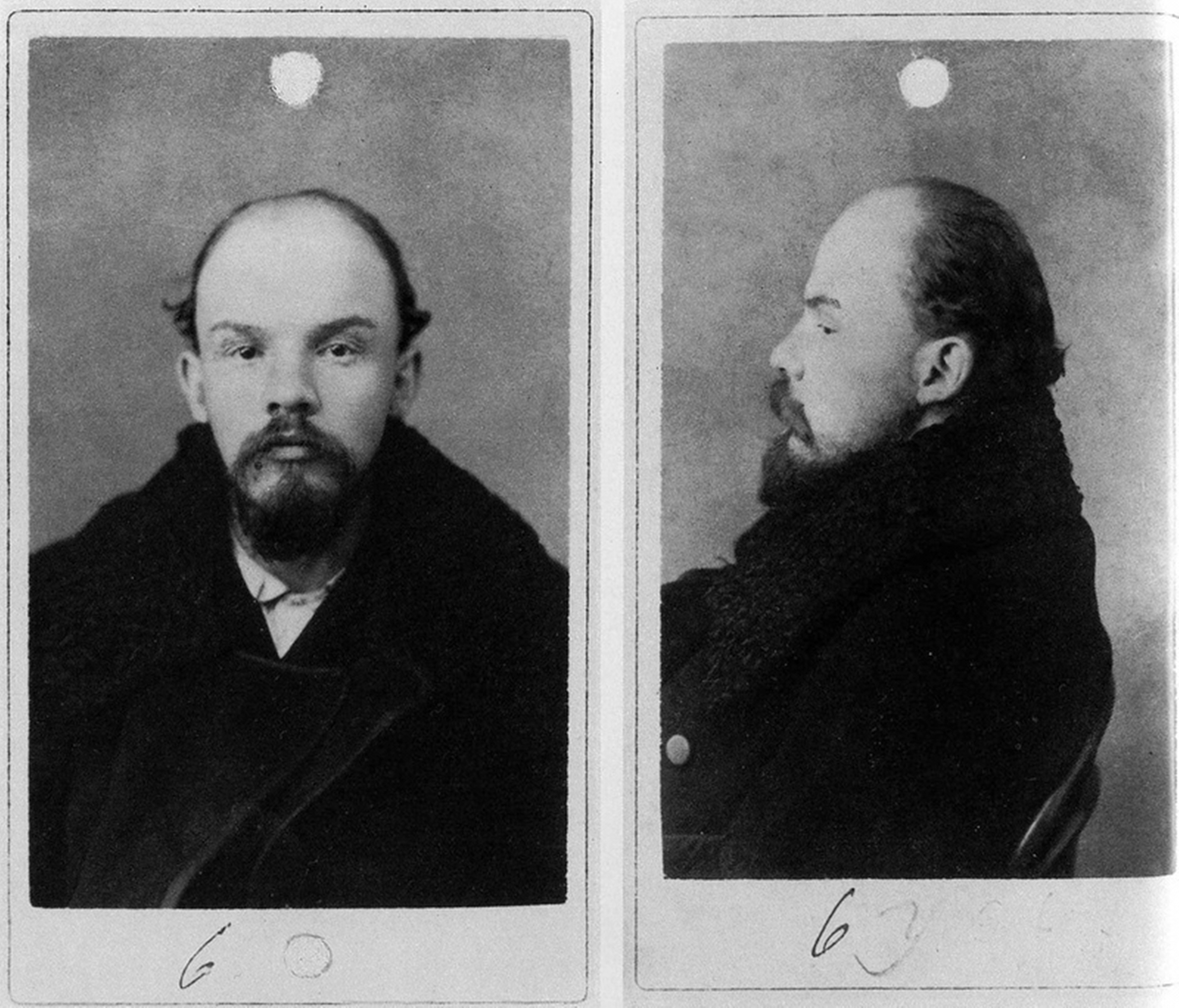
Police mugshot of Lenin from 1895, shortly before he began work on The Development of Capitalism in Russia.

"It was published legally under the pseudonym of V. Ilyin. Each chapter contains lengthy sections written in a style characteristic of academic treatises; but his many derogatory remarks about Mikhailovsky and Vorontsov testified to lively political aims. He was launching an offensive on a limited front. Subsequent generations would often regard [the work] as a comprehensive textbook on the country's economic transformation in modern times. But in fact [Lenin] stated narrower intentions: he wished to examine the formation of the Russian domestic market for capitalism."

Lenin hoped to spark a literary furore with the book's sarcastic asides, Service believes, but its actual reception in 1899 was in actual fact "rather quiet" with "no reviewer properly enthused about the work."

Calling it "a work of great weaknesses and great strengths," Service states that "few writers in the field of general economic developmental theory would nowadays be so inattentive either to state intervention...or to foreign loans." Nor, he adds, "is it proven that agricultural efficiency always rises proportionally to the size of landholding."

Economic historian Alec Nove characterized The Development of Capitalism in Russia as "the most considerable work of Lenin the economist in length, depth, and scope." Nove indicated that Lenin's book "had an avowed object, that of proving that the narodiks (populists) were wrong, because the traditional Russia of subsistence economy peasants and handicrafts workers had already been permeated with commercial and capitalist relations, and that the tendency towards the break-up of patriarchal and village community institutions had gone far and was now irreversible."

Nove noted that Lenin's arguing that the gravity of economic forces pulling the ancient peasant mir onto the capitalist road of development put him "in line with other Russian Marxists, including the future Mensheviks," although Lenin went further than his contemporaries by arguing that capitalism was already essentially established, still years before the implementation of the Stolypin reform.

Writing in 1967, Nove asserted:

"Recent research has tended to show that Lenin overestimated the extent and speed of the capitalist transformation of Russian agriculture.... [T]he Russian peasantry was to demonstrate its attachment to the traditional communal forms even in the first ten years of Bolshevik rule. It is not that Lenin's statistics were 'wrong.' The point is simply that he had to adapt and arrange fragmentary data, and it would have been possible for an able opponent to adapt and arrange other fragmentary data to modify somewhat the picture of the 1890s. However, Lenin was surely right in his assessment of trends. Either Russia was already on capitalist rails, or the combined efforts of Witte and Stolypin were going to put it there..."

In the view of British intellectual historian Neil Harding, Lenin's analysis of the dynamics of rural development was one of the principal strains of his thought with regards to building a revolutionary movement in backwards, peasant Russia:

"What Lenin sought to demonstrate, in his theoretical analysis of Russian society, was that the peasantry was being more and more split up into a rural proletariat of landless labourers obliged to sell their labour-power, and a rural bourgeoisie at different stages of consolidating its capital. The rural proletariat was, in his political strategy, a crucially important group. Unless the urban industrial workers managed to secure its support, the prospects for the democratic revolution would be bleak indeed. Since, however, they shared the same objective interests as wage labourers, and sinc ehty had common grievances agains capitalist exploitation, there was every prospect that a working alliance could be formed."

Thus, Harding intimates, The Development of Capitalism in Russia had lasting importance as part of Lenin and the Bolshevik Party's strategic understanding of the revolutionary process on the rural margins of world capitalism.

== See also ==
- Vladimir Lenin bibliography
