= Nikolai Ziber =

Russian economist and professor

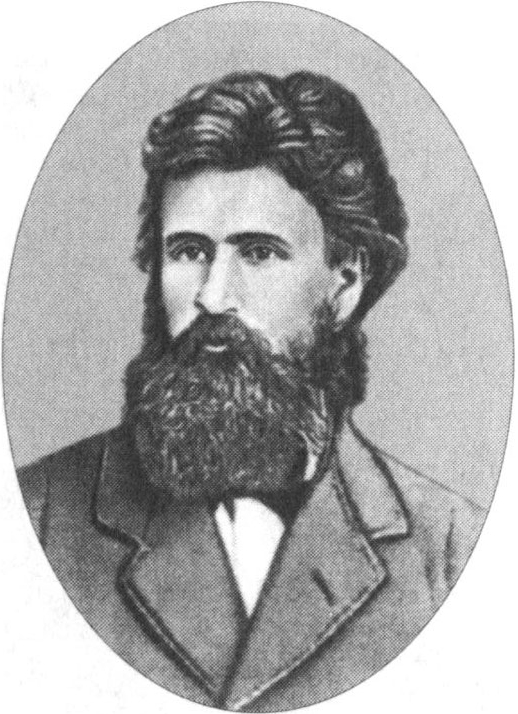
N.I. Ziber.

Nikolai Ivanovich Ziber (Russian: Никола́й Ива́нович Зи́бер, Ukrainian: Микола Іванович Зібер; 22 March [O.S. 10 March] 1844 – 10 May [O.S. 28 April] 1888) was a Ukrainian academic economist, professor and one of the first advocates of Marxism in Russian Empire, particularly in Kyiv. His interpretation of Marxism differed sharply from that of early narodnik economists like V. P. Vorontsov and N. F. Danielson and laid the groundwork for the 'orthodox' Marxism of G. V. Plekhanov, V. I. Lenin and others.

== Life ==
N. I. Ziber was born on March 10 (22), 1844, in Sudak, in the Feodosiysky Uyezd of the Taurida Governorate of the Russian Empire. His father was a Swiss immigrant and his mother was of French origin. He obtained a law degree in 1866 from the University of Kiev, and a degree in economics in 1871. In 1873 he became a professor at the Department of Political Economy and Statistics at the University of Kiev. In 1875, he resigned his position and went to Switzerland following dismissal of Mykhailo Drahomanov from the Kiev University and, subsequently, to London, England. In Switzerland he was an editor of the Drahomanov's magazine "Hromada", while in London in 1881 he became personally acquainted with Karl Marx and Friedrich Engels. Ziber had written his dissertation of Marx and David Ricardo, and in 1885, he published an expanded version of his thesis, David Ricardo and Karl Marx: Their Socioeconomic Research. In the 1870s, Ziber also contributed to such journals as Zanie and Slovo, expounding Marx' Capital (Vol. 1). A notable series of articles was entitled 'Marx' Economic Theory.'

Ziber defended Marx against critics like I.G. Zhukjovsky and B.N. Chicherin and was one of the first to criticise narodnik economists like V. P. Vorontsov and N. F. Danielson along 'orthodox' Marxist lines later developed by G.V. Plekhanov, P.B. Struve, V.I. Lenin, D. Blagoev, and N. E. Fedoseev, among others. While Vorontsov argued that the development of industrial capitalism was impossible in Russia due to a lack of markets, and Danielson thought that, owing to Russia's belated development, capitalism was not necessary for industrial development, Ziber interpreted Marxism to entail that capitalism was an inevitable stage of development in the history of any society. (In this interpretation he was influenced by Marx' own Preface to the German edition of Capital, where Marx rebuts German writers who argued that Marx' analysis of British capitalism did not apply to Germany.) Since the development of capitalism was, according to Ziber, in its infancy in Russia in the 1870s and '80s, Russia's foreseeable future would consist of a lengthy period of capitalist modernisation. Although Ziber had contacts with progressive and oppositional circles, he thought socialism was a distant prospect for Russia, and seems to have had no contact with illegal revolutionary movements. His deterministic interpretation of Marxism entered the revolutionary movement through Plekhanov, Struve and the young Lenin. However, unlike Ziber, these revolutionary Marxists thought that, by the 1890s at least, capitalist industrialisation was far enough advanced to make a socialist revolution possible within the foreseeable future. (Nonetheless, in the 1880s and '90s, they all insisted that Russia's coming revolution would be 'bourgeois-democratic'.)

== Works ==
- Izbrannye ekonomicheskie proizyedeniia. vols. 1–2. Moscow, 1959.
