= Sklyarenko =

Sklyarenko (Ukrainian: Скляренко) is a Ukrainian-language family name.

The surname may refer to:

- Alexei Sklyarenko (1870–1916), Russian revolutionary
- Andrey Sklyarenko (born 1976), retired Kazakhstani hurdler
- Oksana Sklyarenko (born 1981), Ukrainian marathon runner
