= All-Russian Congress of Soviets of Workers' and Soldiers' Deputies =

All-Russian Congress of Soviets of Workers' and Soldiers' Deputies may refer to:

- All-Russian Central Executive Committee of the Soviets of Workers' and Soldiers' Deputies
- First All-Russian Congress of Soviets of Workers' and Soldiers' Deputies
- Second All-Russian Congress of Soviets of Workers' and Soldiers' Deputies
- Third All-Russian Congress of Workers', Soldiers' and Peasants Deputies' Soviets
