= Alexei Sklyarenko =

Russian revolutionary (1870–1916)

Alexei Pavlovich Skliarenko (Russian: Алексе́й Па́влович Скляре́нко; real name Alexei Vasilyevich Popov; 1870 – July 1916) was a participant in Russia's revolutionary movement.

== Background ==
Alexei P. Skliarenko was born by 1870, in Verniy which became Alma-Ata. He was the son of a physician.

By the time he was 18 years old, his life took a revolutionary turn. In 1886, Skliarenko joined the Narodnik movement. In 1887, he was arrested and imprisoned in Kresty, a prison in St. Petersburg. By September 1889, Skliarenko met Vladimir I. Lenin and the then Vladimir I Ulyanov joined Skliarenko's discussion group. Together, these two men's thinking developed towards the validity of Marxism. In 1893, Skliarenko joined a group of Marxists. In 1894, he was again arrested and this time he was exiled to Arkhangelsk province.

By 1898, Alexei P. Skliarenko had joined the Russian Social Democratic Labor Party or RSDLP. In 1898-1903, he did field work for the party first in Tula and then in Harbin. By 1903, his work for the party took him to St. Petersburg. From 1905 to 1907, Skliarenko served on the Bureau of the RSDLP where he represented the Central Region of Saratov and where he also worked on the Samara committee of the RSDLP. In 1907, Skliarenko was both one of the 338 delegates to the 5th Congress of the Russian Social Democratic Labour Party and was also once again arrested and on this occasion he was exiled to Syktyvkar. In 1911, Skliarenko returned to St. Petersburg where he adopted the pen-name Bosoi and where he would write items for the Bolshevik newspapers Zvezka and Pravda as well as the journal Prosveshchenie (Enlightenment).

In July 1916, Alexei P. Skliarenko died in Saint Petersburg, Russia, never living to see Russia's October Revolution.
