= Nikolai Danielson =

Russian economist and sociologist (1844–1918)

Nikolai F. Danielson
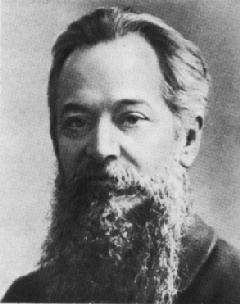
- Danielson
- Born: 7 February 1844; Moscow, Moskovsky Uyezd, Moscow Governorate, Russian Empire
- Died: 13 July 1918 (aged 74); Petrograd, Russian SFSR
- Other names: N-on, Nik-on, Nikolai-on
- Occupations: Economist and sociologist

Nikolai Frantsevich Danielson (Russian: Никола́й Фра́нцевич Дание́льсон; also known as N-on, Nik-on, Nikolai-on; 7 February 1844 – 13 July 1918) was a Russian socio-political figure, economist, publicist, and one of the theoreticians of narodism. He is also famous for his translations of Das Kapital by Marx, and being a writer on Russian economic development.

== Early life ==
Danielson was of Finnish descent. He graduated from Commercial School in St. Petersburg, and later attended lectures in St. Petersburg's university.

In the 1860s Danielson worked at the St Petersburg Mutual Credit Association. Mutual credit associations were then often associated with utopian and social reform politics, and during that period, he became involved in radical political circles and took interest in one of the populist narodnik movement.

== Economic Writings and Translation of Das Kapital ==
In 1872, Danielson published the first Russian translation of volume 1 of Das Kapital by Karl Marx. The translation had been initiated by Mikhail Bakunin before Bakunin's break with Marx and had been continued by German Lopatin. While completing the translation, Danielson initiated a correspondence with Karl Marx and Friedrich Engels, which continued for the rest of their lives. Danielson also translated volumes 2 and 3 of Das Kapital, which were published in 1885 and 1896. In 1880 Danielson published the article "Studies of Our Post-Reform Economy" in issue 10 of the journal Slovo. Marx, who had taught himself Russian, commended it and encouraged Danielson to expand it into a book, which Danielson subsequently did. That book, bearing the same title, appeared in 1893. The book and the article on which it was based contained extensive statistical material on Russia's economic development.

== Views on Marxism ==
Danielson regarded himself as a Marxist, but was criticized by the self-proclaimed "orthodox" Marxists Georgi Plekhanov, Vladimir Lenin and Peter Struve, among others. Danielson's critics grouped him with populist writers like Vasily Vorontsov and Nikolay Mikhaylovsky. But whereas Vorontsov claimed that the development of industrial capitalism in Russia was impossible for lack of markets and Mikhailovsky thought that it was possible but undesirable and preventable. Danielson argued that capitalist industrialisation was already well under way in Russia by the 1890s. The "orthodox" Marxists agreed with him in this. However, in the 1890s, Plekhanov, Lenin and their associates argued that capitalism in Russia must follow essentially the same course as capitalist development in Western Europe. Danielson believed that the "capitalist stage" of development could be foreshortened in Russia, since Russia's late development would allow it to adopt the latest western industrial technology without having to undergo the social evolution that had first produced it in the West. This theory went back to A.I. Herzen and N.G. Chernyshevsky and strongly influenced the theoreticians of the Socialist-Revolutionary Party (PSR), such as Victor Chernov. It also anticipated Leon Trotsky's theory of "uneven and combined development". Danielson argued that capitalism was essentially dispensable for further economic development, and that industrialisation could continue on the basis of a socialist economy. Like the narodniks, he saw the surviving peasant village communes as potential nuclei for a socialist organisation of the Russian economy. Plekhanov and Lenin denounced this as dangerous utopianism.

== Political Involvement ==
In the early 1900s, Danielson was briefly involved with the Russian Socialist-Revolutionary Party, but he did not play a very active role in it, and he withdrew after the "Azef affair" of 1908. (Yevno Azef was a prominent leader of the PSR and the chief of its terrorist organisation; in 1908 he was unmasked as a double agent for the Okhrana, the secret police.) Danielson seemed to have played no role in the Russian Revolution of 1917.
