= Vasily Vorontsov =

Russian academic (1847–1918)

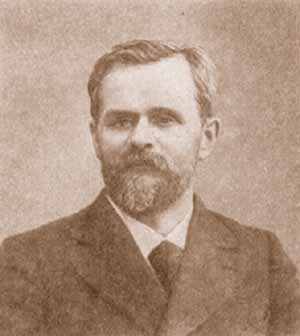

Vasilii Pavlovich Vorontsov (Russian: Василий Павлович Воронцов; Pseudonym: V.V., 13 January 1847 – 10 December 1918) was an influential Russian narodnik economist and sociologist, one of the principal protagonists in the controversy between narodnik and Marxist economists (like G. V. Plekhanov and P. B. Struve) in the 1880s and 1890s.

== Life ==
V. P. Vorontsov came from a distinguished aristocratic family. In the 1860s and 1870s he became involved in the populist (narodnik) movement. Although he had contacts with illegal narodnik circles, he was not himself involved in significant revolutionary activity. Instead, he was associated with the 'Legal Populists' who advocated political and economic reform from above. In particular, Vorontsov advocated measures to protect the repartitional peasant land commune which still survived in Russia.

Vorontsov was one of the first Russian economists to study the works of Karl Marx and was strongly influenced by Marx' historical materialism. However, unlike other early Russian students of Marx (e.g., N. I. Ziber, N. F. Danielson or G. V. Plekhanov), Vorontsov did not think the development of industrial capitalism was possible in Russia. His argument was that Russia did not have access to sufficient markets to fuel capitalist industrialisation: foreign markets were largely dominated by older, established capitalist powers, and Russia's domestic demand was too weak. As the 1890s wore on, Vorontsov had to admit that capitalism had made some inroads in Russia, but he attributed this to misguided government policies, such as protective tariffs on foreign manufactured goods, subsidies and low-interest loans to Russian industrialists and an ambitious infrastructure programme (e.g., railway building), together with agrarian policies designed to undermine communal land tenure. By contrast, Danielson thought that industrial capitalism had already taken root in Russia and that industrialisation was not necessarily bad, but that Russia, owing to its belated development, did not have to reproduce all the forms of capitalist relations of production under which industrialisation had occurred in the West, but could proceed to a more humane non-capitalist form of modernisation. Nevertheless, Vorontsov and Danielson are usually grouped together as major exponents of narodnik economics (much to Danielson's dismay).

The thesis that Russia did not have to undergo a period of capitalist development was sharply attacked by Russian Marxist economists. One of the earliest Russian Marxists, the economics professor N. I. Ziber, interpreted Marx to mean that a prolonged period of capitalism was a necessary 'historical stage' any society must undergo. While capitalism might already be in a state of crisis in Western Europe, in Russia, its development had just begun. The prospect for the foreseeable future -- which Ziber welcomed -- would therefore be a period of capitalist modernisation lasting several decades at least. Plekhanov, Struve and the young V.I. Lenin, who were associated with the revolutionary movement and with the founding of Russian Social-Democracy (RSDRP), looked for a quicker transition to socialism (although in the 1890s they insisted that Russia's coming revolution would be 'bourgeois-democratic'). Pace Vorontsov, they argued that the development of capitalism in Russia was not only inevitable but had already progressed sufficiently far to make its future breakdown visible on the horizon. They also disputed Vorontsov's argument that lack of markets made capitalism 'impossible' in Russia. The controversy between narodnik and Marxist economists in the 1880s and 1890s was crucial in the formulation of Russian "orthodox" Marxism, and hence in the ideology that subsequently influenced the ideologies of Menshevism and Bolshevism and its derivatives.

In January 1894, at an underground meeting in the City of St Petersburg, V. P. Vorontsov faced off against V. I. Lenin in a debate which attracted the attention of spies.

Vorontsov sympathised with the February Revolution of 1917 but opposed the October Revolution. Nevertheless, he remained in Russia. He died in 1918.

== Works ==
Sud’by kapitalizma v Rossii

Ocherki kustarnoi promyshlennosti v Rossii
- Sud’by kapitalizma v Rossii (Destinies of Capitalism in Russia) St. Petersburg, 1882.
- Ocherki kustarnoi promyshlennosti v Rossii St. Petersburg, 1886.
- “Krest’ianskaia obshchina.” In Itogi ekonomicheskikh issledovanii Rossii po dannym zemskoi statistiki, vol. 1. Moscow, 1892.
- Artel’nye nachinaniia russkogo obshchestva. St. Petersburg, 1895.
- Sud’ba kapitalisticheskoi Rossii. St. Petersburg, 1907.
- Ot semidesiatykh godov k deviatisotym. St. Petersburg, 1907.
